= Mercedes-Benz GLC =

Compact luxury crossover SUV

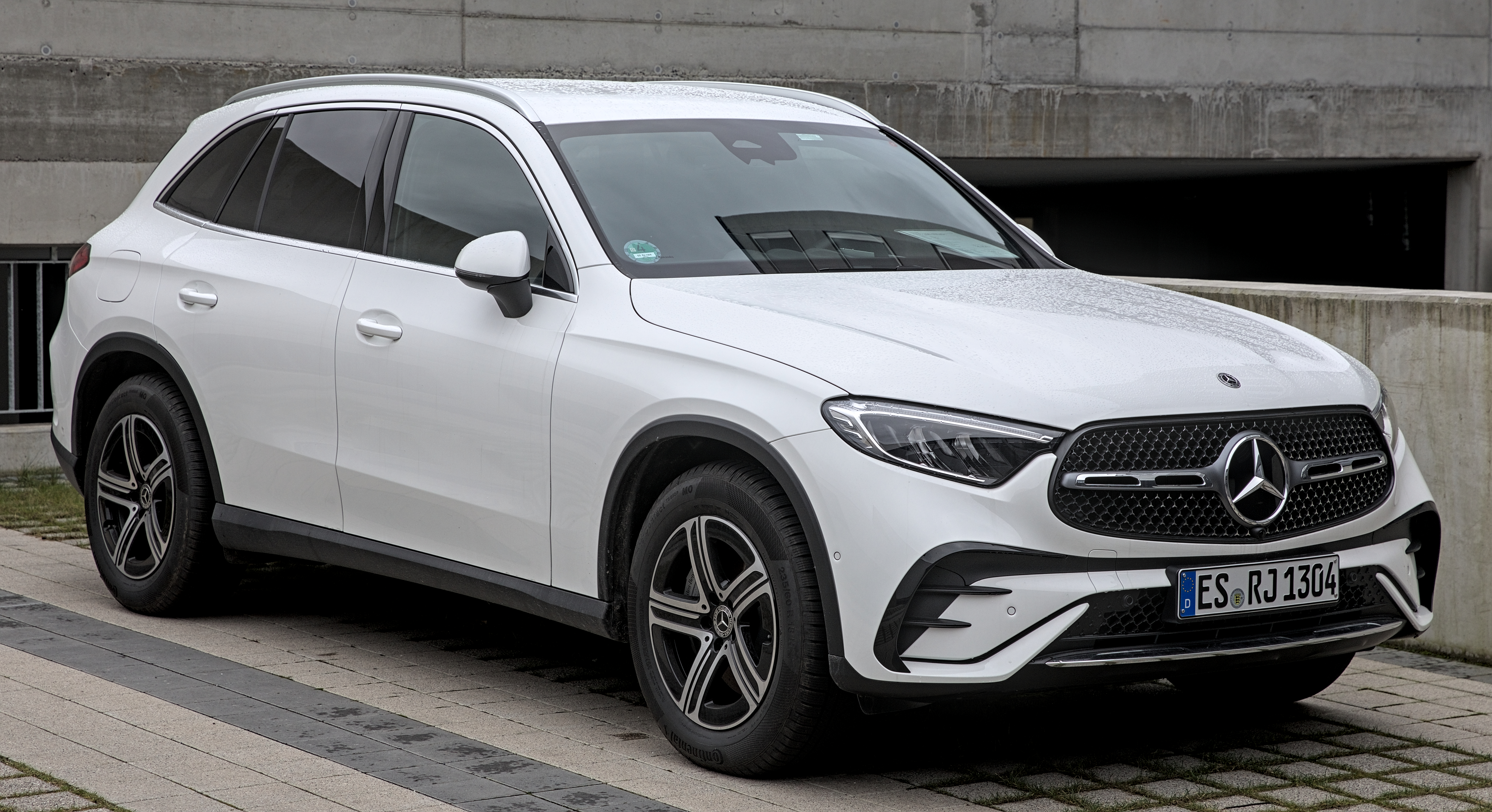
- 2022 Mercedes-Benz GLC 200 (X254)

Overview
- Manufacturer: Daimler AG (2015–2022); Mercedes-Benz Group (2022–present)
- Production: 2015–present
- Model years: 2016–present

Body and chassis
- Class: Compact luxury crossover SUV (D)
- Layout: Front-engine, rear-wheel-drive or four-wheel-drive (4Matic)

Chronology
- Predecessor: Mercedes-Benz GLK-Class

The Mercedes-Benz GLC is a compact luxury crossover SUV introduced in 2015 for the 2016 model year that replaced the GLK-Class. According to Mercedes-Benz, it is the SUV equivalent to the C-Class.

Under the vehicle naming scheme used by Mercedes-Benz, SUVs use the base name "GL", followed by the model's placement in Mercedes-Benz hierarchy. The "G" is for Geländewagen (German for off-road vehicle) and alludes to the long-running G-Class. This is followed by the letter "L" that acts as a linkage with the letter "C" to signify that the vehicle is a SUV equivalent to the C-Class.

The battery-electric model was first sold as the EQC, then as the GLC with EQ Technology and is sold now as the GLC Electric.

== First generation (X253/C253/V253; 2015) ==
First generation
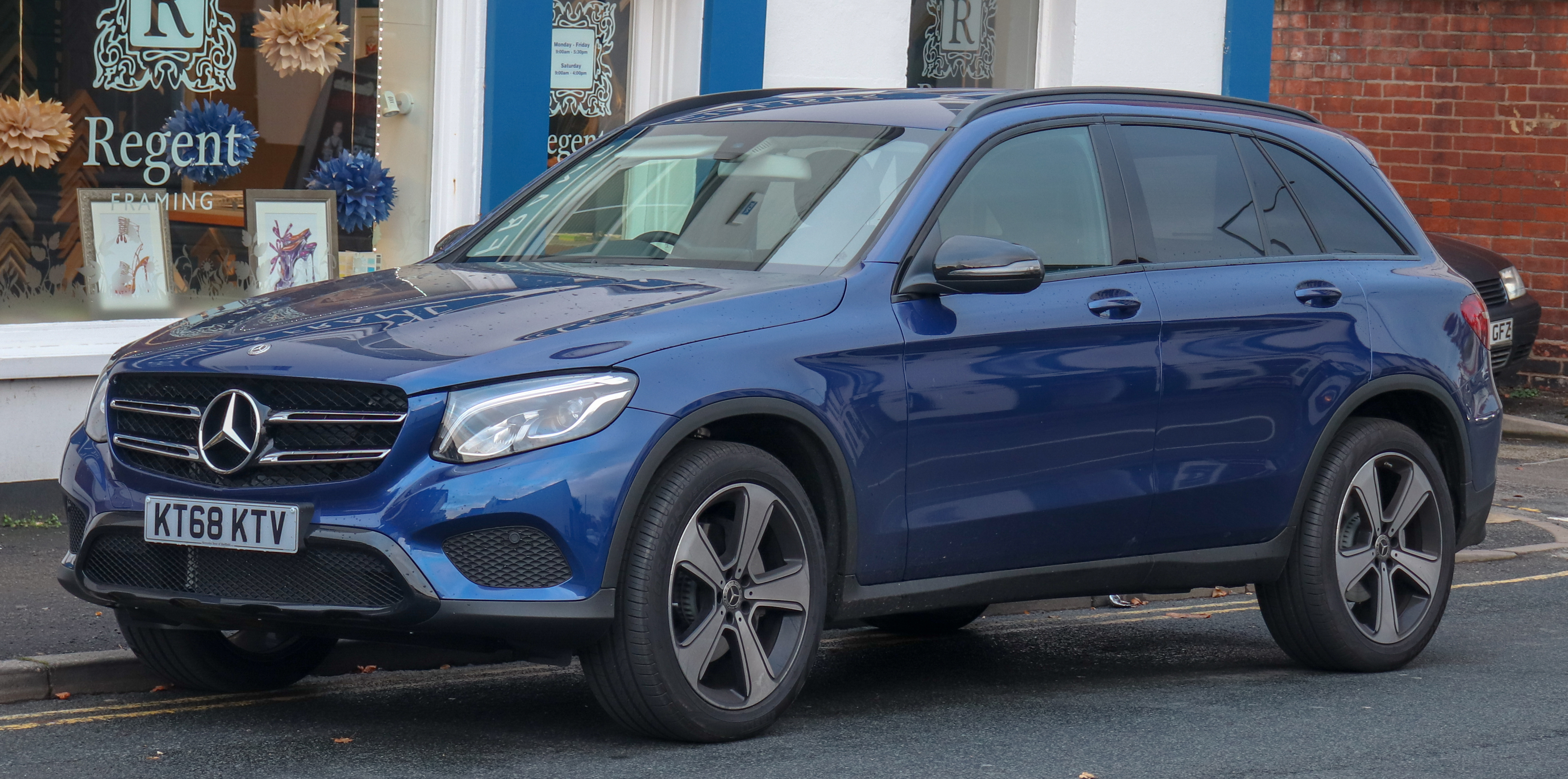

Overview
- Model code: X253; C253 (Coupé); V253 (long-wheelbase)
- Production: 2015–2022
- Model years: 2016–2022
- Assembly: Germany: Bremen; China: Beijing (Beijing Benz); India: Pune (Mercedes-Benz India); Finland: Uusikaupunki (Valmet); Indonesia: Bogor (MBI); Thailand: Samut Prakan (TAAP); Malaysia: Pekan (HICOM); Vietnam: Ho Chi Minh City (MBV)
- Designer: Michael Frei, Robert Lešnik

Body and chassis
- Body style: 5-door SUV; 5-door coupe SUV
- Platform: MRA
- Related: Mercedes-Benz EQC; Mercedes-Benz C-Class (W205)

Powertrain
- Engine: Petrol: 2.0 L M270/M274 I4 turbo; 3.0 L M276 DELA 30 V6 biturbo; 4.0 L M177 (Mercedes-AMG) V8 biturbo; Petrol hybrid: 2.0 L M264 E20 DEH LA I4 Mild-Hybrid Turbo (EQ Boost) (petrol); 2.0 L M274 I4 turbo (petrol PHEV); Diesel: 2.2 L OM651 I4 turbo; 2.0 L OM654 I4 turbo; 3.0 L OM642 V6 turbo
- Electric motor: 16 kW (21.5 hp) BorgWarner 48V eBooster Electric Starter-Generator Motor (EQ Boost); 65 kW (87.2 hp) Schaeffler PSM P2 Hybrid Module High Voltage (GLC 350e); 122 PS (120.3 hp; 89.7 kW) Schaeffler PSM P2 Hybrid Module High Voltage (GLC 300e); Electric motor powered by fuel cell and 13.5kWh battery (electric with Hydrogen Fuel Cell) (GLC F-CELL)
- Transmission: 9-speed 9G-Tronic automatic
- Hybrid drivetrain: Mild-Hybrid (EQ Boost); Gasoline-electric Plug-in hybrid (GLC 350e/GLC 300e); Diesel-electric Plug-in hybrid (GLC 300de)

Dimensions
- Wheelbase: 2,873 mm (113.1 in); 2,973 mm (117.1 in) (GLC L)
- Length: 4,656 mm (183.3 in); 4,765 mm (187.6 in) (GLC L)
- Width: 1,890 mm (74.4 in)
- Height: 1,638 mm (64.5 in); 1,603 mm (63.1 in) (Coupé)
- Curb weight: 1,790 kg (3,947 lb)

Like its predecessor, it is assembled at Mercedes-Benz's plant in Bremen, Germany. Since the main GLC production site in Bremen already runs at full capacity, Mercedes-Benz have decided to expand the production capacity by utilizing Valmet Automotive plant at Uusikaupunki, Finland. The manufacturing of the GLC started in Finland during Q1 of 2017.

The first-generation GLC was available in a five-door body style with seating for five. Mercedes also offers a GLC Coupé, with a sloping rear roof design. In mainland Europe, it is available with three diesel engines, three petrol engines, and a plug-in hybrid. In the United Kingdom, only three diesels and one petrol AMG-model are offered.

Power comes from a choice of 2.0-litre 4-cylinder turbocharged petrol (same engine combined with the electric engine in the 350e hybrid) and 2.2-litre 4-cylinder turbo diesel engines in various power stages mated to a 9-speed (7-speed for the 350e hybrid) G-Tronic automatic transmission. 4MATIC all-wheel-drive is standard in some markets and optional in others. The GLC has a track width of 63.9 in (1,623 mm) in front and 63.7 in (1,618 mm) in the rear. Trunk volume is rated at 20.5 cu ft (580 L).

In the German home market, the GLC 250 4MATIC petrol version is joined by GLC 220d 4MATIC and GLC 250d 4MATIC diesel versions along with a plug-in hybrid version called the 350e. In North America, only the GLC 300, GLC 43 AMG and GLC 63 AMG are available.

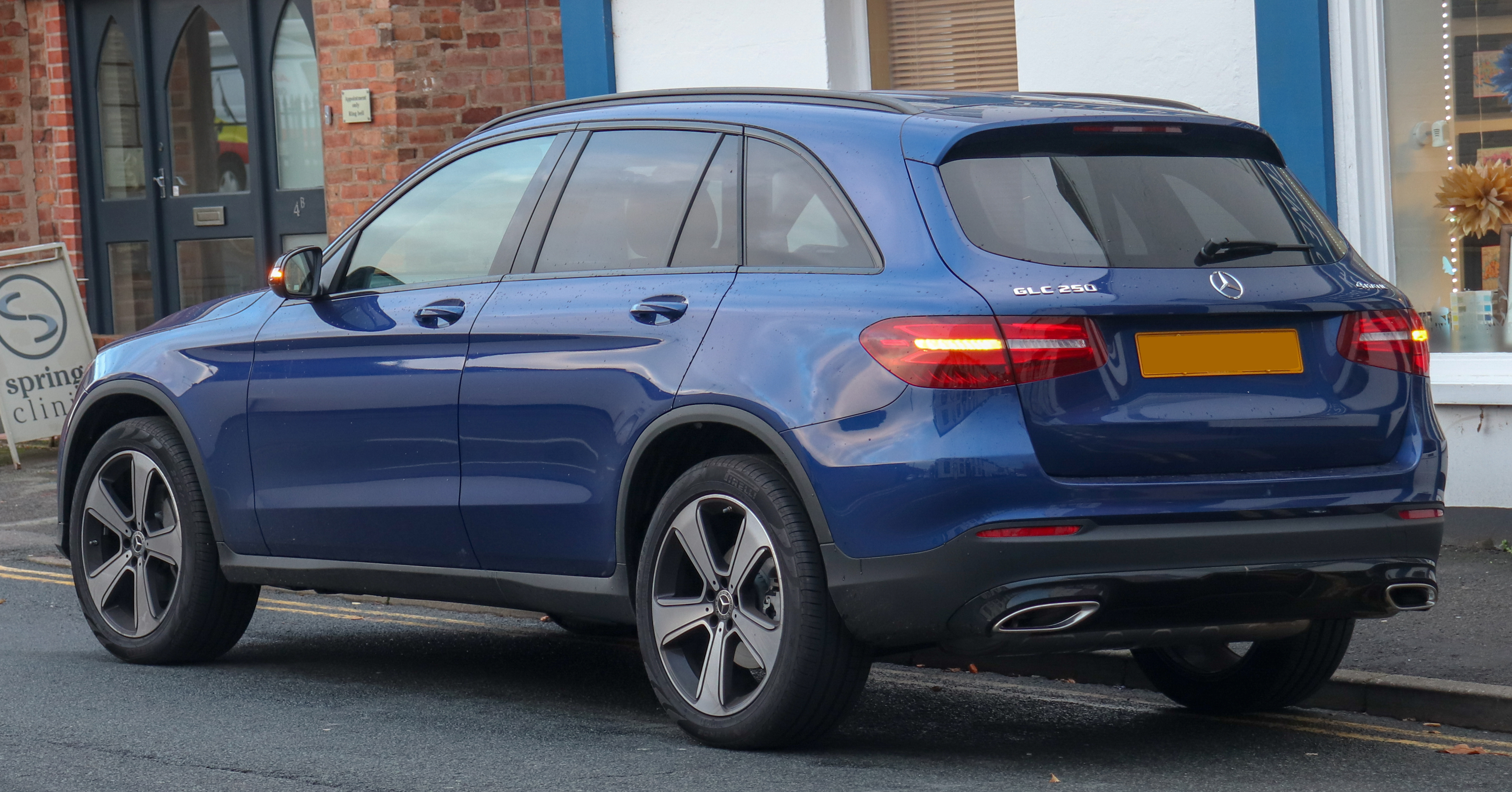
2018 GLC 250 Urban Edition

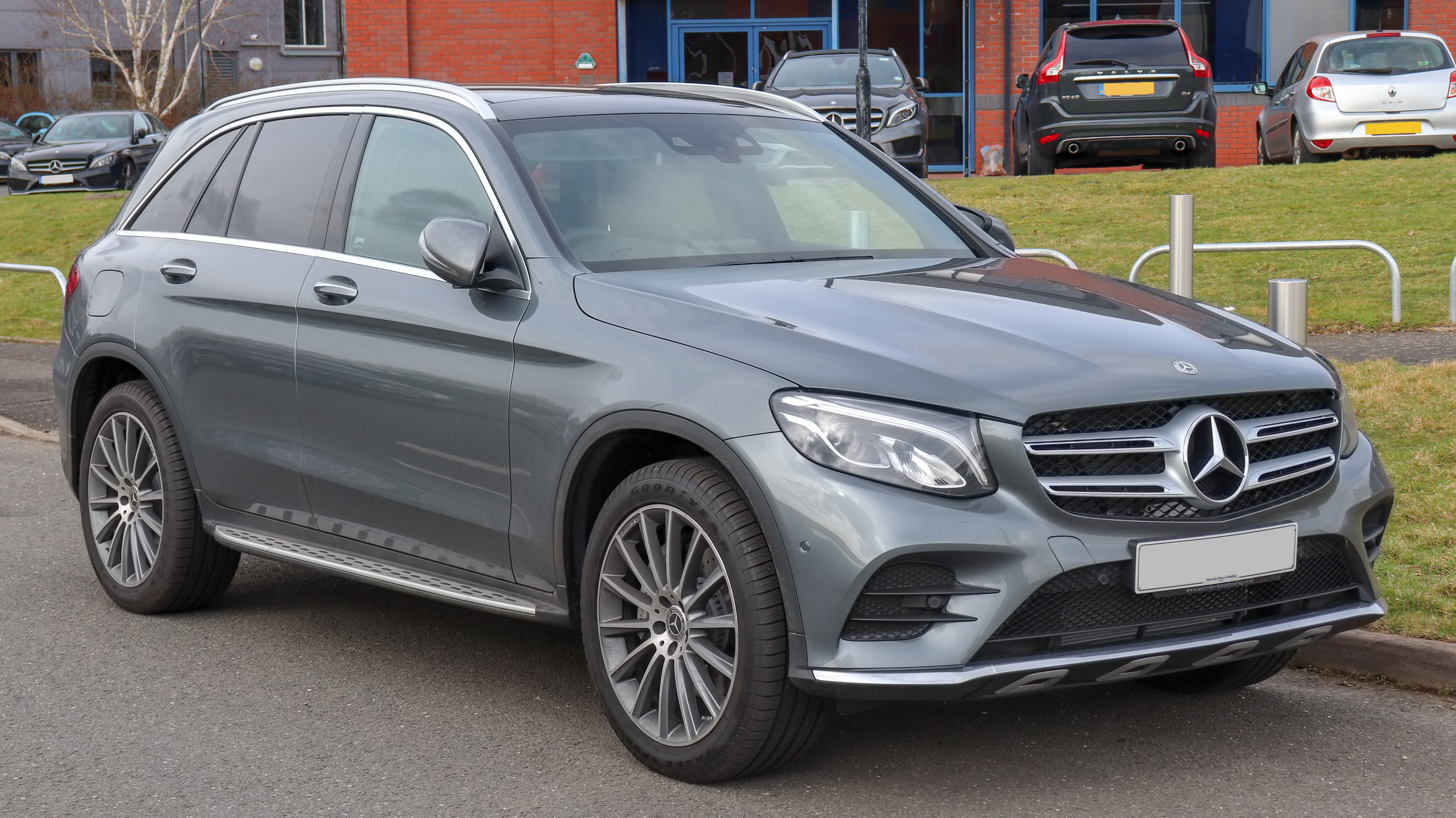
2018 GLC 250d AMG Line

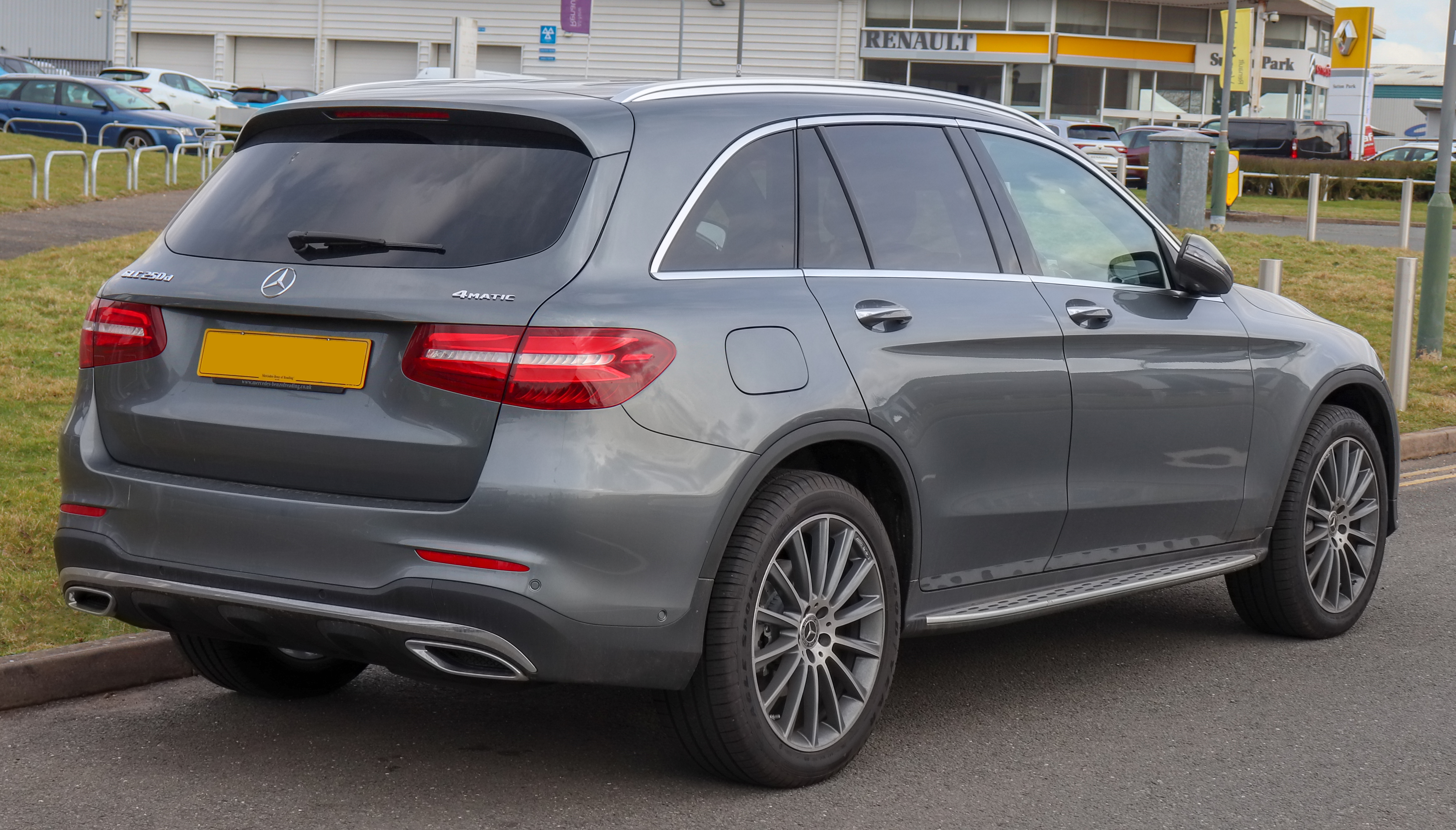
2018 GLC 250d AMG Line

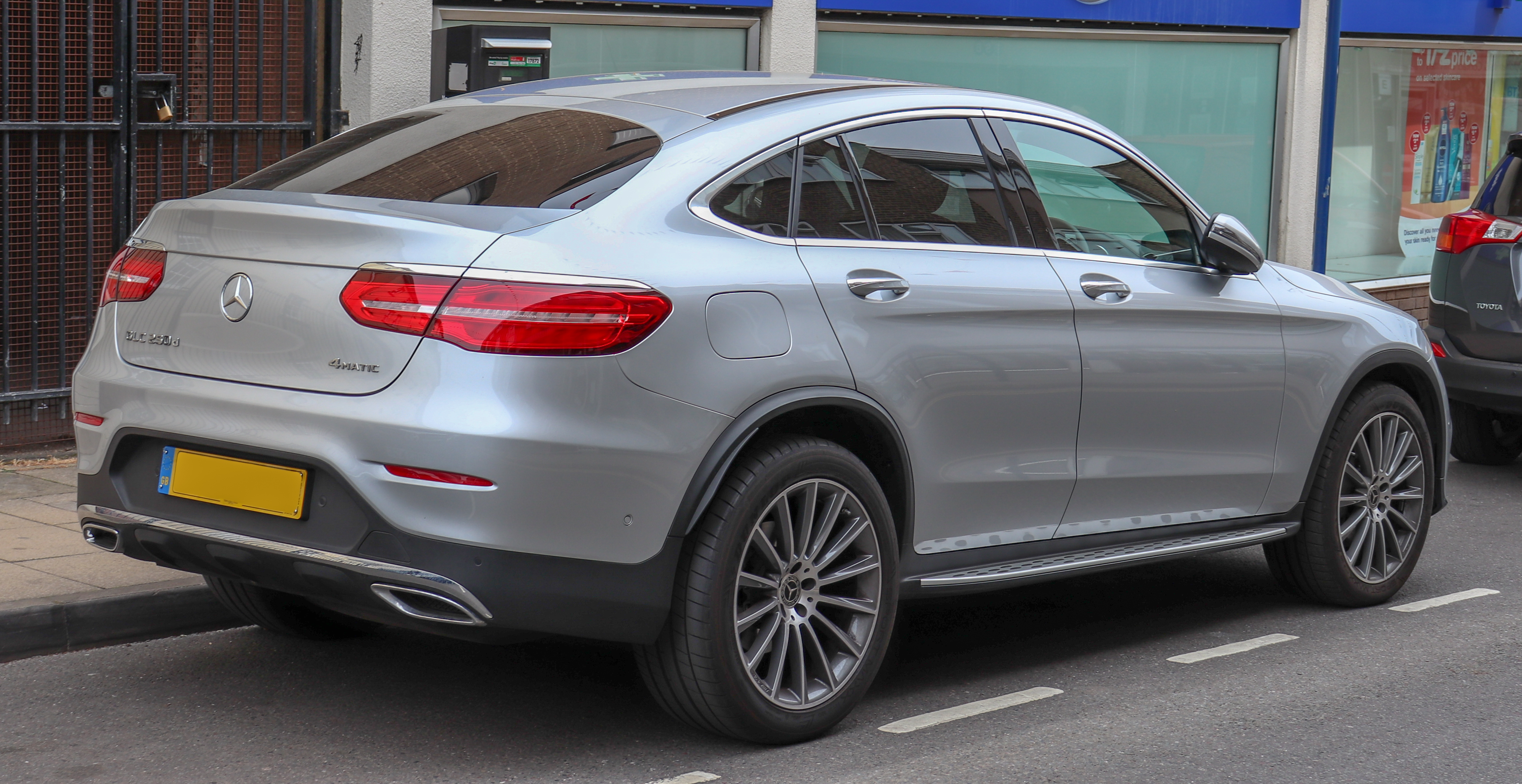
2018 GLC 250d Coupé AMG Line

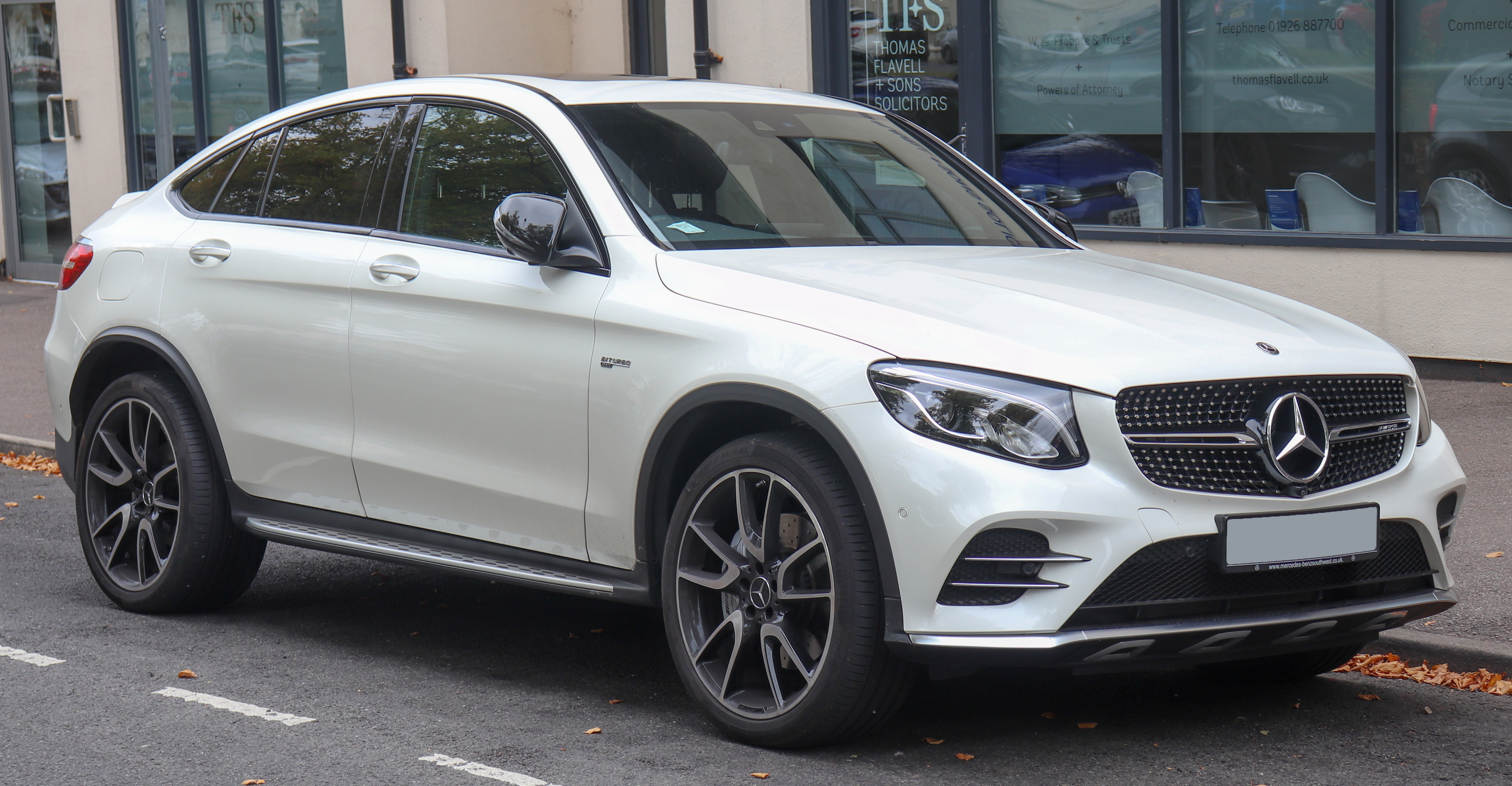
Mercedes-Benz GLC 43 Premium+ AMG

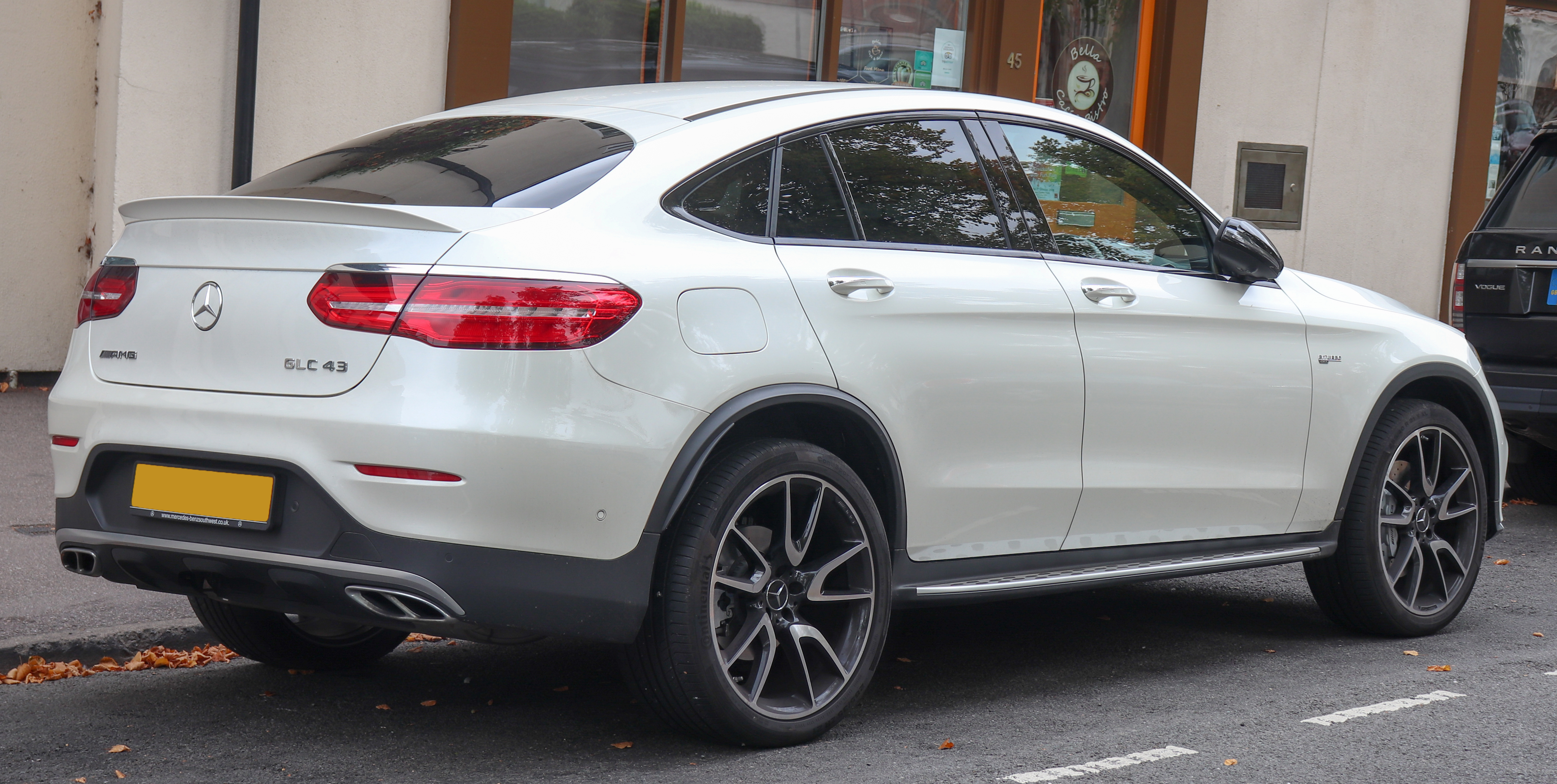
Mercedes-Benz GLC 43 Premium+ AMG

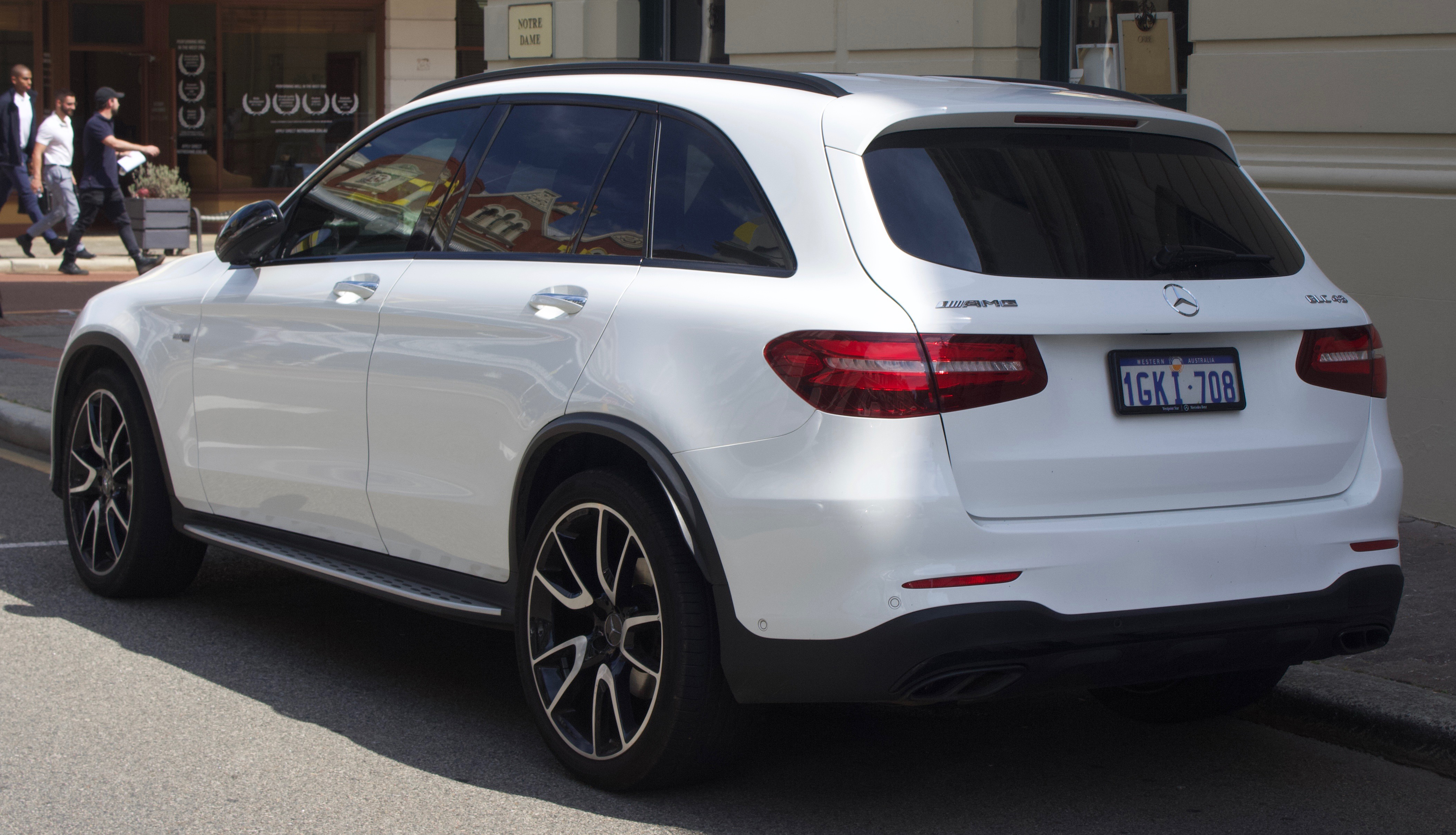
Mercedes-Benz GLC 43 AMG

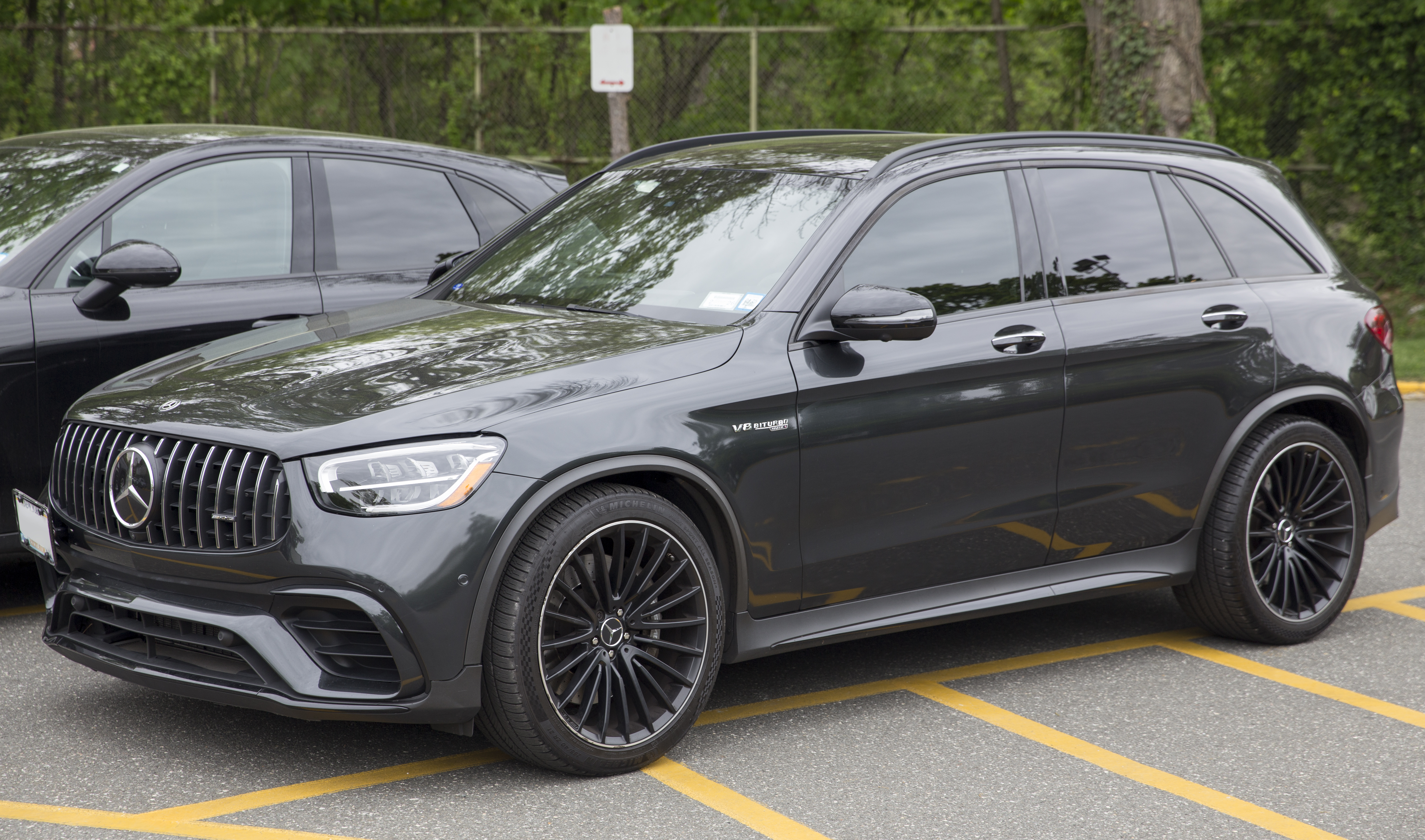
Mercedes-AMG GLC 63

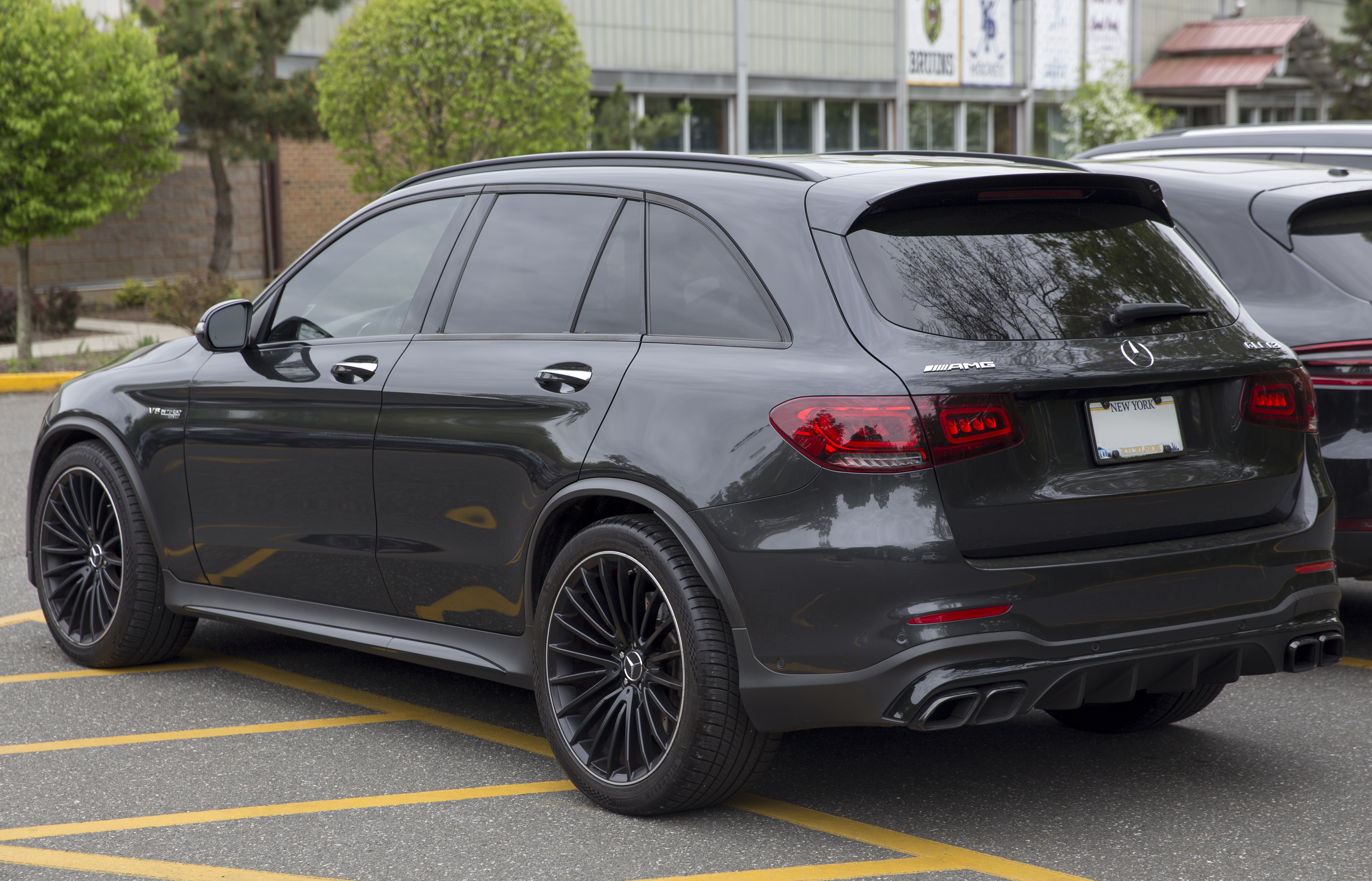
Mercedes-AMG GLC 63

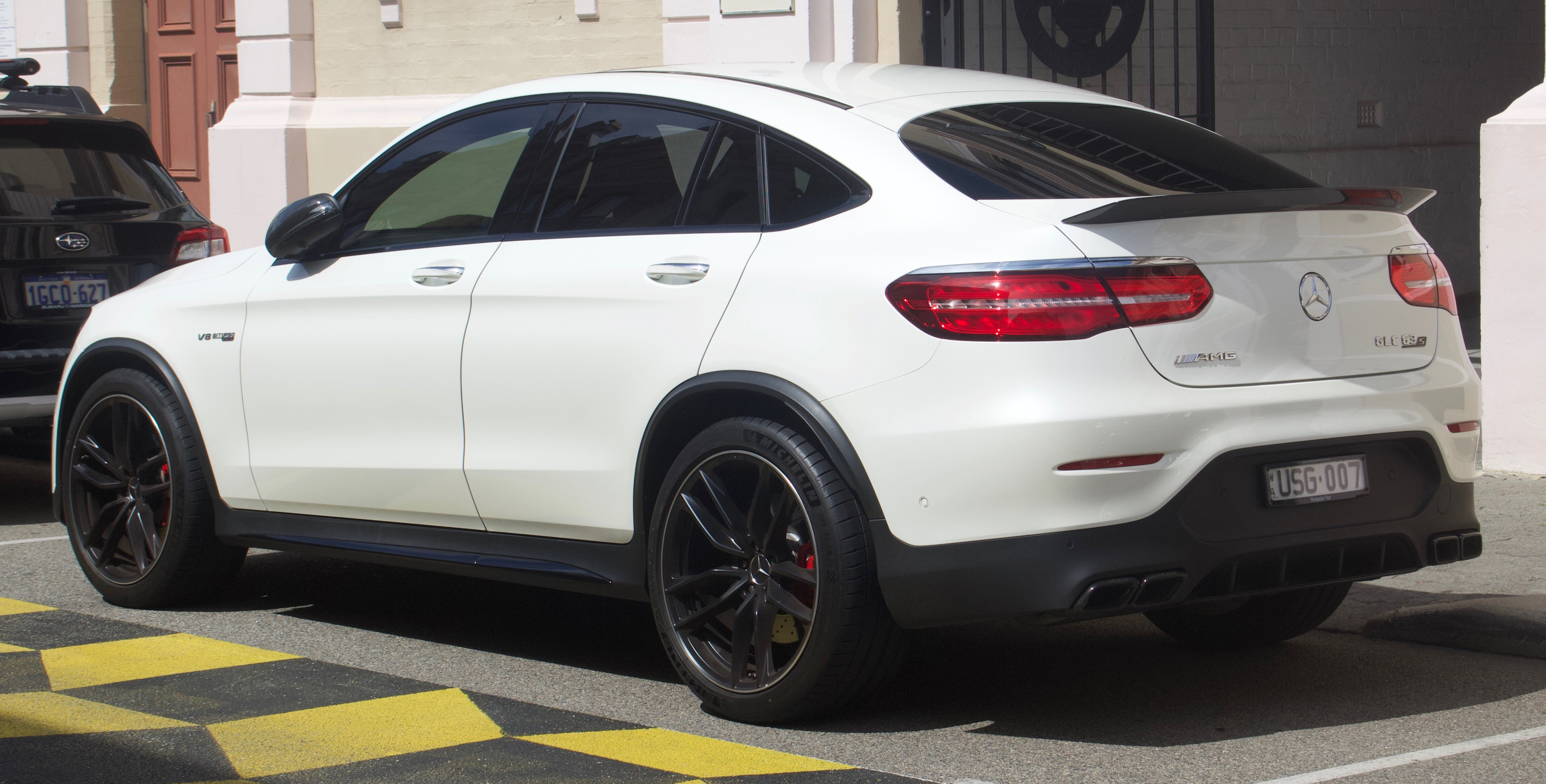
Mercedes-Benz GLC 63 AMG S Coupe

=== GLC L ===
In October 2018, Beijing-Benz introduced a long-wheelbase version of the GLC exclusively for China. The overall length of 4,765 mm (187.6 in) is 109 mm (4.3 in) longer than the regular GLC, while the wheelbase is extended by 100 mm (3.9 in) to 2,973 mm (117.0 in).

The GLC L shares the same engine range as the GLC. Three 2.0-litre turbocharged four-cylinder options are available, with 184 PS (135 kW; 181 hp) in the GLC 200 L 4Matic, 211 PS (155 kW; 208 hp) in the GLC 250 L 4Matic, and 245 PS (180 kW; 242 hp) in the top GLC 300 L 4Matic. All-wheel drive is standard across the range. The standard wheelbase GLC continued to be sold in China alongside the long-wheelbase model.

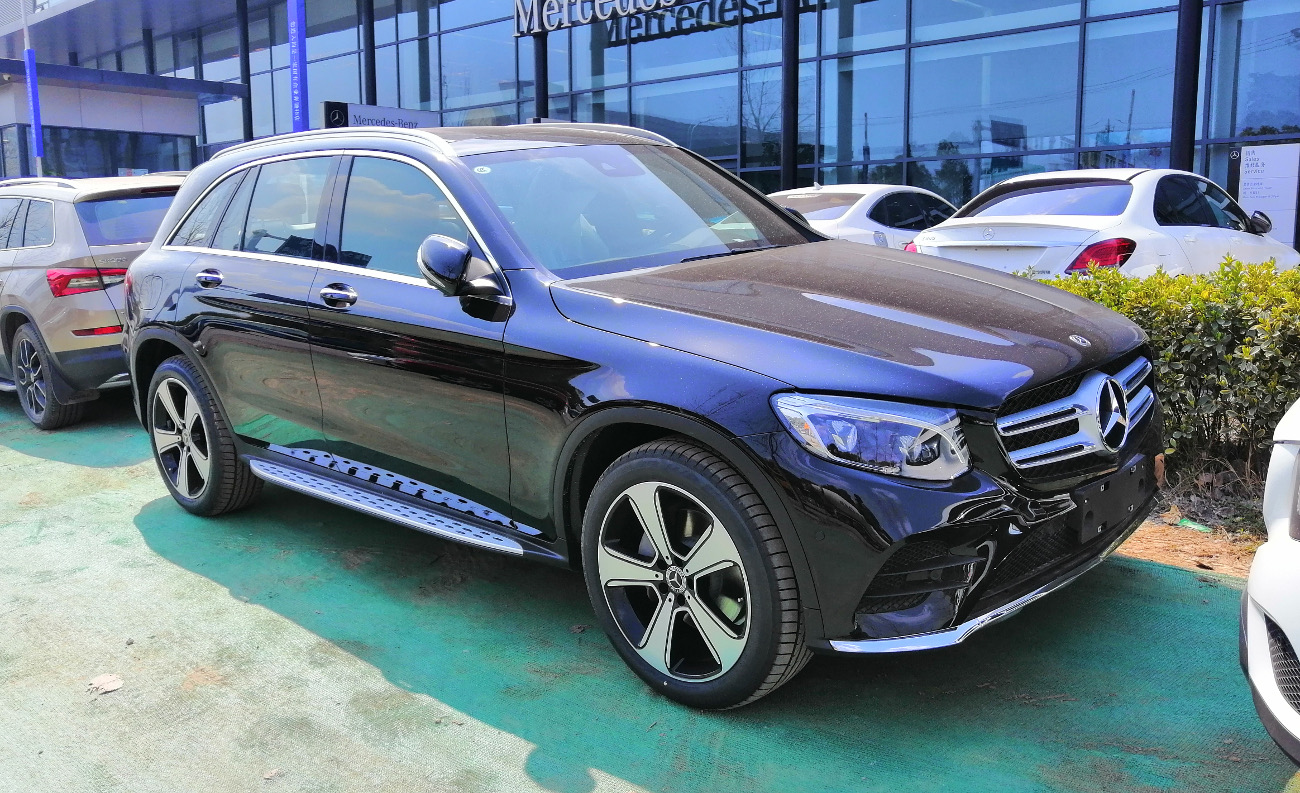
Mercedes-Benz GLC L (China)

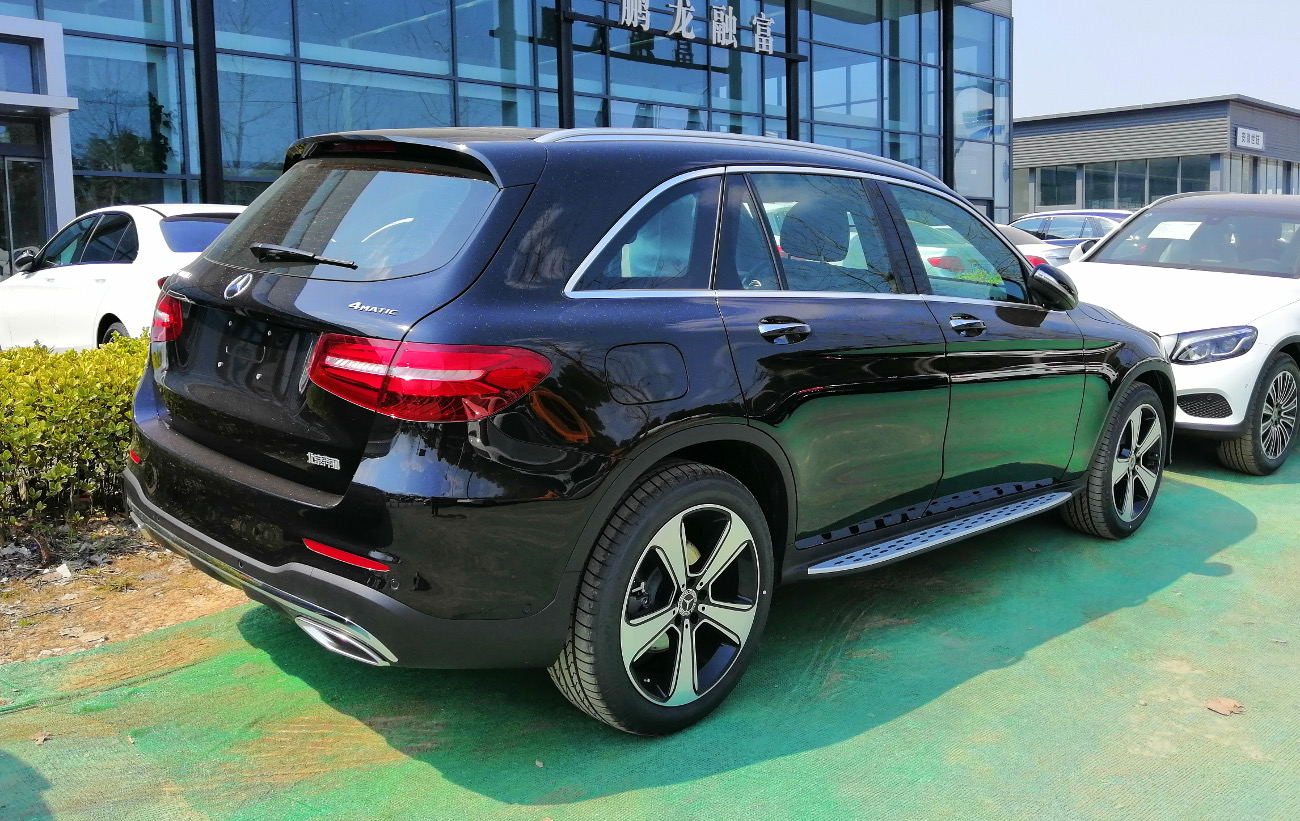
Mercedes-Benz GLC L (China)

=== Powertrain ===
Petrol GLC

Model	Type	Power, torque at rpm
GLC 200	1,991 cc (121 cu in) 16V 4-cylinder turbo	184 PS (135 kW; 181 hp) at 5,500, 300 N⋅m (221 lb⋅ft) at 1,200
GLC 250 4Matic	1,991 cc (121 cu in) 16V 4-cylinder turbo	211 PS (155 kW; 208 hp) at 5,500, 350 N⋅m (258 lb⋅ft) at 1,200
GLC 300	1,991 cc (121 cu in) 16V 4-cylinder turbo	245 PS (180 kW; 242 hp) at 5,550, 370 N⋅m (273 lb⋅ft) at 1,300
GLC 300 4Matic	1,991 cc (121 cu in) 16V 4-cylinder turbo	245 PS (180 kW; 242 hp) at 5,550, 370 N⋅m (273 lb⋅ft) at 1,300
GLC 350e 4Matic	1,991 cc (121 cu in) 16V 4-cylinder turbo + Electric Motor (PHEV)	320 PS (235 kW; 316 hp) at 5,550, 560 N⋅m (413 lb⋅ft) at 1,300
AMG GLC 43	2,996 cc (183 cu in) 24V 6-cylinder twin-turbo	367 PS (270 kW; 362 hp) at 5,550, 520 N⋅m (384 lb⋅ft) at 2,000
AMG GLC 63	3,982 cc (243 cu in) 32V 8-cylinder twin-turbo	476 PS (350 kW; 469 hp) at 5,500, 650 N⋅m (479 lb⋅ft) at 1,750
AMG GLC 63 S	3,982 cc (243 cu in) 32V 8-cylinder twin-turbo	510 PS (375 kW; 503 hp) at 5,500, 700 N⋅m (516 lb⋅ft) at 1,750

Diesel GLC

Model	Years	Engine- turbo	Power, torque at rpm	0-100 km/h (0-62 mph)	Top speed	Transmission
GLC 220d 4Matic	2016- 2020	2,143 cc (131 cu in) 16V I4-cylinder Twin turbo	170 PS (125 kW; 168 hp) at 3,000, 400 N⋅m (295 lb⋅ft) at 1,400	8.3 sec	210 km/h	Daimler-Benz 9G-TRONIC W9A 500
GLC 250d 4Matic	2015- 2019	2,143 cc (131 cu in) 16V I4-cylinder Twin turbo	204 PS (150 kW; 201 hp) at 3,800, 500 N⋅m (369 lb⋅ft) at 1,600	7.6 sec	220 km/h	Daimler-Benz 9G-TRONIC W9A 500
GLC 350d 4Matic	2016- 2020	2,987 cc (182 cu in) 24V V6-cylinder variable geometry turbo	258 PS (190 kW; 254 hp) at 3,400, 620 N⋅m (457 lb⋅ft) at 1,600-2,400	6.5 sec	230 km/h	Daimler-Benz 9G-TRONIC W9A 700

Hydrogen GLC

Model	Type	Power and torque
GLC F-Cell	Electric motor, powered by fuel cell and 13.5kWh battery	211 PS (155 kW; 208 hp), 365 N⋅m (269 lb⋅ft)

Standard features in the US include dual-zone automatic air conditioning; cruise control; Bluetooth System; 8-way power driver and passenger bucket seats; front, front side, side-curtain, and knee airbags.

Petrol GLC Coupé

Model	Type	Power, torque at rpm
GLC 250 4Matic Coupé	1,991 cc (121 cu in) 16V 4-cylinder turbo	211 PS (155 kW; 208 hp) at 5,500, 350 N⋅m (258 lb⋅ft) at 1,200
GLC 300 Coupé	1,991 cc (121 cu in) 16V 4-cylinder turbo	245 PS (180 kW; 242 hp) at 5,550, 370 N⋅m (273 lb⋅ft) at 1,300
GLC 300 4Matic Coupé	1,991 cc (121 cu in) 16V 4-cylinder turbo	245 PS (180 kW; 242 hp) at 5,550, 370 N⋅m (273 lb⋅ft) at 1,300
GLC 350e 4Matic Coupé	1,991 cc (121 cu in) 16V 4-cylinder turbo + Electric Motor (PHEV)	320 PS (235 kW; 316 hp) at 5,550, 560 N⋅m (413 lb⋅ft) at 1,300
AMG GLC 43 Coupé	2,996 cc (183 cu in) 24V 6-cylinder twin-turbo	367 PS (270 kW; 362 hp) at 5,550, 520 N⋅m (384 lb⋅ft) at 2,000
AMG GLC 63 Coupé	3,982 cc (243 cu in) 32V 8-cylinder twin-turbo	476 PS (350 kW; 469 hp) at 5,500, 650 N⋅m (479 lb⋅ft) at 1,750
AMG GLC 63 S Coupé	3,982 cc (243 cu in) 32V 8-cylinder twin-turbo	510 PS (375 kW; 503 hp) at 5,500, 700 N⋅m (516 lb⋅ft) at 1,750

Diesel GLC Coupé

Model	Type	Power, torque at rpm
GLC 220d 4Matic Coupé	2,143 cc (131 cu in) 16V 4-cylinder turbo	170 PS (125 kW; 168 hp) at 3,000, 400 N⋅m (295 lb⋅ft) at 1,400
GLC 250d 4Matic Coupé	2,143 cc (131 cu in) 16V 4-cylinder turbo	204 PS (150 kW; 201 hp) at 3,800, 500 N⋅m (369 lb⋅ft) at 1,600
GLC 350d 4Matic Coupé	2,987 cc (182 cu in) 24V 6-cylinder turbo	258 PS (190 kW; 254 hp) at 3,400, 620 N⋅m (457 lb⋅ft) at 1,600-2,400

=== Facelift 2020 ===
At the 2019 Geneva Motor Show, Mercedes unveiled the refreshed GLC as a 2020 model. New features include an updated MBUX Operating System that can be activated by saying "Hey Mercedes", new engines, a new steering wheel, and a 12.3-inch digital cockpit.

The Coupé-variant was unveiled at 2019 New York International Auto Show.

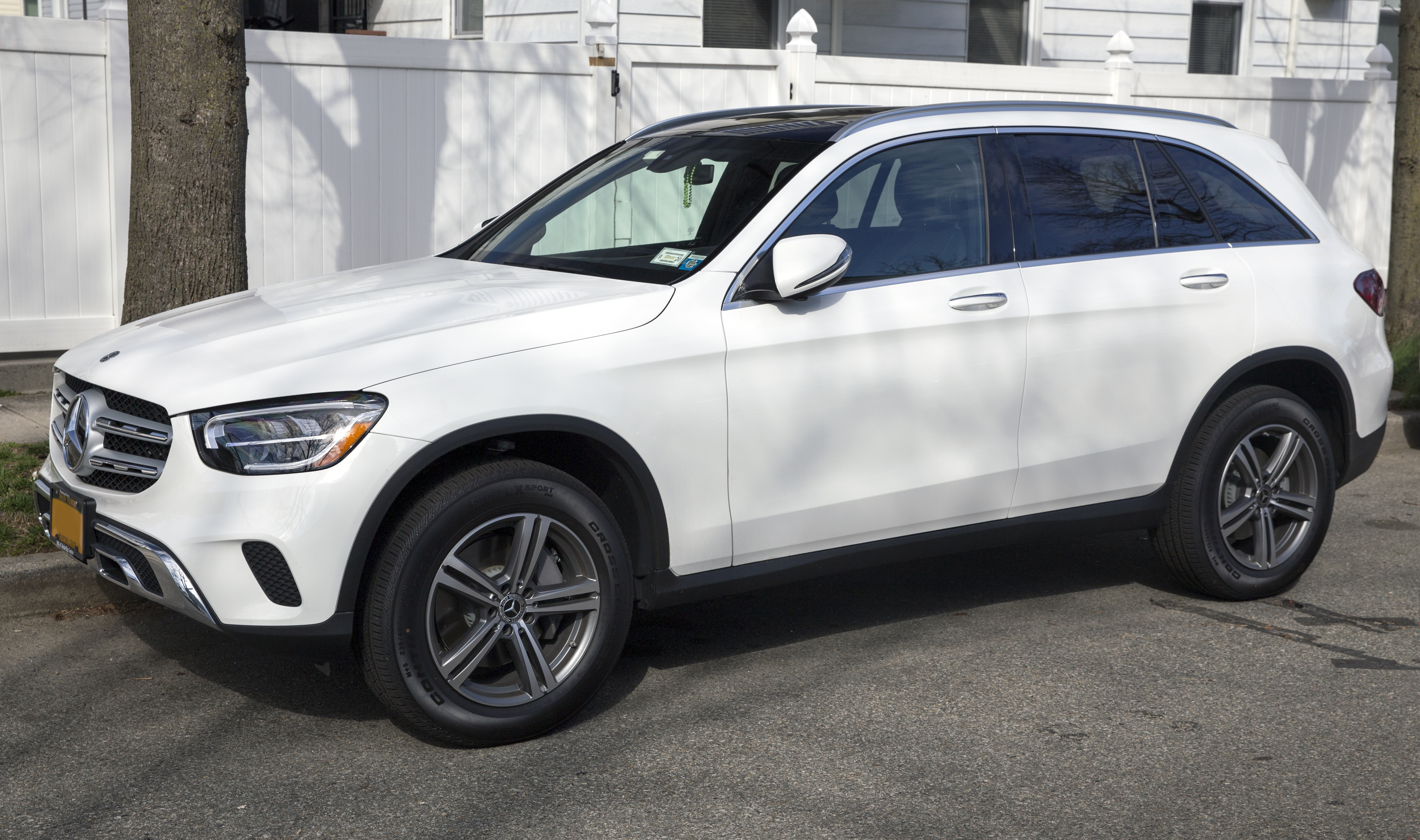
2020 GLC 300 (US; facelift)

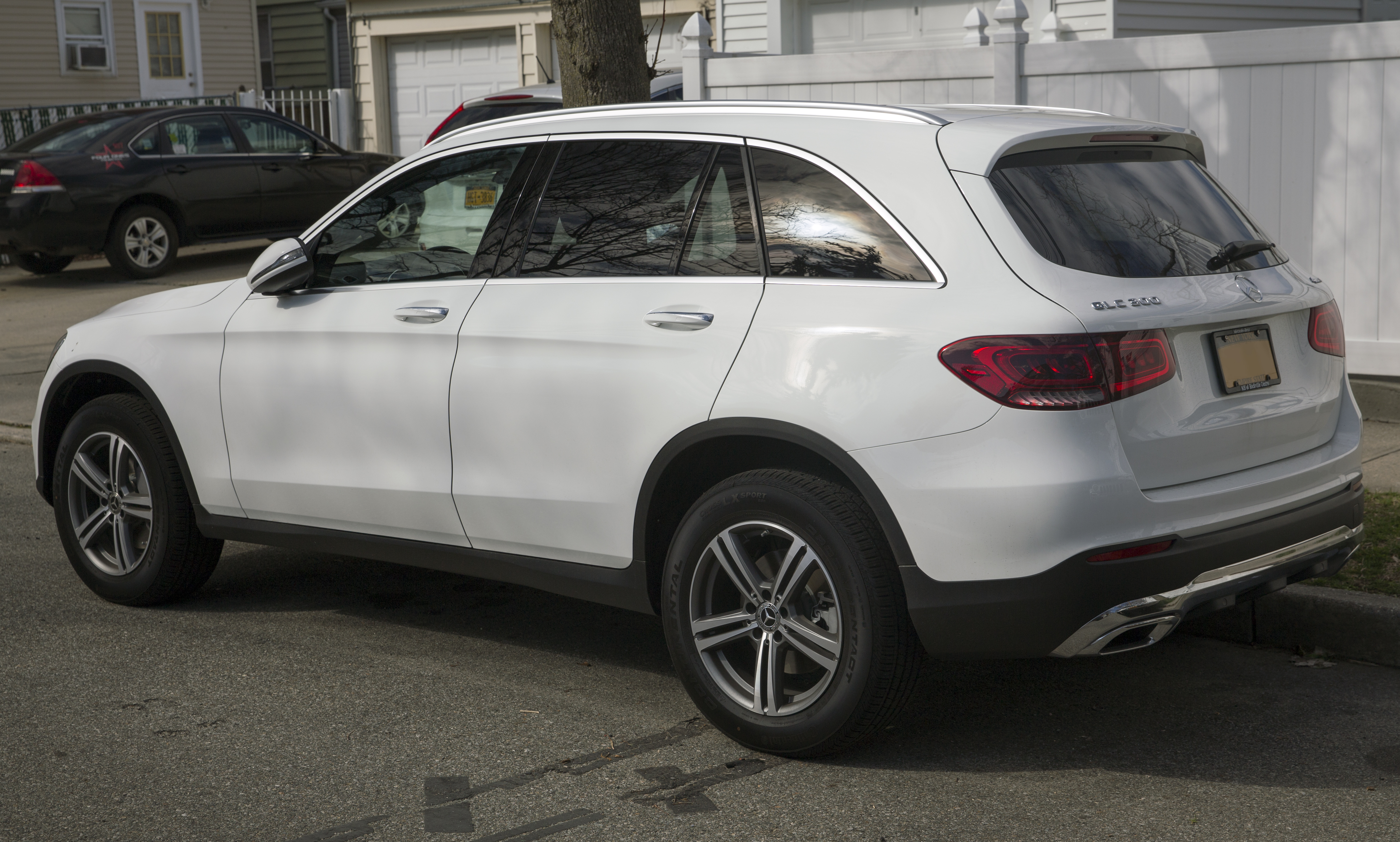
2020 GLC 300 (US; facelift)

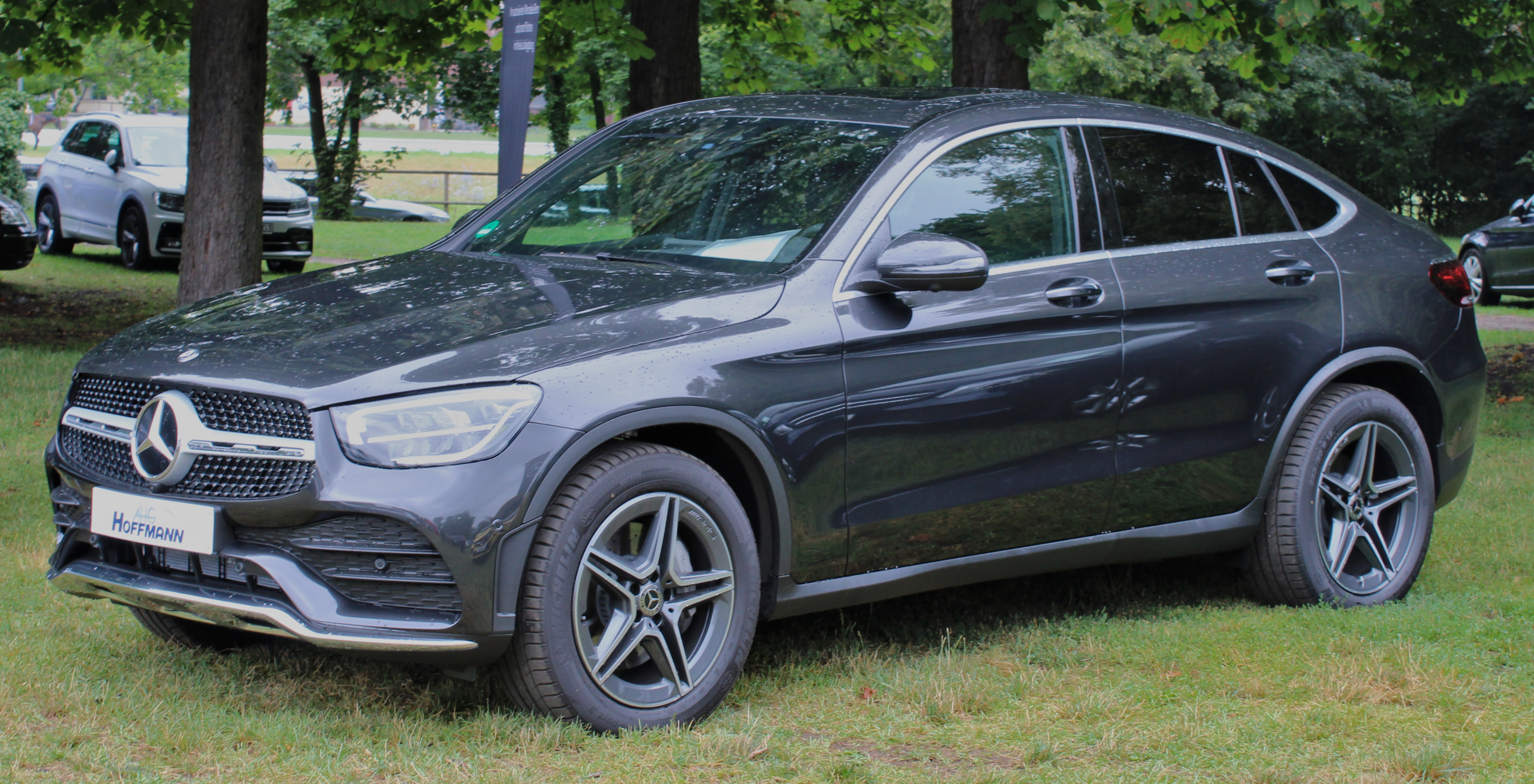
2019 GLC 300 Coupé (facelift)

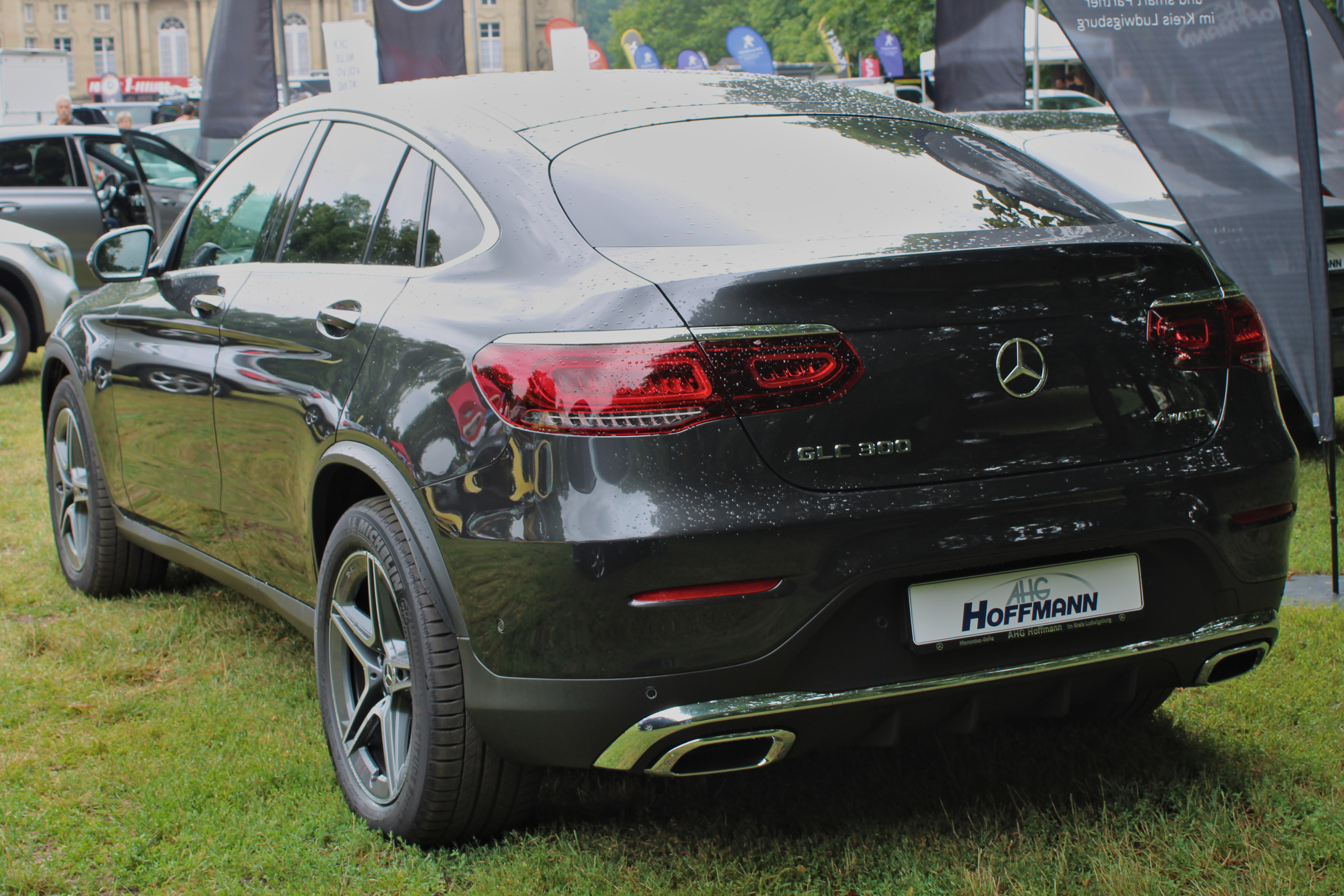
2019 GLC 300 Coupé (facelift)

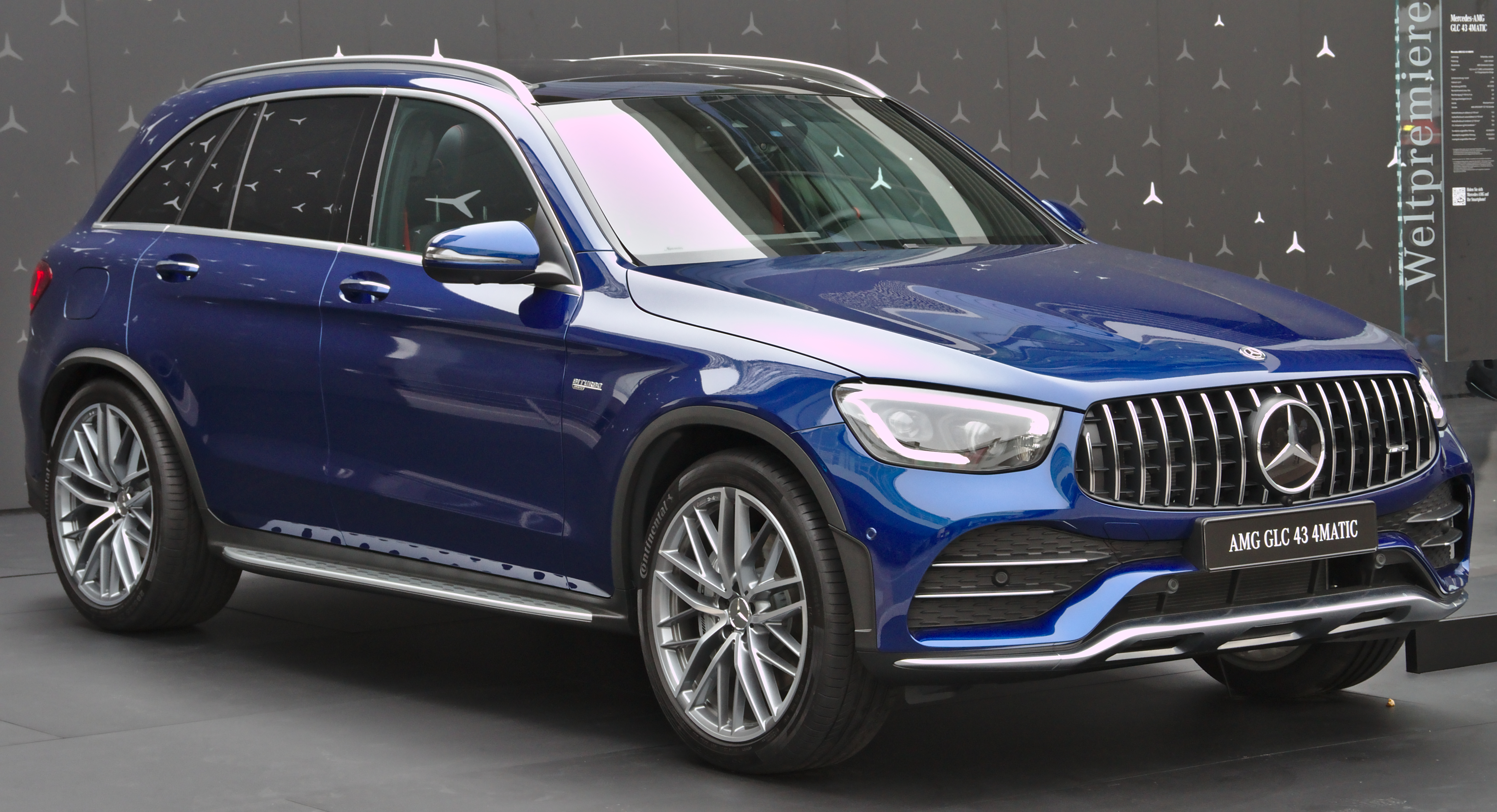
Mercedes-Benz GLC 43 AMG facelift (Germany)

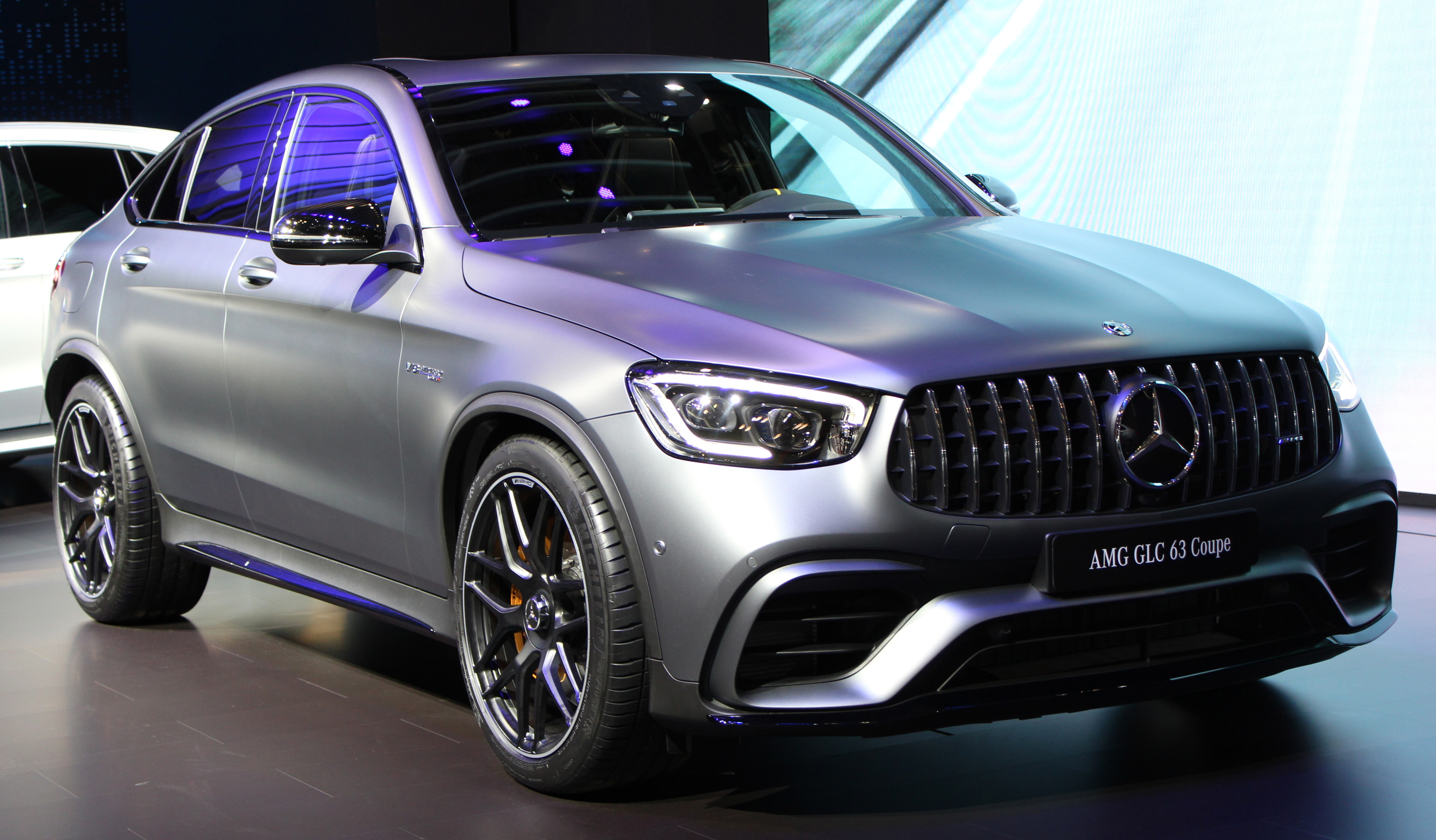
Mercedes-AMG GLC 63 S Coupe facelift (US)

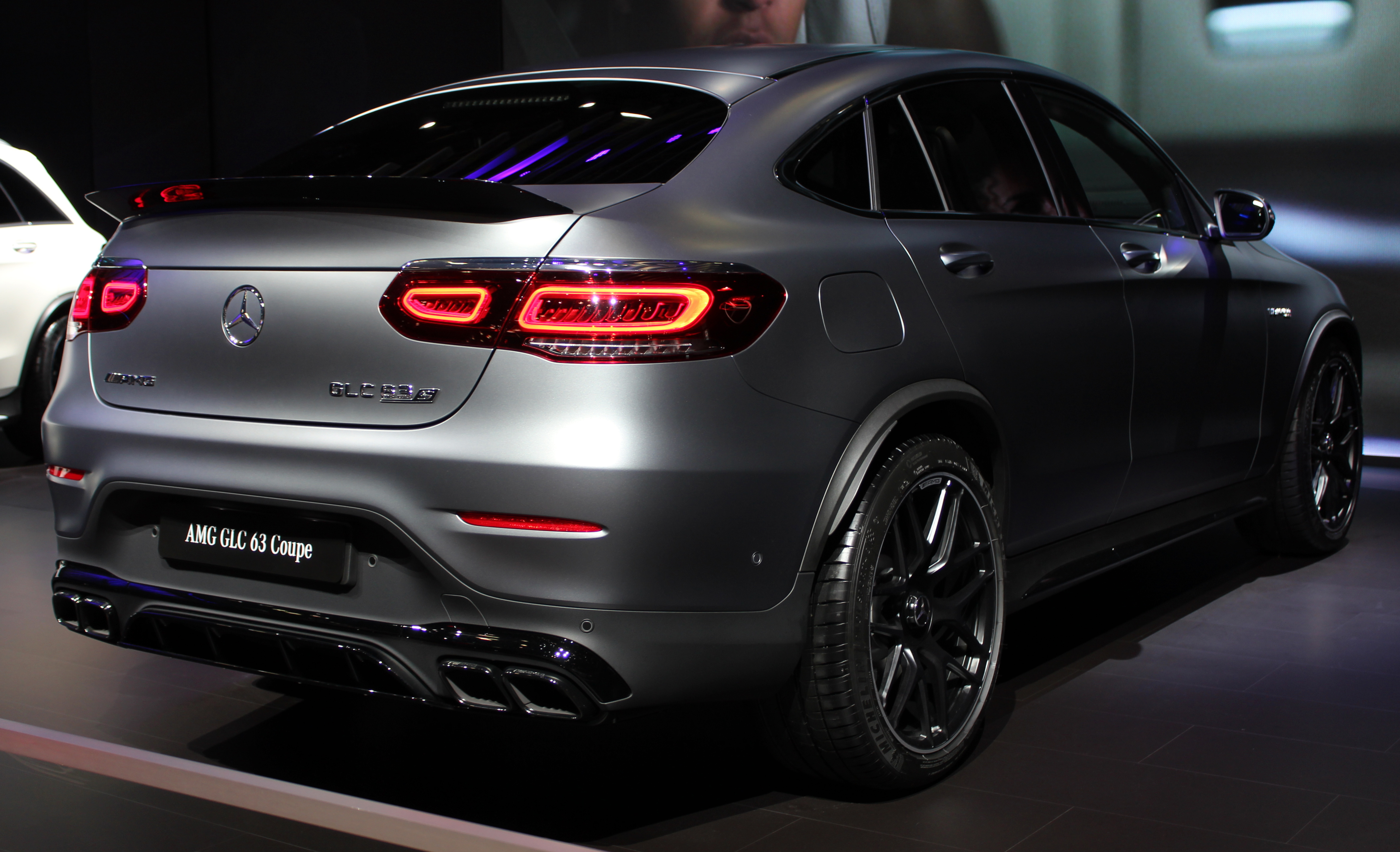
Mercedes-AMG GLC 63 S Coupe facelift (US)

=== Powertrain ===
Model	Years	Displacement	Configuration	Power	Torque	0–100 km/h (0–62 mph)	Top Speed
Petrol Engines
GLC 200 4MATIC	2020–2022	1,991 cc (121.5 cu in)	Inline-4 + 48V Mild Hybrid (M264 E20 DEH LA)	145 kW (197 PS; 194 hp)	320 N⋅m (236 lbf⋅ft)	7.9 seconds	215 km/h (134 mph)
GLC 300	2020–2022	1,991 cc (121.5 cu in)	Inline-4 (M274 DE20 LA)	155 kW (211 PS; 208 hp)	370 N⋅m (273 lbf⋅ft)	6.6 seconds	209 km/h (130 mph)
GLC 300 4MATIC	2020–2022	1,991 cc (121.5 cu in)	Inline-4 (M264 E20 DEH LA)	190 kW (258 PS; 255 hp)	370 N⋅m (273 lbf⋅ft)	6.2 seconds	240 km/h (149 mph)
GLC 300e 4MATIC	2020–2022	1,991 cc (121.5 cu in)	Inline-4 PHEV	245 kW (333 PS; 329 hp)	700 N⋅m (516 lbf⋅ft)	5.7 seconds	TBA
AMG GLC 43 4MATIC	2020–2022	2,996 cc (182.8 cu in)	V6 (M276)	287 kW (390 PS; 385 hp)	521 N⋅m (384 lbf⋅ft)	4.9 seconds	250 km/h (155 mph)
AMG GLC 63 4MATIC+	2020–2022	3,982 cc (243.0 cu in)	V8	350 kW (476 PS; 469 hp)	650 N⋅m (479 lbf⋅ft)	3.8 seconds	250 km/h (155 mph)
AMG GLC 63 S 4MATIC+	2020–2022	3,982 cc (243.0 cu in)	V8	375 kW (510 PS; 503 hp)	700 N⋅m (516 lbf⋅ft)	3.8 seconds	250 km/h (155 mph)
Diesel Engines
GLC 200d / GLC 200d 4MATIC	2020–2022	1,950 cc (119 cu in)	Inline-4	120 kW (163 PS; 161 hp)	360 N⋅m (266 lbf⋅ft)	8.9 seconds	205 km/h (127 mph)
GLC 220d 4MATIC	2020–2022	1,950 cc (119 cu in)	Inline-4	143 kW (194 PS; 192 hp)	400 N⋅m (295 lbf⋅ft)	7.9 seconds	215 km/h (134 mph)
GLC 300d 4MATIC	2020–2022	1,950 cc (119 cu in)	Inline-4	180 kW (245 PS; 241 hp)	500 N⋅m (369 lbf⋅ft)	6.6 seconds	230 km/h (143 mph)
GLC 400d 4MATIC	2020–2022	2,925 cc (178.5 cu in)	Inline-6	243 kW (330 PS; 326 hp)	700 N⋅m (516 lbf⋅ft)	5.1 seconds	240 km/h (149 mph)
GLC 300de	2020–2022	1,950 cc (119 cu in)	Inline-4 PHEV	143 kW (194 PS; 192 hp) (engine) + 77 kW (105 PS; 103 hp) (electric motors) 225 kW (306 PS; 302 hp) (combined)	400 N⋅m (295 lbf⋅ft) (engine) + 300 N⋅m (221 lbf⋅ft) (electric motors)700 N⋅m (516 lbf⋅ft) (combination)	6.2 seconds	230 km/h (143 mph)

=== GLC F-CELL ===
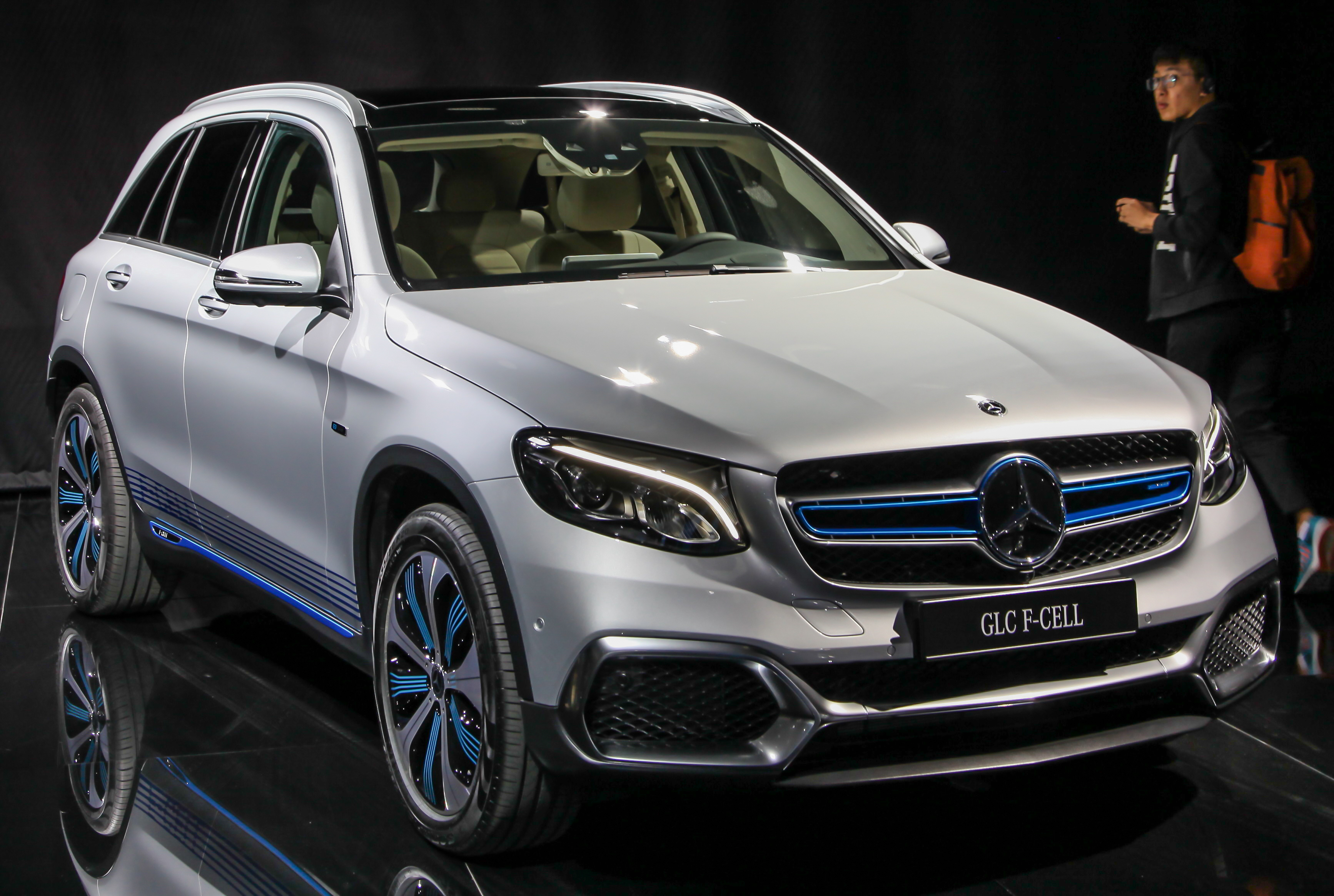
GLC F-Cell (preproduction model)

Daimler tested a fleet of fuel cell-powered GLC models, dubbed GLC F-CELL, which entered production in 2018. It features both fuel cells and a battery drive which can be charged externally. Apart from electricity, it also runs on pure hydrogen.

=== Safety ===
Euro NCAP test results Mercedes-Benz GLC 220d 4MATIC Exclusive (2015)
Test	Points	%
Overall:	5 /5 stars	
Adult occupant:	36.4	95%
Child occupant:	43.7	89%
Pedestrian:	29.7	82%
Safety assist:	9.3	71%

ANCAP test results Mercedes-Benz GLC (2015, aligned with Euro NCAP)
Test	Points	%
Overall:	5 /5 stars	
Adult occupant:	36.4	95%
Child occupant:	43.7	89%
Pedestrian:	29.7	82%
Safety assist:	9.3	71%

ANCAP test results Mercedes-Benz GLC (2023, aligned with Euro NCAP)
Test	Points	%
Overall:	5 /5 stars	
Adult occupant:	35.20	92%
Child occupant:	45.39	92%
Pedestrian:	40.41	74%
Safety assist:	13.57	84%

== Second generation (X254/C254/V254; 2022) ==
Second generation
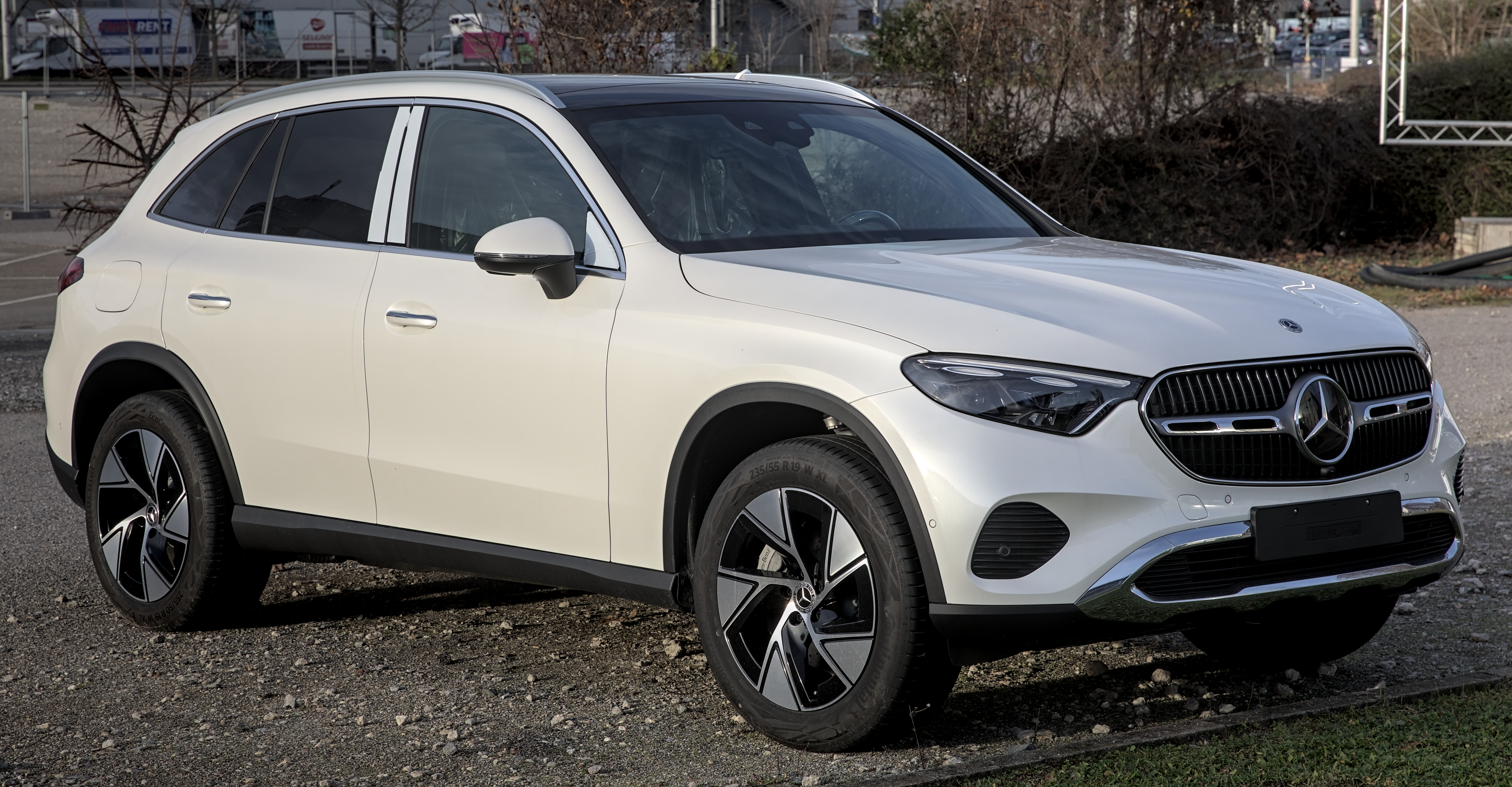
- 2022 GLC 400e

Overview
- Model code: X254; C254 (Coupé); V254 (long-wheelbase)
- Production: 2022–present
- Assembly: Germany: Bremen; Sindelfingen; China: Beijing (Beijing Benz for L models); Thailand: Samut Prakan (TAAP); Indonesia: Bogor (MBI); Malaysia: Pekan (HICOM); United States: Tuscaloosa, Alabama (MBUSI, commencing 2027)
- Designer: Bastian Baudy

Body and chassis
- Body style: 5-door SUV; 5-door coupe SUV
- Platform: MRA2
- Related: Mercedes-Benz C-Class (W206)

Powertrain
- Engine: Petrol: 2.0 L M254 E20 mild hybrid turbo (EQ Boost) I4; 2.0 L M139 mild hybrid E-Turbo I4 (EQ Boost; GLC43); Petrol plug-in hybrid: 2.0 L M254 E20 PHEV turbo (EQ Power+) I4; 2.0 L M139 turbo I4 e-Performance PHEV (GLC63 S E Performance); Diesel: 2.0 L OM654 mild hybrid turbo (EQ Boost) I4; 3.0 L OM656 mild hybrid turbo (EQ Boost) I6; Diesel plug-in hybrid: 2.0 L OM654 turbo I4 PHEV
- Electric motor: List: 5 kW (7 PS; 7 hp) Borg Warner electric compressor + 17.1 kW (23 PS; 23 hp) Mitsubishi Crankshaft ISG system belt-driven starter-generator (RSG) 48V (EQ Boost); 100 kW (136 PS; 134 hp) Schaeffler PSM P2 Hybrid Module High Voltage gearbox-mounted electric motor (PHEV)
- Power output: List: 150 kW (204 PS; 201 hp) (GLC 200 4Matic); 190 kW (258 PS; 255 hp) (GLC 300 4Matic); 230 kW (313 PS; 308 hp) (GLC 300e 4Matic); 284 kW (386 PS; 381 hp) (GLC 400e 4Matic); 147 kW (200 PS; 197 hp) (GLC 220d 4Matic); 245 kW (333 PS; 329 hp) (GLC 300de 4Matic)
- Transmission: 9-speed 9G-Tronic automatic
- Hybrid drivetrain: Mild hybrid (EQ Boost); Plug-in hybrid
- Battery: 31.2 kWh lithium-ion

Dimensions
- Wheelbase: 2,888 mm (113.7 in); 2,977 mm (117.2 in) (GLC L, China)
- Length: 4,716 mm (185.7 in); 4,769 mm (187.8 in) (GLC Coupé); 4,826 mm (190.0 in) (GLC L, China)
- Width: 1,890 mm (74.4 in); 1,920 mm (75.6 in) (GLC Coupé)
- Height: 1,640 mm (64.6 in); 1,606 mm (63.2 in) (GLC Coupé); 1,716 mm (67.6 in) (GLC L, China)

The second generation GLC was unveiled in June 2022. Like the first generation, two bodystyles are available, with a traditional SUV and a coupe SUV called the GLC Coupé. Similar to the W206 C-Class, all models are equipped with four-cylinder engines with MHEV tech. Four PHEV models, which consists of three general models, and one AMG model, are available. The X254 GLC is also larger than its predecessor. The mainline GLC 4Matic models and AMG GLC43 continue to use permanent AWD with an open double-planetary type center differential. The two axles are linked by a pre-loaded two plate clutch with a locking action of 50nM. Two versions of Magna's Trumax open center differential transfer case are used. The non-AMG models use the version geared for a 45/55 front-to-rear torque split. AMG GLC43 models are offered with the more rear-biased AMG-Performance Permanent AWD, which uses a center differential geared for a 31/69 front-to-rear torque split. The AMG GLC63 uses the AMG-Performance 4Matic+ AWD. This system replaces the open center differential with an electronically controlled multi-disc clutch which enables stepless coupling of the front axle to the drivetrain. The rear axle is permanently driven. Drive torque distribution to the front axle is infinitely variable throughout the range of between 0 and 50% of total gearbox output torque.

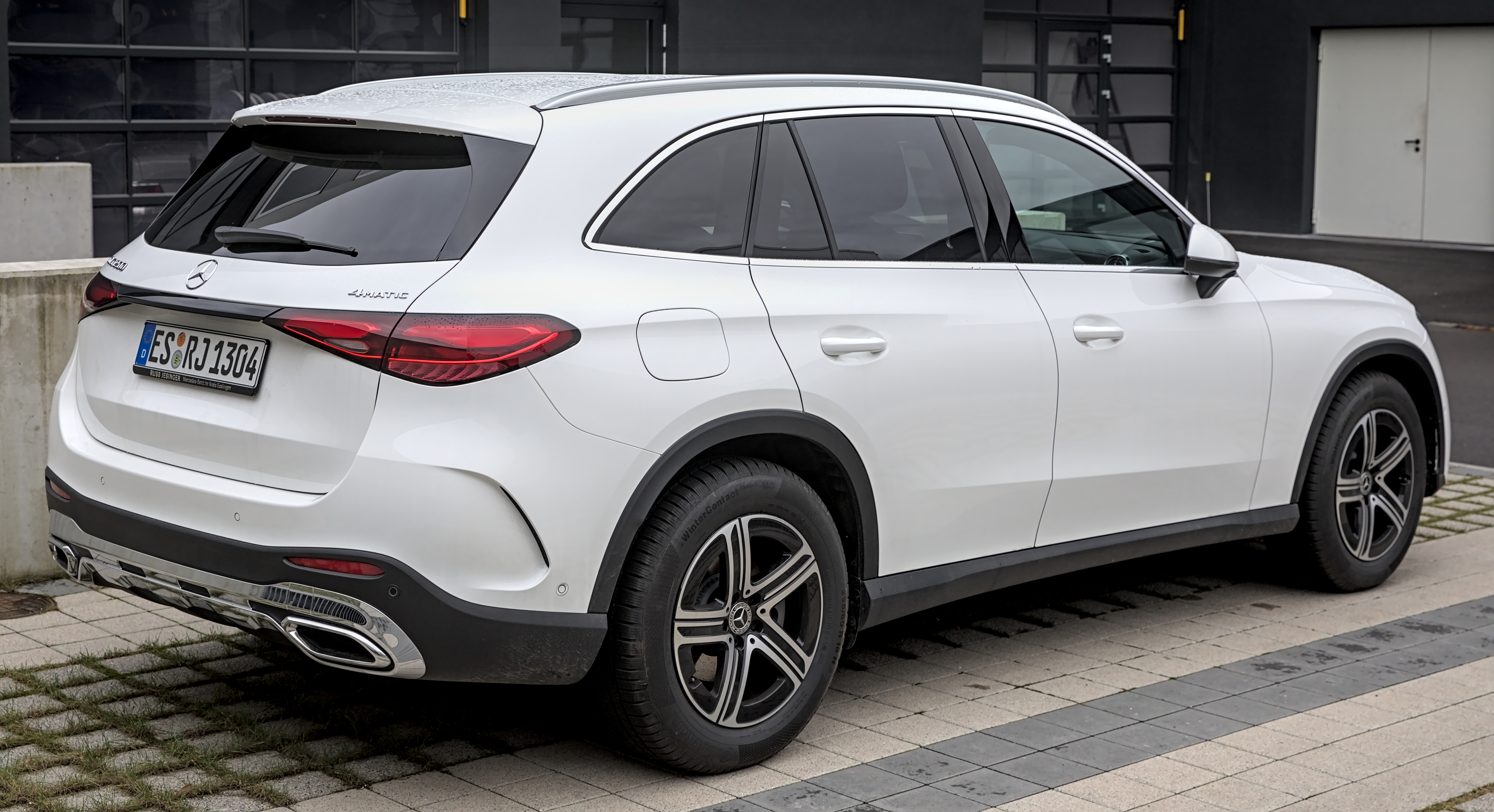
Rear view

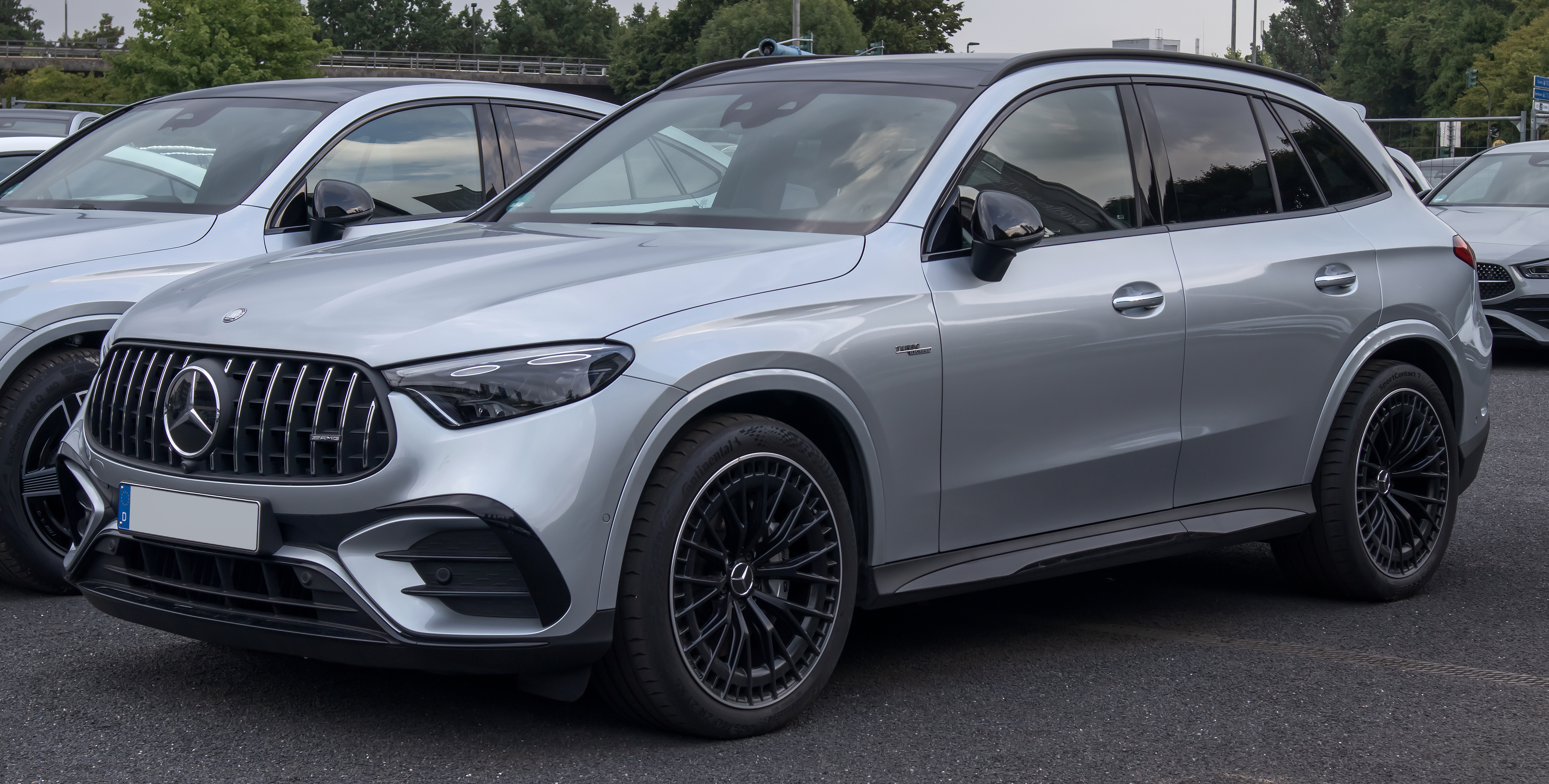
Mercedes-Benz GLC 43 AMG

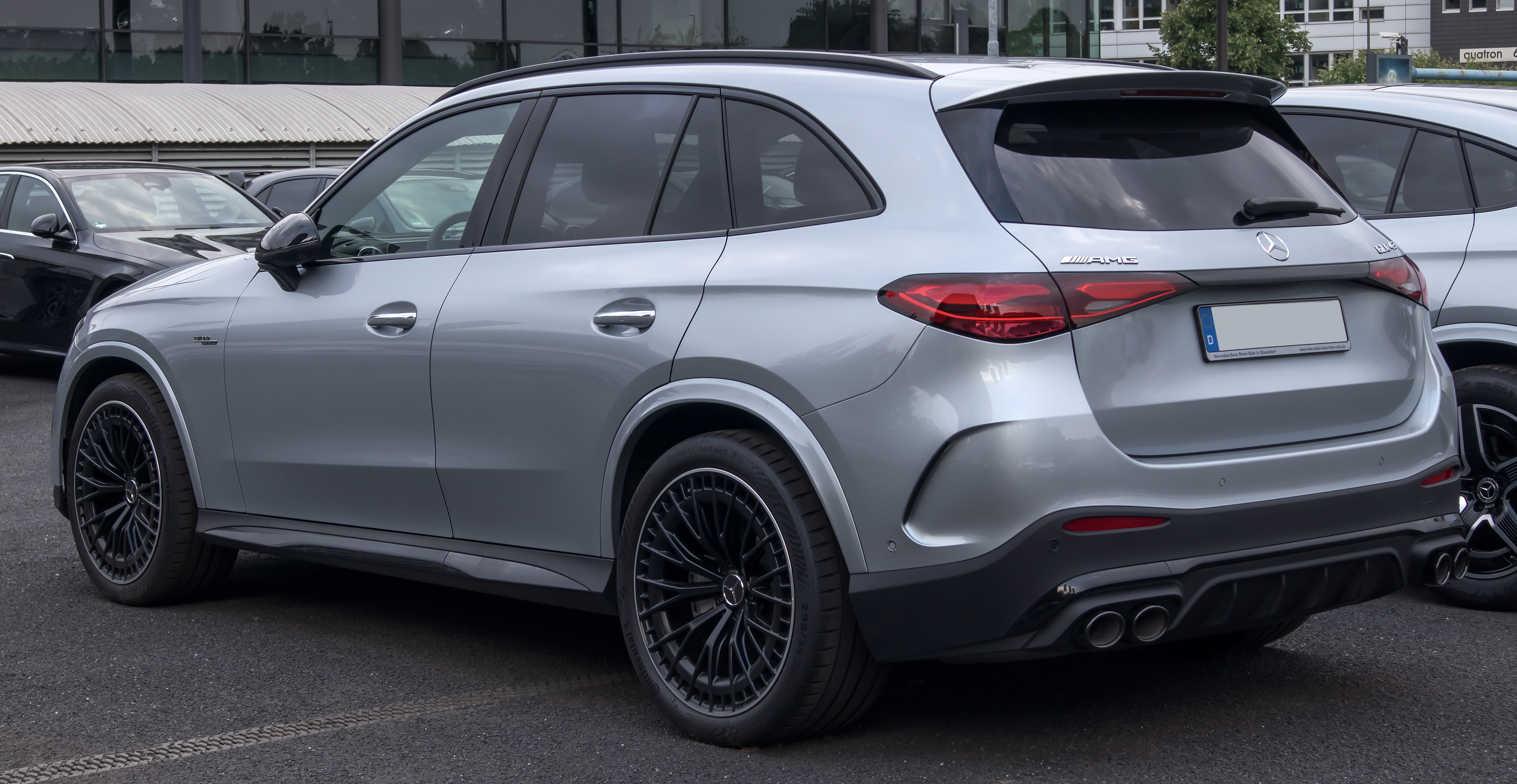
43 AMG (Rear view)

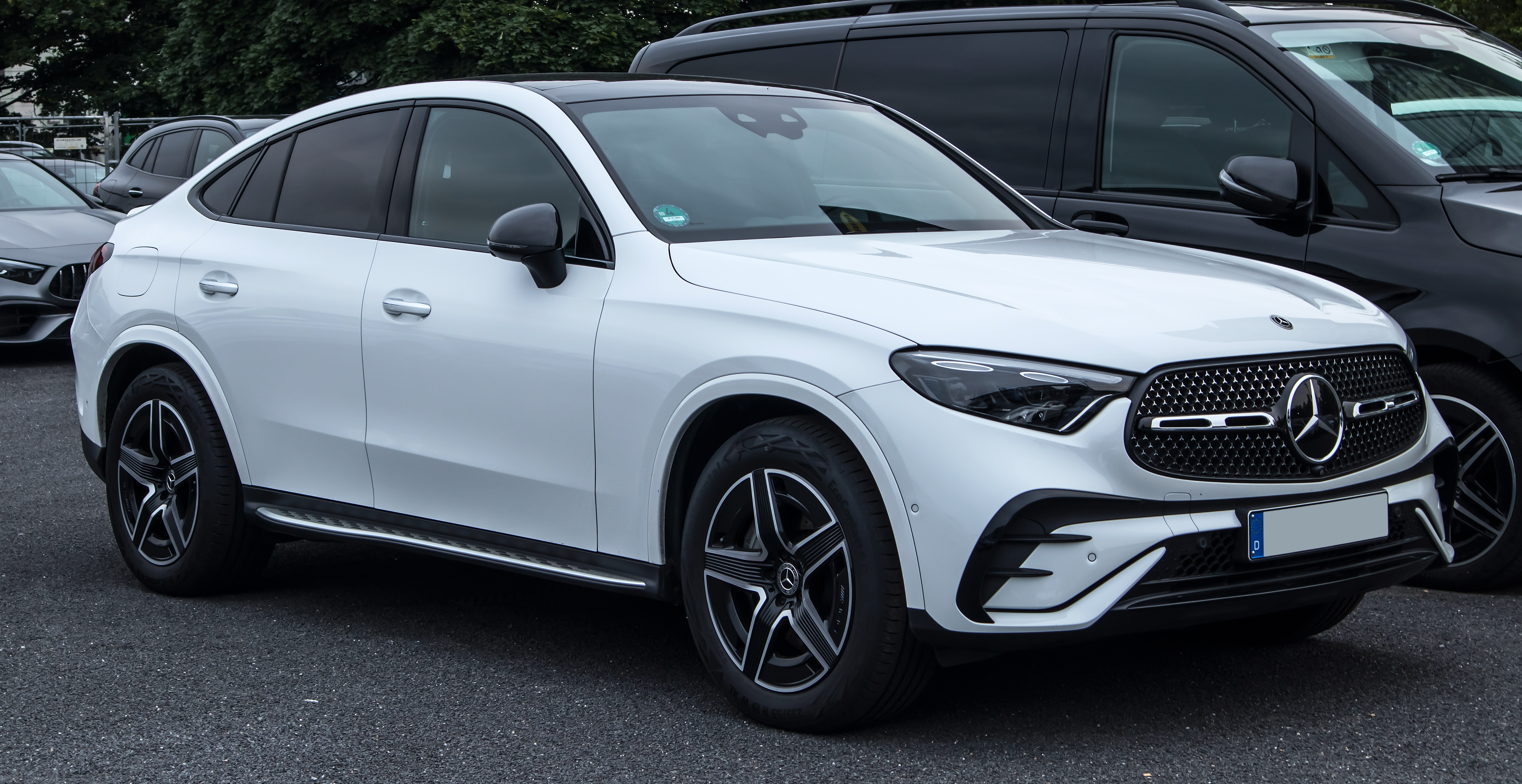
Coupe

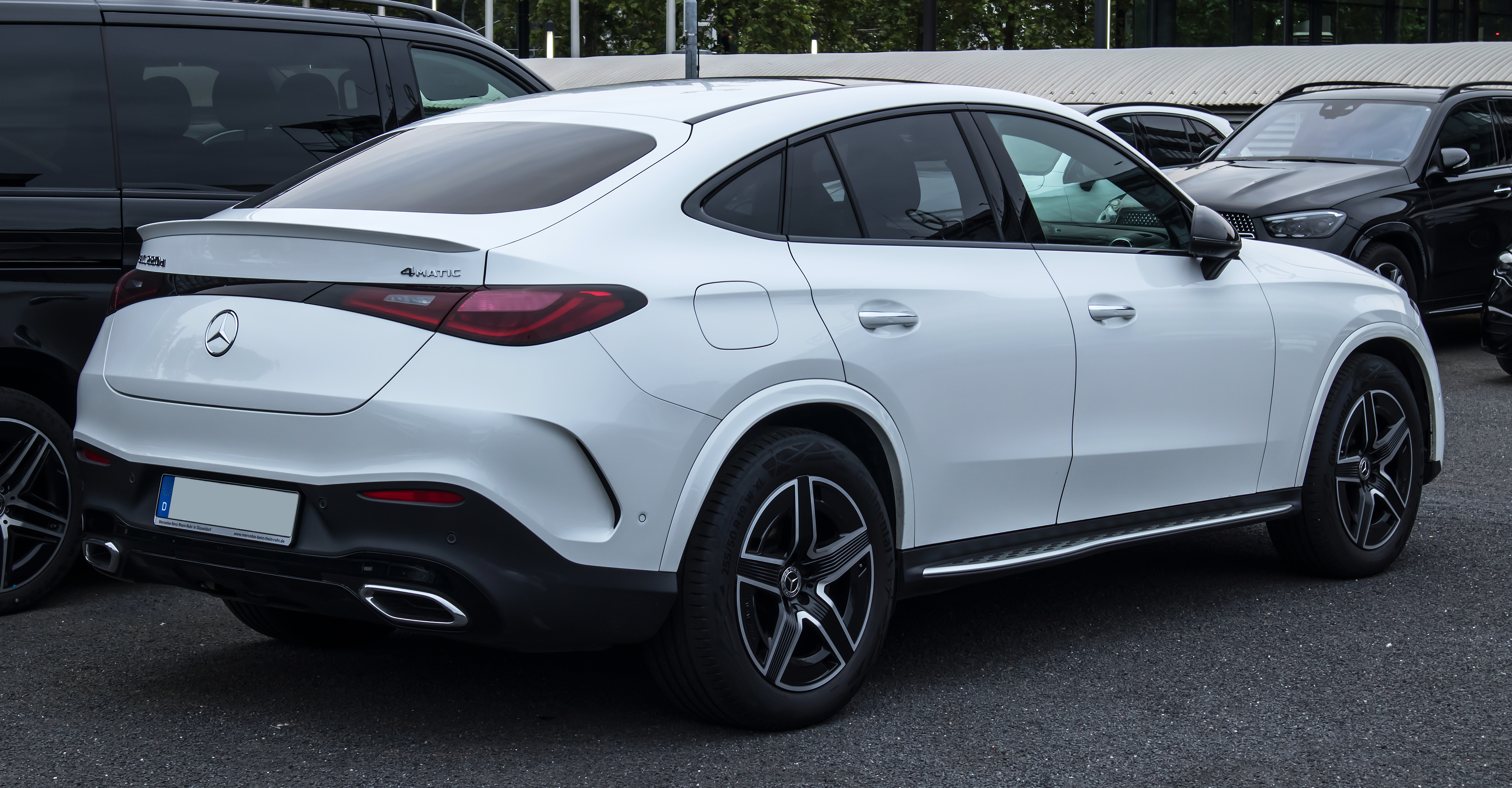
Coupe (Rear view)

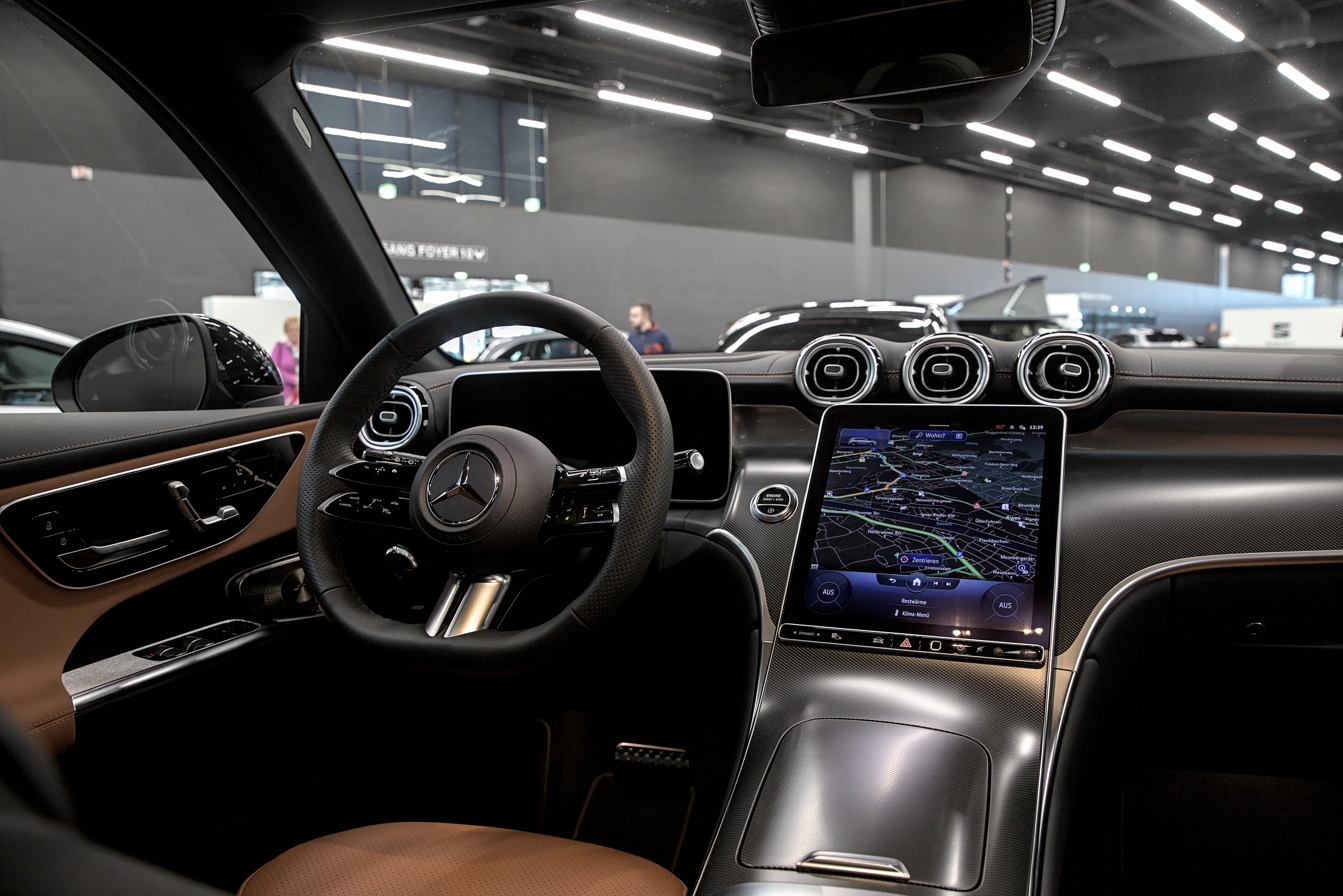
Interior

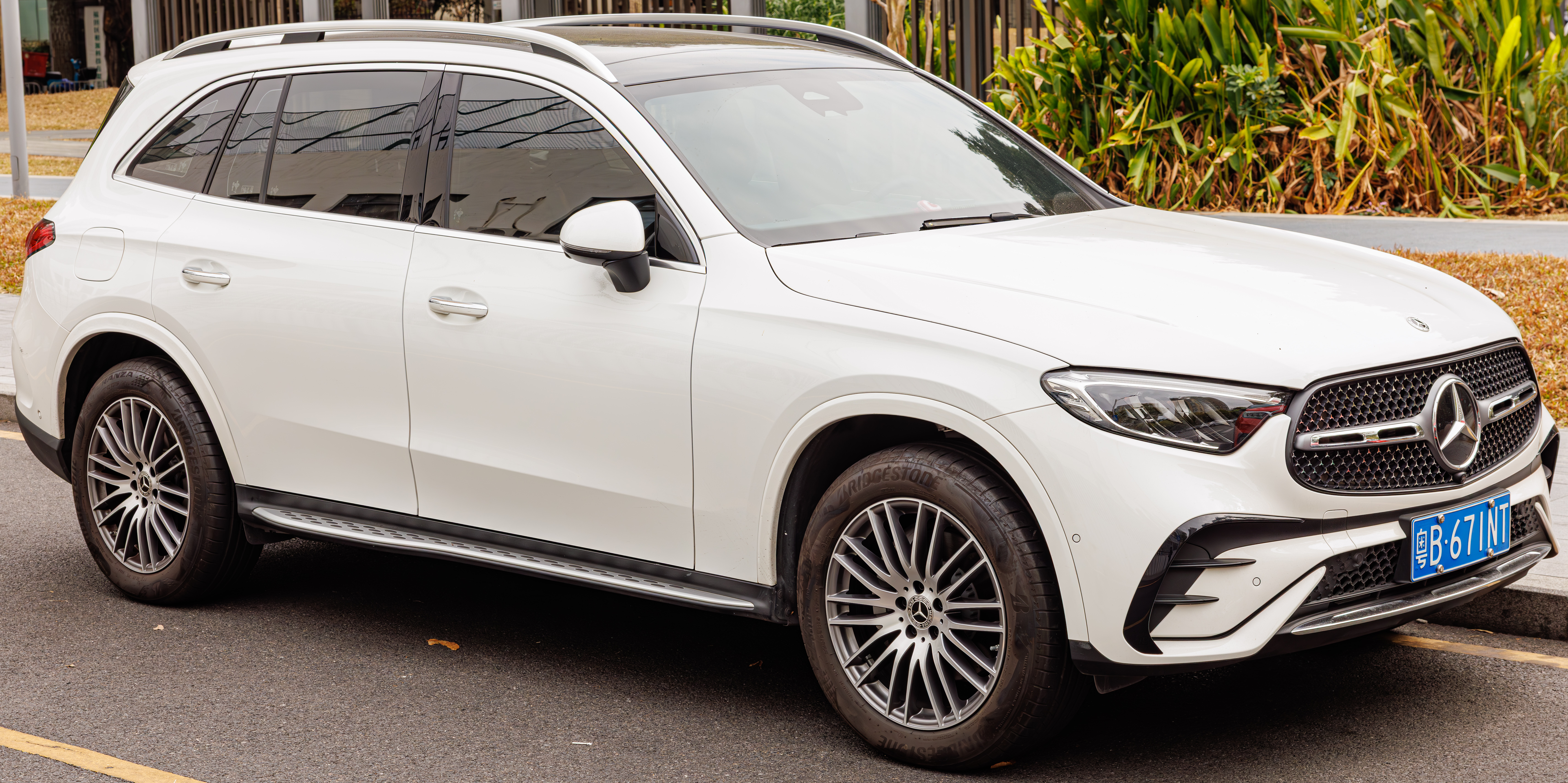
Mercedes-Benz GLC L (China)

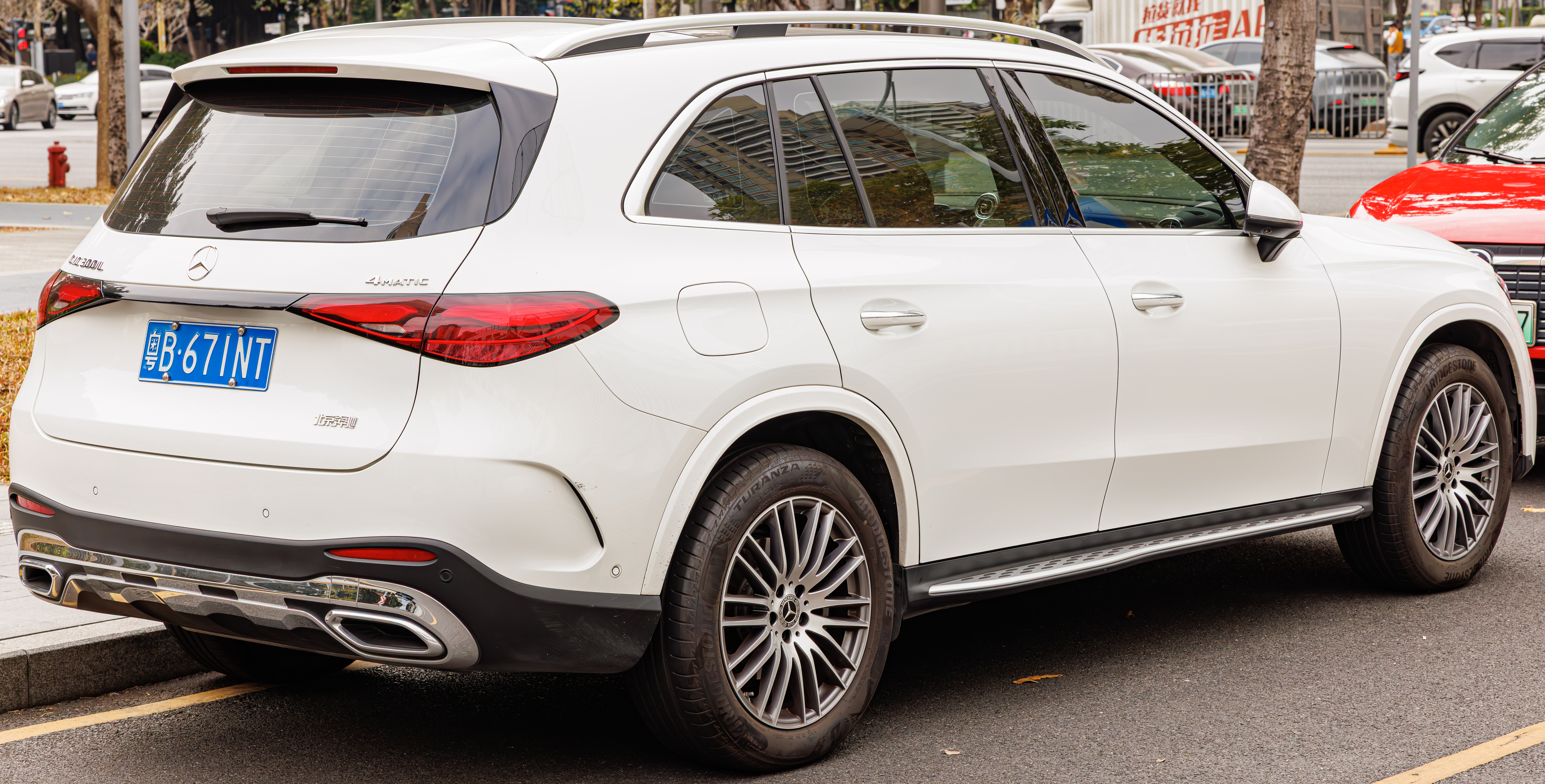
Mercedes-Benz GLC L (Rear view)

=== Powertrain ===
Engines
Type	Model	Engine code	Displacement	Power	Torque	Combined system output	Electric motor	Battery	Trans.	Top speed	0–100 km/h (0–62 mph)	Layout	Cal. years
Petrol mild hybrid	GLC 200	M 254	1,999 cc (2.0 L) I4	Engine: 204 hp (152 kW; 207 PS) @ 6,100 rpm Front motor: 23 hp (17 kW; 23 PS)	Engine: 320 N⋅m (32.6 kp⋅m; 236 lb⋅ft) @ 2,000-4,000 rpm Front motor: 200 N⋅m (20.4 kp⋅m; 148 lb⋅ft)		EQ Boost Mild Hybrid System		9-speed 9G-Tronic automatic	221 km/h (137 mph)	7.8 s	AWD (4Matic)	
Petrol mild hybrid	GLC 200	M 254	1,999 cc (2.0 L) I4	Engine: 204 hp (152 kW; 207 PS) @ 6,100 rpm Front motor: 23 hp (17 kW; 23 PS)	Engine: 320 N⋅m (32.6 kp⋅m; 236 lb⋅ft) @ 2,000-4,000 rpm Front motor: 200 N⋅m (20.4 kp⋅m; 148 lb⋅ft)		EQ Boost Mild Hybrid System		9-speed 9G-Tronic automatic	221 km/h (137 mph)	7.8 s	AWD (4Matic)	2022-present
Petrol mild hybrid	GLC 300	M 254	1,999 cc (2.0 L) I4	Engine: 258 hp (192 kW; 262 PS) @ 5,800 rpm Front motor: 23 hp (17 kW; 23 PS)	Engine: 400 N⋅m (40.8 kp⋅m; 295 lb⋅ft) @ 2,000-3,200 rpm Front motor: 200 N⋅m (20.4 kp⋅m; 148 lb⋅ft)		EQ Boost Mild Hybrid System		9-speed 9G-Tronic automatic	240 km/h (150 mph)	6.2 s	RWD; AWD (4Matic)	
Petrol mild hybrid	GLC 300	M 254	1,999 cc (2.0 L) I4	Engine: 258 hp (192 kW; 262 PS) @ 5,800 rpm Front motor: 23 hp (17 kW; 23 PS)	Engine: 400 N⋅m (40.8 kp⋅m; 295 lb⋅ft) @ 2,000-3,200 rpm Front motor: 200 N⋅m (20.4 kp⋅m; 148 lb⋅ft)		EQ Boost Mild Hybrid System		9-speed 9G-Tronic automatic	240 km/h (150 mph)	6.2 s	RWD; AWD (4Matic)	2022-present
Diesel mild hybrid	GLC 200d	OM 654	1,993 cc (2.0 L) I4 turbo	Engine: 163 hp (122 kW; 165 PS) @ 3,200-4,400 rpm Front motor: 23 hp (17 kW; 23 PS)	Engine: 380 N⋅m (38.7 kp⋅m; 280 lb⋅ft) @ 1,600-2,800 rpm Front motor: 200 N⋅m (20.4 kp⋅m; 148 lb⋅ft)		EQ Boost Mild Hybrid System		9-speed 9G-Tronic automatic	208 km/h (129 mph)	8.9 s	AWD (4Matic)	
Diesel mild hybrid	GLC 200d	OM 654	1,993 cc (2.0 L) I4 turbo	Engine: 163 hp (122 kW; 165 PS) @ 3,200-4,400 rpm Front motor: 23 hp (17 kW; 23 PS)	Engine: 380 N⋅m (38.7 kp⋅m; 280 lb⋅ft) @ 1,600-2,800 rpm Front motor: 200 N⋅m (20.4 kp⋅m; 148 lb⋅ft)		EQ Boost Mild Hybrid System		9-speed 9G-Tronic automatic	208 km/h (129 mph)	8.9 s	AWD (4Matic)	2024-present
Diesel mild hybrid	GLC 220d	OM 654	1,993 cc (2.0 L) I4 turbo	Engine: 197 hp (147 kW; 200 PS) @ 3,600 rpm Front motor: 23 hp (17 kW; 23 PS)	Engine: 440 N⋅m (44.9 kp⋅m; 325 lb⋅ft) @ 2,000-3,200 rpm Front motor: 200 N⋅m (20.4 kp⋅m; 148 lb⋅ft)		EQ Boost Mild Hybrid System		9-speed 9G-Tronic automatic	219 km/h (136 mph)	8.0 s	AWD (4Matic)	
Diesel mild hybrid	GLC 220d	OM 654	1,993 cc (2.0 L) I4 turbo	Engine: 197 hp (147 kW; 200 PS) @ 3,600 rpm Front motor: 23 hp (17 kW; 23 PS)	Engine: 440 N⋅m (44.9 kp⋅m; 325 lb⋅ft) @ 2,000-3,200 rpm Front motor: 200 N⋅m (20.4 kp⋅m; 148 lb⋅ft)		EQ Boost Mild Hybrid System		9-speed 9G-Tronic automatic	219 km/h (136 mph)	8.0 s	AWD (4Matic)	2022-present
Diesel mild hybrid	GLC 300d	OM 654	1,993 cc (2.0 L) I4 turbo	Engine: 269 hp (201 kW; 273 PS) @ 4,200 rpm Front motor: 23 hp (17 kW; 23 PS)	Engine: 550 N⋅m (56.1 kp⋅m; 406 lb⋅ft) @ 1,800-2,200 rpm Front motor: 200 N⋅m (20.4 kp⋅m; 148 lb⋅ft)		EQ Boost Mild Hybrid System		9-speed 9G-Tronic automatic	243 km/h (151 mph)	6.3 s	AWD (4Matic)	
Diesel mild hybrid	GLC 300d	OM 654	1,993 cc (2.0 L) I4 turbo	Engine: 269 hp (201 kW; 273 PS) @ 4,200 rpm Front motor: 23 hp (17 kW; 23 PS)	Engine: 550 N⋅m (56.1 kp⋅m; 406 lb⋅ft) @ 1,800-2,200 rpm Front motor: 200 N⋅m (20.4 kp⋅m; 148 lb⋅ft)		EQ Boost Mild Hybrid System		9-speed 9G-Tronic automatic	243 km/h (151 mph)	6.3 s	AWD (4Matic)	2022-present
Diesel mild hybrid	GLC 450d	OM 656	2,989 cc (3.0 L) I6 turbo	Engine: 367 hp (274 kW; 372 PS) @ 4,000 rpm Front motor: 23 hp (17 kW; 23 PS)	Engine: 750 N⋅m (76.5 kp⋅m; 553 lb⋅ft) @ 1,350-2,800 rpm Front motor: 200 N⋅m (20.4 kp⋅m; 148 lb⋅ft)		EQ Boost Mild Hybrid System		9-speed 9G-Tronic automatic	250 km/h (160 mph)	4.7 s	AWD (4Matic)	
Diesel mild hybrid	GLC 450d	OM 656	2,989 cc (3.0 L) I6 turbo	Engine: 367 hp (274 kW; 372 PS) @ 4,000 rpm Front motor: 23 hp (17 kW; 23 PS)	Engine: 750 N⋅m (76.5 kp⋅m; 553 lb⋅ft) @ 1,350-2,800 rpm Front motor: 200 N⋅m (20.4 kp⋅m; 148 lb⋅ft)		EQ Boost Mild Hybrid System		9-speed 9G-Tronic automatic	250 km/h (160 mph)	4.7 s	AWD (4Matic)	2023-present
Petrol plug-in hybrid	GLC 300e /GLC 350e	M 254	1,999 cc (2.0 L) I4 turbo	Engine: 204 hp (152 kW; 207 PS) @ 6,100 rpm Front motor: 136 hp (101 kW; 138 PS)	Engine: 320 N⋅m (32.6 kp⋅m; 236 lb⋅ft) @ 2,000-3,200 rpm Front motor: 440 N⋅m (44.9 kp⋅m; 325 lb⋅ft)	Power: 313 hp (233 kW; 317 PS) Torque: 550 N⋅m (56.1 kp⋅m; 406 lb⋅ft)	Permanent magnet synchronous	31.2 kW⋅h lithium-ion	9-speed 9G-Tronic automatic	218 km/h (135 mph)	6.7 s	AWD (4Matic)	
Petrol plug-in hybrid	GLC 300e /GLC 350e	M 254	1,999 cc (2.0 L) I4 turbo	Engine: 204 hp (152 kW; 207 PS) @ 6,100 rpm Front motor: 136 hp (101 kW; 138 PS)	Engine: 320 N⋅m (32.6 kp⋅m; 236 lb⋅ft) @ 2,000-3,200 rpm Front motor: 440 N⋅m (44.9 kp⋅m; 325 lb⋅ft)	Power: 313 hp (233 kW; 317 PS) Torque: 550 N⋅m (56.1 kp⋅m; 406 lb⋅ft)	Permanent magnet synchronous	31.2 kW⋅h lithium-ion	9-speed 9G-Tronic automatic	218 km/h (135 mph)	6.7 s	AWD (4Matic)	2022-present
Petrol plug-in hybrid	GLC 400e	M 254	1,999 cc (2.0 L) I4 turbo	Engine: 252 hp (188 kW; 255 PS) @ 5,800 rpm Front motor: 136 hp (101 kW; 138 PS)	Engine: 400 N⋅m (40.8 kp⋅m; 295 lb⋅ft) @ 2,000-3,200 rpm Front motor: 440 N⋅m (44.9 kp⋅m; 325 lb⋅ft)	Power: 381 hp (284 kW; 386 PS) Torque: 650 N⋅m (66.3 kp⋅m; 479 lb⋅ft)	Permanent magnet synchronous	31.2 kW⋅h lithium-ion	9-speed 9G-Tronic automatic	237 km/h (147 mph)	5.6 s	AWD (4Matic)	
Petrol plug-in hybrid	GLC 400e	M 254	1,999 cc (2.0 L) I4 turbo	Engine: 252 hp (188 kW; 255 PS) @ 5,800 rpm Front motor: 136 hp (101 kW; 138 PS)	Engine: 400 N⋅m (40.8 kp⋅m; 295 lb⋅ft) @ 2,000-3,200 rpm Front motor: 440 N⋅m (44.9 kp⋅m; 325 lb⋅ft)	Power: 381 hp (284 kW; 386 PS) Torque: 650 N⋅m (66.3 kp⋅m; 479 lb⋅ft)	Permanent magnet synchronous	31.2 kW⋅h lithium-ion	9-speed 9G-Tronic automatic	237 km/h (147 mph)	5.6 s	AWD (4Matic)	2022-present
Diesel plug-in hybrid	GLC 300de	OM 654	1,993 cc (2.0 L) I4 turbo	Engine: 269 hp (201 kW; 273 PS) @ 3,600 rpm Front motor: 136 hp (101 kW; 138 PS)	Engine: 440 N⋅m (44.9 kp⋅m; 325 lb⋅ft) @ 1,800-2,800 rpm Front motor: 440 N⋅m (44.9 kp⋅m; 325 lb⋅ft)	Power: 335 hp (250 kW; 340 PS) Torque: 750 N⋅m (76.5 kp⋅m; 553 lb⋅ft)	Permanent magnet synchronous	31.2 kW⋅h lithium-ion	9-speed 9G-Tronic automatic	217 km/h (135 mph)	6.4 s	AWD (4Matic)	
Diesel plug-in hybrid	GLC 300de	OM 654	1,993 cc (2.0 L) I4 turbo	Engine: 269 hp (201 kW; 273 PS) @ 3,600 rpm Front motor: 136 hp (101 kW; 138 PS)	Engine: 440 N⋅m (44.9 kp⋅m; 325 lb⋅ft) @ 1,800-2,800 rpm Front motor: 440 N⋅m (44.9 kp⋅m; 325 lb⋅ft)	Power: 335 hp (250 kW; 340 PS) Torque: 750 N⋅m (76.5 kp⋅m; 553 lb⋅ft)	Permanent magnet synchronous	31.2 kW⋅h lithium-ion	9-speed 9G-Tronic automatic	217 km/h (135 mph)	6.4 s	AWD (4Matic)	2022-present
AMG engines
Petrol mild hybrid	GLC 43	M 139	1,991 cc (2.0 L) I4	Engine: 416 hp (310 kW; 422 PS) @ 6,750 rpm Front motor: 14 hp (10 kW; 14 PS)	Engine: 500 N⋅m (51.0 kp⋅m; 369 lb⋅ft) @ 5,000 rpm Front motor: 200 N⋅m (20.4 kp⋅m; 148 lb⋅ft)		EQ Boost Mild Hybrid System	48 V battery	9-speed automatic MCT "Speedshift"	250 km/h (160 mph)	4.8 s	AWD (4Matic)	
Petrol mild hybrid	GLC 43	M 139	1,991 cc (2.0 L) I4	Engine: 416 hp (310 kW; 422 PS) @ 6,750 rpm Front motor: 14 hp (10 kW; 14 PS)	Engine: 500 N⋅m (51.0 kp⋅m; 369 lb⋅ft) @ 5,000 rpm Front motor: 200 N⋅m (20.4 kp⋅m; 148 lb⋅ft)		EQ Boost Mild Hybrid System	48 V battery	9-speed automatic MCT "Speedshift"	250 km/h (160 mph)	4.8 s	AWD (4Matic)	2023-present
Petrol plug-in hybrid	GLC 63	M 139	1,991 cc (2.0 L) I4	Engine: 469 hp (350 kW; 476 PS) @ 6,750 rpm Front motor: 201 hp (150 kW; 204 PS)	Engine: 545 N⋅m (55.6 kp⋅m; 402 lb⋅ft) @ 5,250-5,500 rpm Front motor: 440 N⋅m (44.9 kp⋅m; 325 lb⋅ft)	Power: 671 hp (500 kW; 680 PS) Torque: 1,020 N⋅m (104 kp⋅m; 752 lb⋅ft)	Permanent magnet synchronous	400 V, 6.1 kW⋅h lithium-ion	9-speed automatic MCT "Speedshift"	275 km/h (171 mph)	3.5 s	AWD (4Matic+)	
Petrol plug-in hybrid	GLC 63	M 139	1,991 cc (2.0 L) I4	Engine: 469 hp (350 kW; 476 PS) @ 6,750 rpm Front motor: 201 hp (150 kW; 204 PS)	Engine: 545 N⋅m (55.6 kp⋅m; 402 lb⋅ft) @ 5,250-5,500 rpm Front motor: 440 N⋅m (44.9 kp⋅m; 325 lb⋅ft)	Power: 671 hp (500 kW; 680 PS) Torque: 1,020 N⋅m (104 kp⋅m; 752 lb⋅ft)	Permanent magnet synchronous	400 V, 6.1 kW⋅h lithium-ion	9-speed automatic MCT "Speedshift"	275 km/h (171 mph)	3.5 s	AWD (4Matic+)	2023-present

=== Safety ===
==== ANCAP ====
ANCAP test results Mercedes-Benz GLC (2022, aligned with Euro NCAP)
Test	Points	%
Overall:	5 /5 stars	
Adult occupant:	35.20	92%
Child occupant:	45.39	92%
Pedestrian:	40.41	74%
Safety assist:	13.57	84%

==== Euro NCAP ====
Euro NCAP test results Mercedes-Benz GLC 220d 4MATIC AMG Line (LHD) (2022)
Test	Points	%
Overall:	5 /5 stars	
Adult occupant:	35.2	92%
Child occupant:	44.4	90%
Pedestrian:	40.4	74%
Safety assist:	13.5	84%

==== IIHS ====
IIHS scores (2024 model year)
Small overlap front	Good
Moderate overlap front (original test)	Good
Moderate overlap front (updated test)	Good
Side (updated test)	Good
Headlights	Good
Front crash prevention: vehicle-to-pedestrian (standard system)	Acceptable
Front crash prevention: vehicle-to-pedestrian (optional system)	Superior
Seatbelt reminders	Good
Child seat anchors (LATCH) ease of use	Good+

==== TNCAP ====
TNCAP (2026, 2.0 test result Mercedes-Benz GLC 200 4MATIC (similar to Euro NCAP 2022)
Test	Points	%
Overall:	5 /5 stars	
Adult occupant:	36.448	95%
Child occupant:	45.665	93%
Pedestrian:	34.24	71%
Safety assist:	11.5	76%

== Battery electric (X540; 2025) ==
The battery electric version, marketed as Mercedes-Benz GLC with EQ Technology, or alternatively "electric GLC", was unveiled at the 2025 Munich Motor Show. It is offered in a sole variant, GLC 400 4Matic.

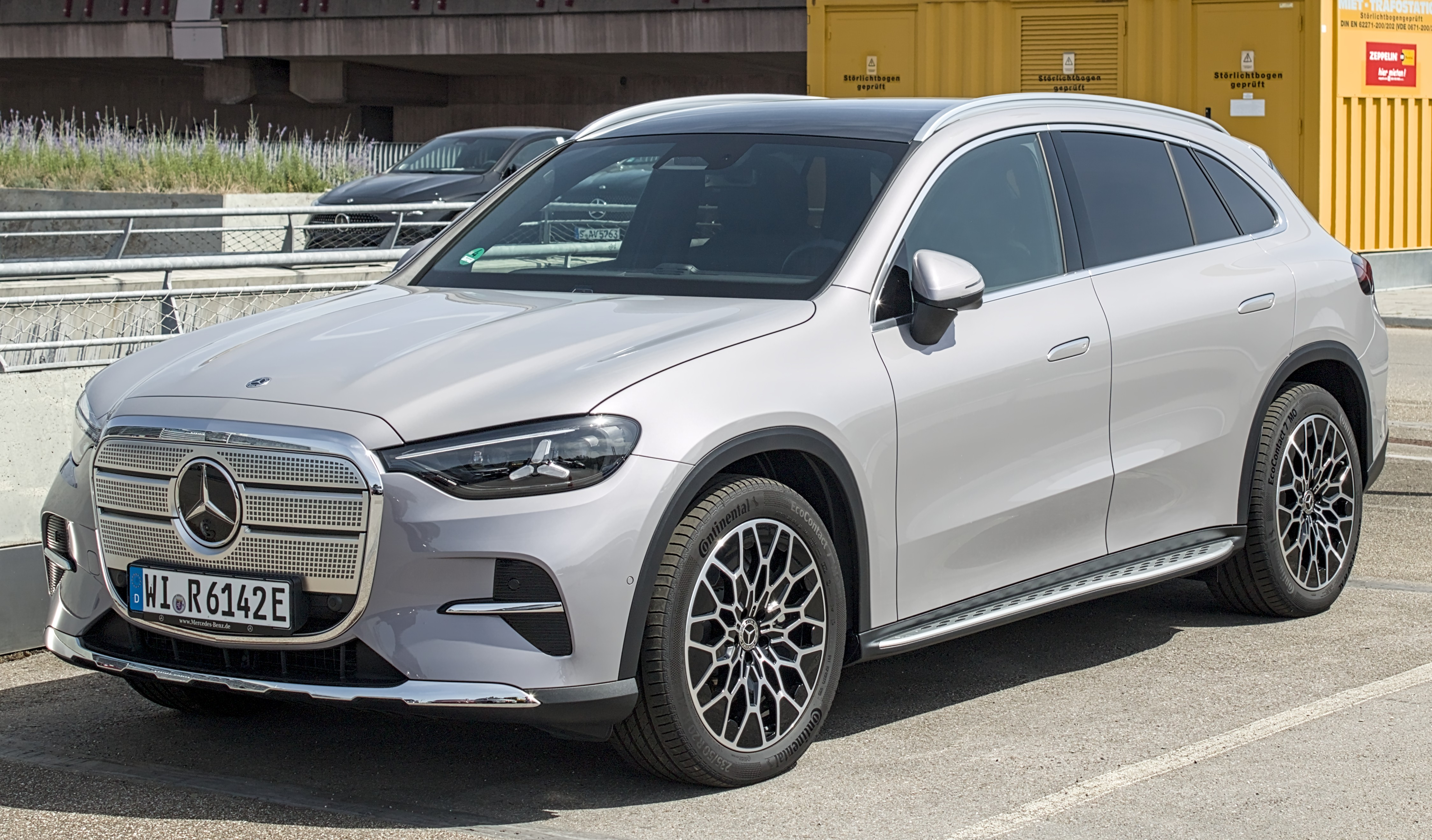
GLC with EQ Technology

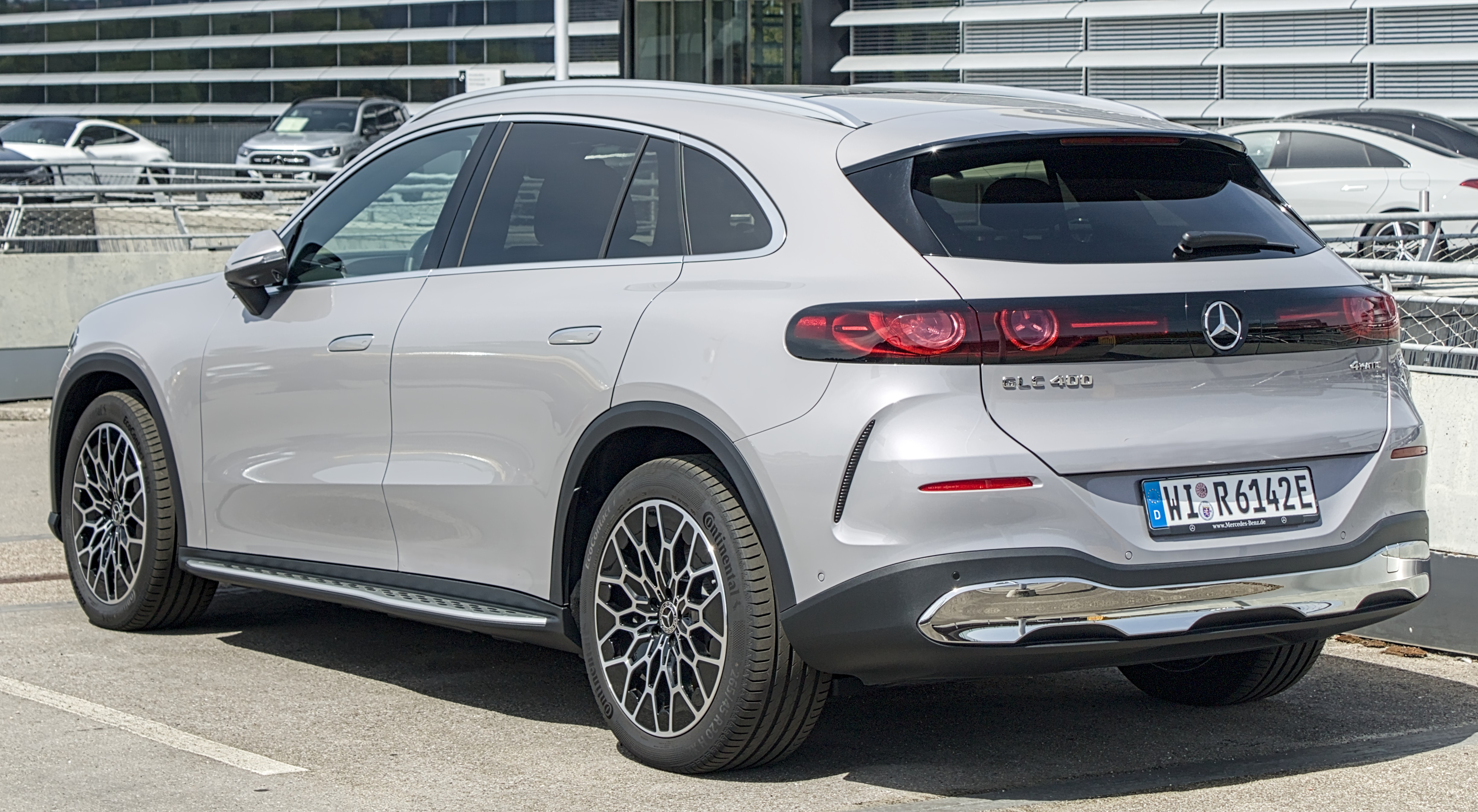
Rear view

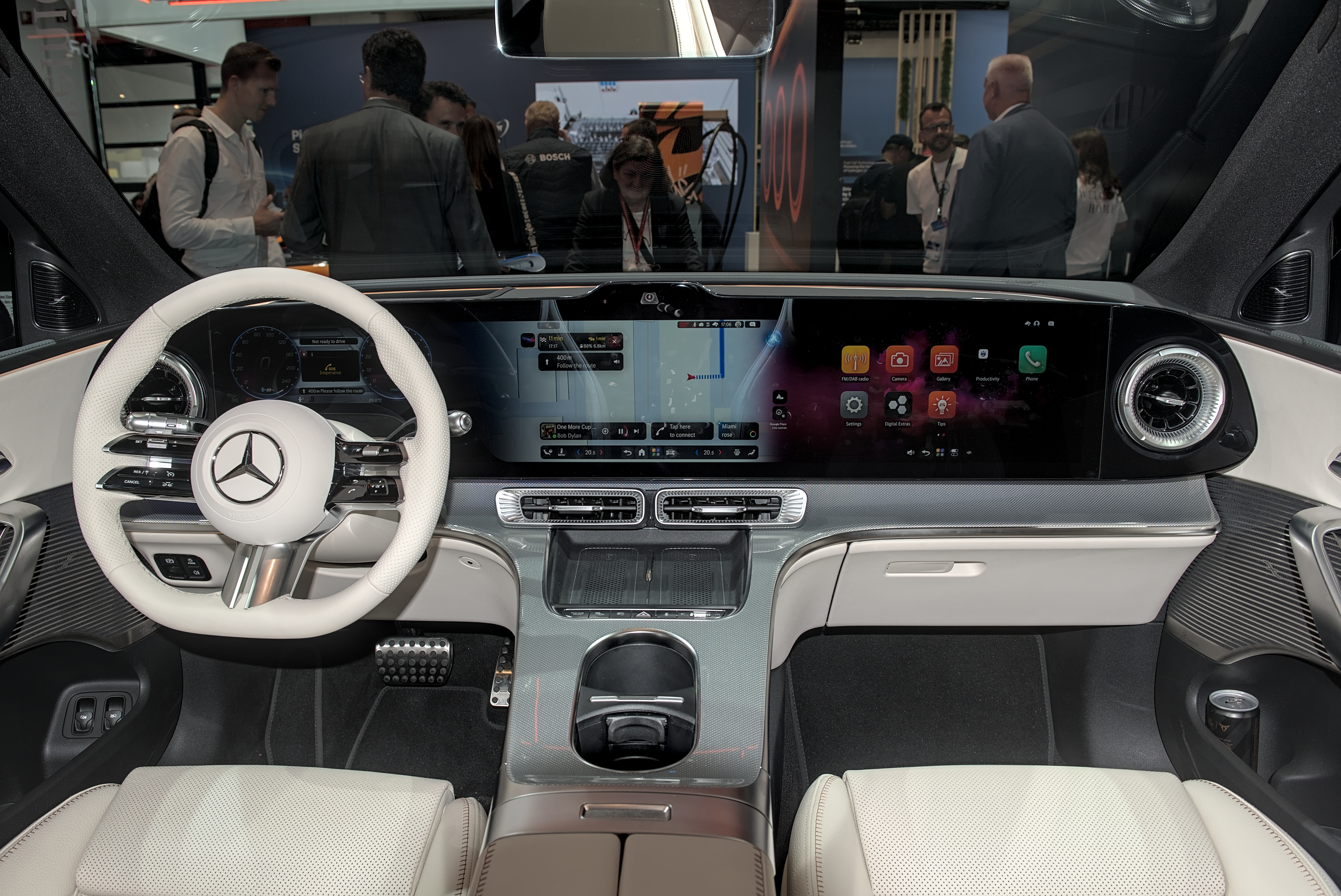
Interior

== Sales ==
Year	Europe	U.S.	Mexico	China			
Year	Europe	U.S.	Mexico	GLC	Coupe	PHEV	Total
2015	17,708	4,569	1,046				
2016	70,349	47,788	1,263				
2017	111,193	48,643	3,603				
2018	125,143	69,729	5,295				
2019	109,095	73,655	5,275				
2020	99,160	33,987	3,107				
2021	74,949	51,805	N/A				
2022	68,118	65,531	N/A				
2023	N/A	40,250	N/A	107,160	7,022	—	114,182
2024				150,887	2,460	12	153,359
2025				125,833	5,587	1,828	133,248
