= EQE =

EQE may refer to:

- External quantum efficiency
- European qualifying examination, a multi-day examination to become a European patent attorney
- Mercedes-Benz EQE, an electric sedan
- Mercedes-Benz EQE SUV, an electric sport utility vehicle

== See also ==
- Eqe Bay, Nunavut, Canada
