= List of Mercedes-EQ vehicles =

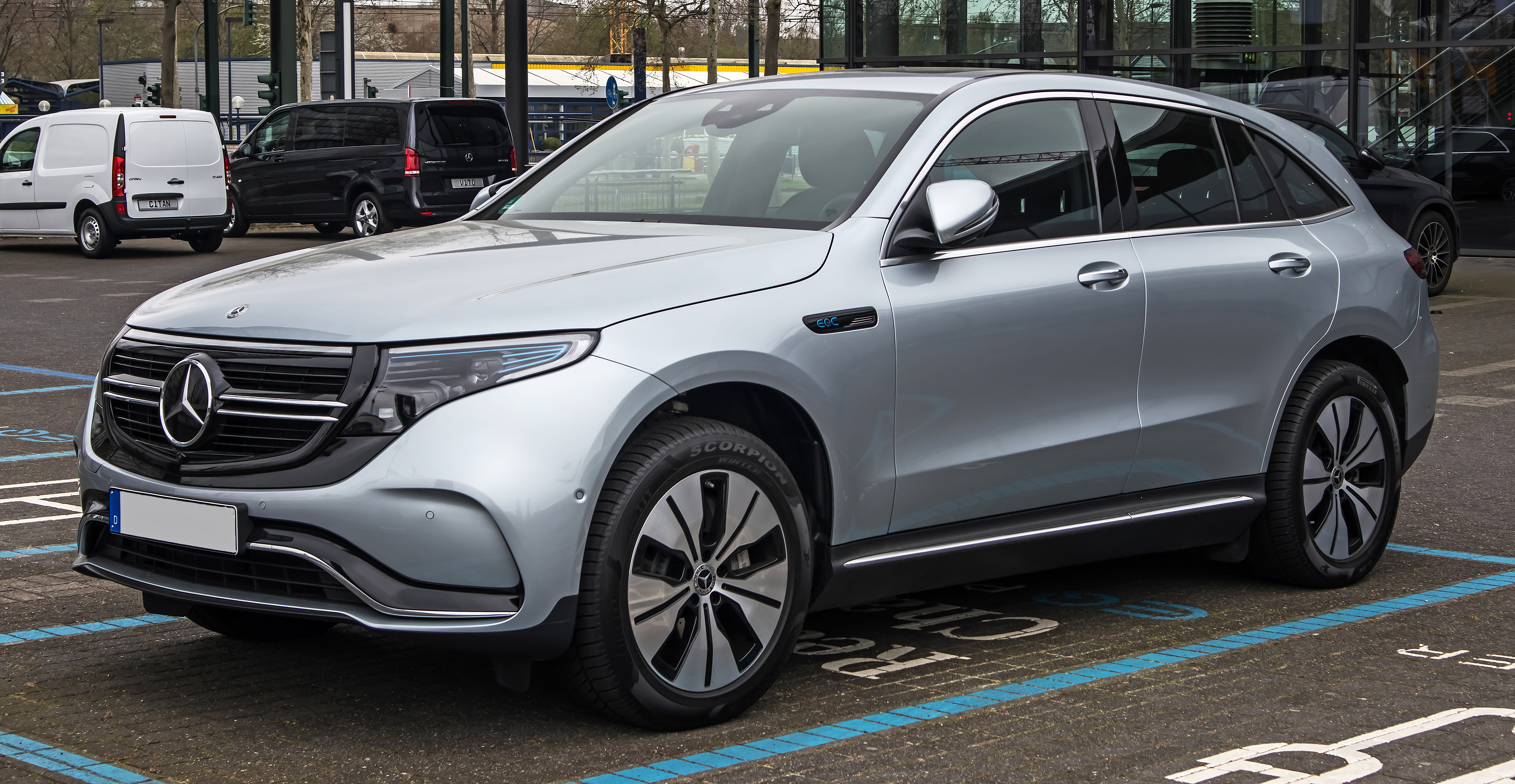
The EQC, a crossover SUV, was the first Mercedes-EQ vehicle.

The German carmaker Mercedes-Benz entered the battery electric vehicle market with the unveiling of the Generation EQ concept car at the 2016 Paris Motor Show. At the same show, Mercedes-Benz also announced the creation of a sub-brand called Mercedes-EQ.

Mercedes-Benz debuted the EQA concept at the 2017 International Motor Show Germany. The production version of the Generation EQ concept, and the first car in the Mercedes-EQ series, debuted publicly at the 2018 Paris Motor Show in the form of the EQC. Mercedes-Benz unveiled the EQV at the Geneva Motor Show in 2018. The carmaker revealed the Vision EQS, a large luxury concept saloon, at the 2019 edition of the International Motor Show Germany. In 2021, Mercedes-Benz debuted a series of vehicles: the production version of the EQA, a subcompact luxury crossover SUV, on 25 January; the production version of the EQS on 15 April; the EQB, a compact luxury crossover SUV, on 18 April; the EQE, an executive saloon, on 5 September; and the EQG—an electrified concept car version of the G-Class—also on 5 September.

Mercedes-Benz introduced the EQS SUV and the EQE SUV on 19 April 2022 and 16 October 2022, respectively. An electrified version of the T-Class van, called the "EQT", was revealed online as a concept car in May 2021, with the production model debuting in December 2022. As well as the production vehicles, Mercedes-Benz has also produced several concept cars, including the EQXX and the EQ Silver Arrow.

== Vehicles ==
=== Production vehicles ===
Production vehicles
Body style	Model				Ref.
Body style	Name	Image	Introduction (year)	Discontinuation (year)	Ref.
Compact luxury crossover SUV	EQC	Front three-quarters view of a white crossover SUV	2019	2023	
Minivan	EQV	Front three-quarters view of a silver minivan	2020	2026	
Subcompact luxury crossover SUV	EQA	Front three-quarters view of a grey crossover SUV	2021	2026	
Compact luxury crossover SUV	EQB	Front three-quarters view of a white crossover SUV	2021	2026	
Full-size luxury car	EQS	Front three-quarters view of a white saloon	2021	in production	
Executive car	EQE	Front three-quarters view of a white saloon	2021	in production	
Full-size luxury crossover SUV	EQS SUV	Front three-quarters view of a large crossover SUV	2022	in production	
Mid-size luxury crossover SUV	EQE SUV	Front three-quarters view of a mid-sized crossover SUV	2022	in production	
Minivan	EQT	Front three-quarters view of a brown minivan	2023	2026	

=== Concept vehicles ===
Concept vehicles
Model			Ref.
Name	Image	Introduction (year)	Ref.
Generation EQ	Inside front three-quarters view of a silver crossover	2016	
EQA	Inside front three-quarters view of a silver hatchback	2017	
Vision EQ Silver Arrow	Inside front three-quarters view of a grey race car	2018	
Vision EQS	Inside front three-quarters view of a two-tone luxury saloon	2019	
Concept EQT	Front three-quarters view of a black compact van	2021	
EQG	Front three-quarters view of a silver boxy SUV	2021	
Vision EQXX	Front three-quarters view of a silver concept car	2022	
