= Mercedes-Benz EQS SUV =

Battery electric luxury SUV

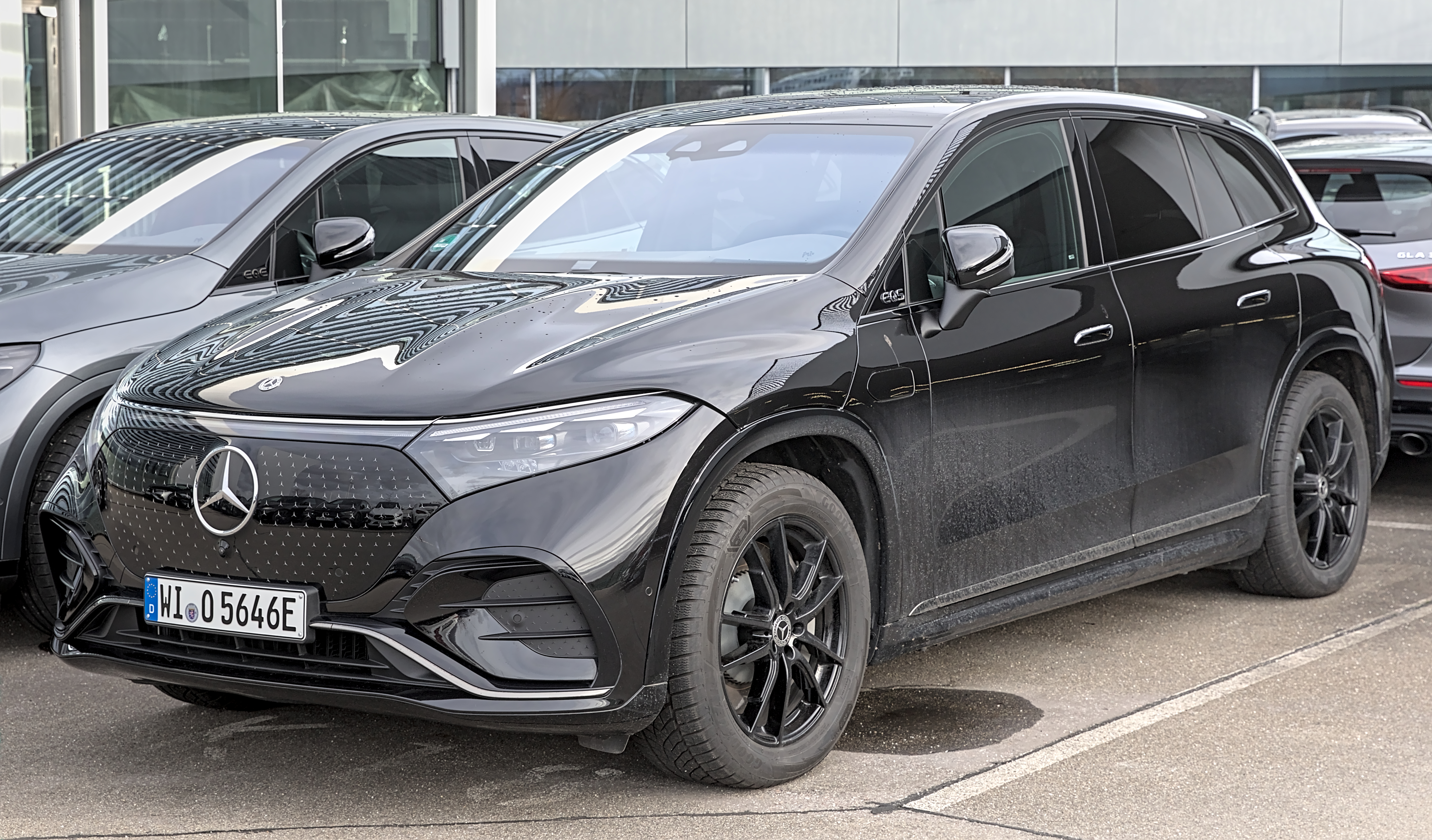

Overview
- Manufacturer: Mercedes-Benz Group
- Model code: X296
- Production: 2022–present
- Model years: 2023–present
- Assembly: United States: Tuscaloosa, Alabama (MBUSI); Thailand: Samut Prakan (TAAP)
- Designer: Lukas Haag, Slavche Tanevski

Body and chassis
- Class: Full-size luxury crossover SUV
- Body style: 5-door SUV
- Layout: Rear-motor, rear-wheel-drive; Dual-motor, all-wheel-drive (4Matic)
- Platform: Mercedes-Benz EVA platform
- Related: Mercedes-Benz EQS; Mercedes-Benz EQE SUV; Mercedes-Benz EQE

Powertrain
- Electric motor: Permanently excited synchronous motor
- Power output: 265 kW (360 PS; 355 hp) (EQS 450); 400 kW (544 PS; 536 hp) (EQS 580 4MATIC)
- Transmission: 1-speed direct-drive
- Battery: 107.8 kWh lithium-ion
- Electric range: 660 km (410 mi) (WLTP)
- Plug-in charging: Three-phase 9.6 kW (AC); 200 kW (DC)

Dimensions
- Wheelbase: 3,210 mm (126.4 in)
- Length: 5,125 mm (201.8 in)
- Width: 1,959 mm (77.1 in)
- Height: 1,718 mm (67.6 in)
- Curb weight: 2,480–2,735 kg (5,467–6,030 lb)

The Mercedes-Benz EQS SUV is a battery electric full-size luxury crossover SUV produced by the German automobile manufacturer Mercedes-Benz Group. Part of the EQ range and the SUV counterpart of the EQS liftback, it is positioned as the battery electric version of the GLS. It is the third model built on the dedicated Electric Vehicle Architecture, following the EQS and the EQE sedan. The model also offers optional third-row seating.

== Overview ==
The vehicle was unveiled on 19 April 2022. Three versions are offered, which are EQS 450+, EQS 450 4MATIC, and EQS 580 4MATIC. The rear-wheel drive EQS 450+'s motor has a peak power output of 265 kW (360 PS; 355 hp) and produces 568 N⋅m (419 lb⋅ft) of peak torque, which increases to 800 N⋅m (590 lb⋅ft) for the dual-motor all-wheel drive 450 4MATIC. The EQS 580 SUV is powered by more powerful dual motors which produce a combined power of up to 400 kW (544 PS; 536 hp) and deliver a peak torque of 858 N⋅m (633 lb⋅ft).

The vehicle features a 56-inch wide glass dashboard with an array of displays, marketed as the MBUX Hyperscreen. It consists of a 12.3-inch instrument cluster, 17.7-inch OLED infotainment screen, and 12.3-inch OLED passenger entertainment display. The headroom in the first and second row of seats with sliding sunroof is 1,034 mm (40.7 in).

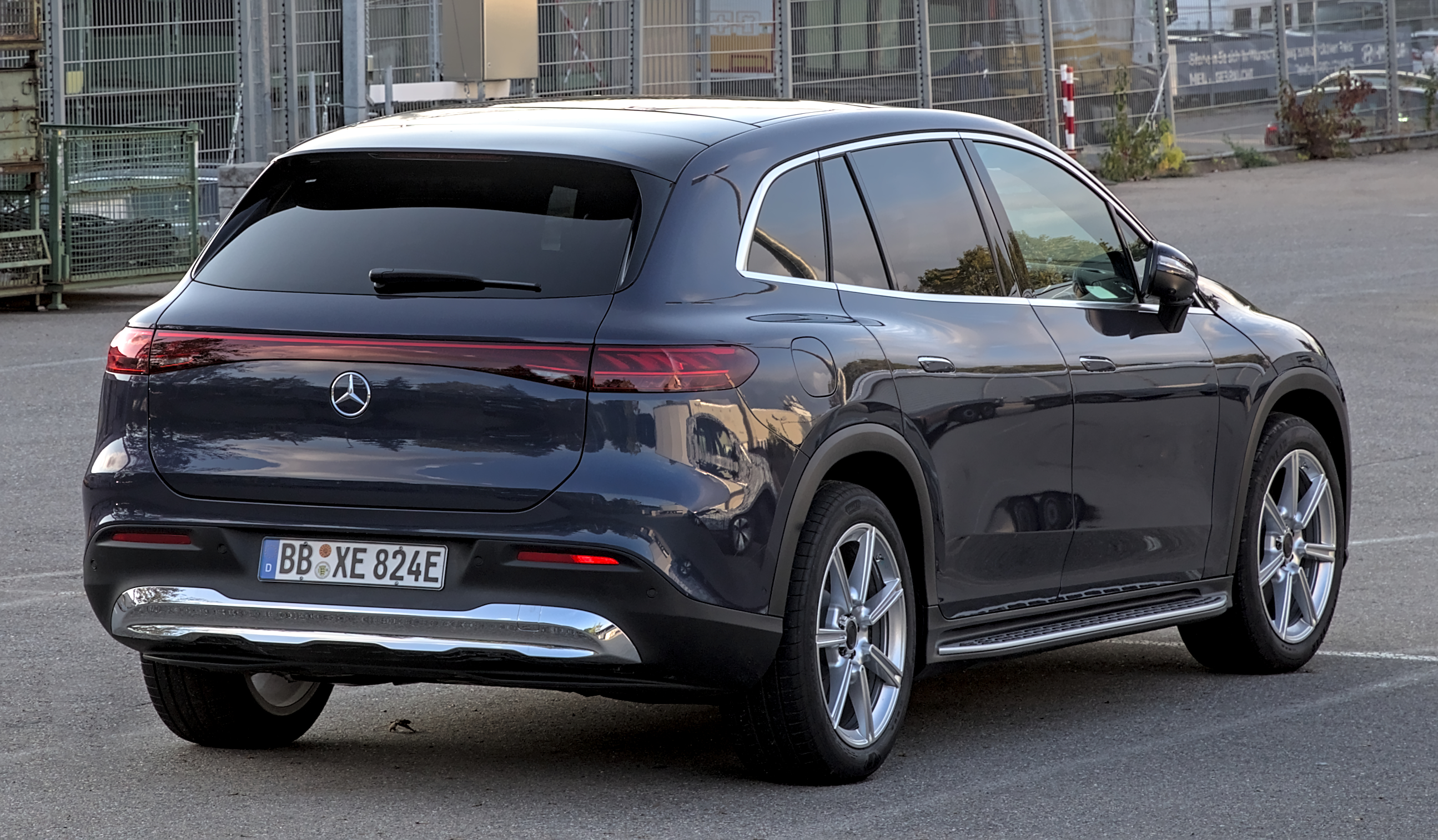
Rear view

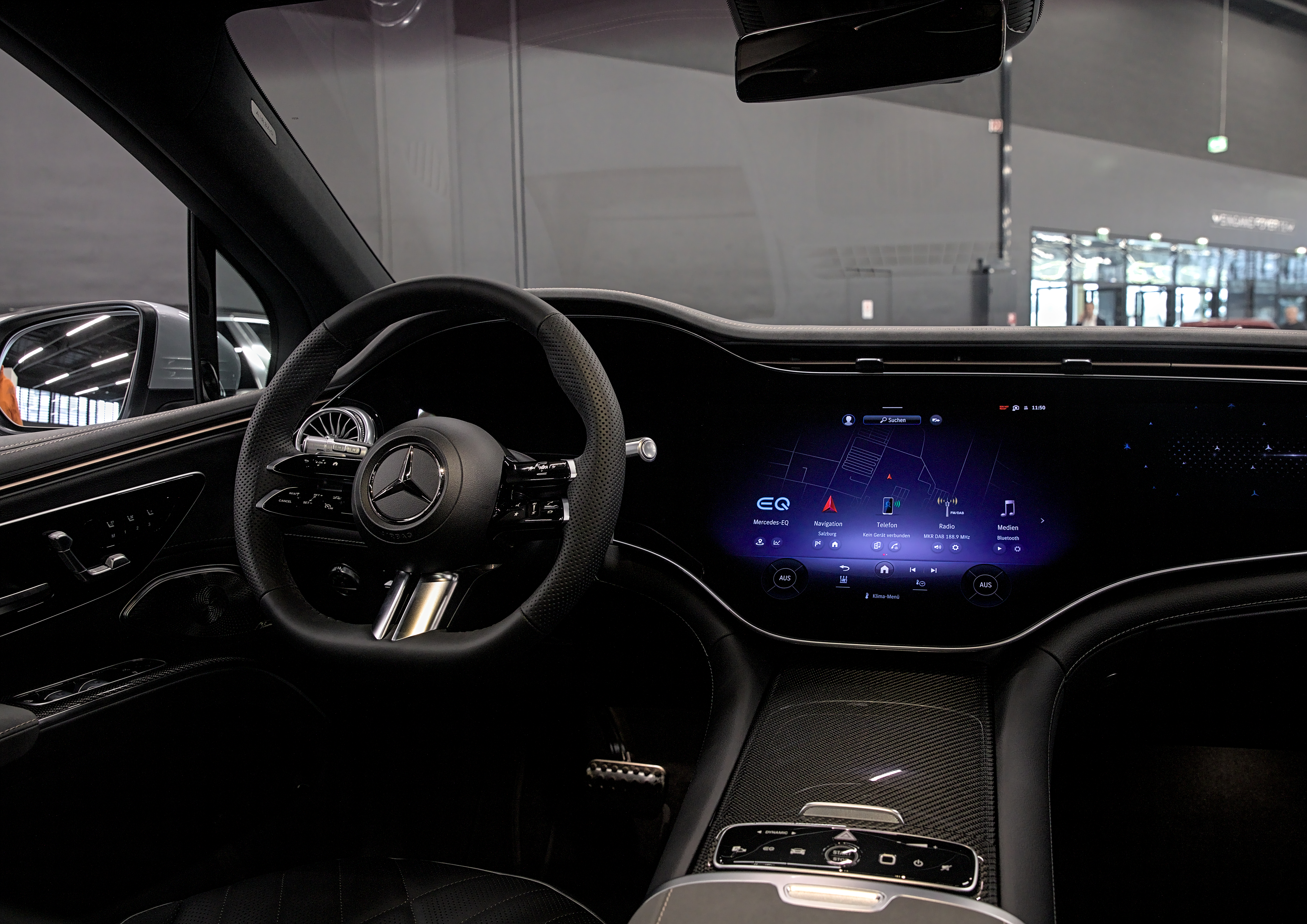
Interior

== Maybach EQS 680 ==
In April 2023, Mercedes unveiled the Mercedes-Maybach EQS 680 SUV, an ultra-luxury variant of the EQS SUV under the Maybach sub-brand.

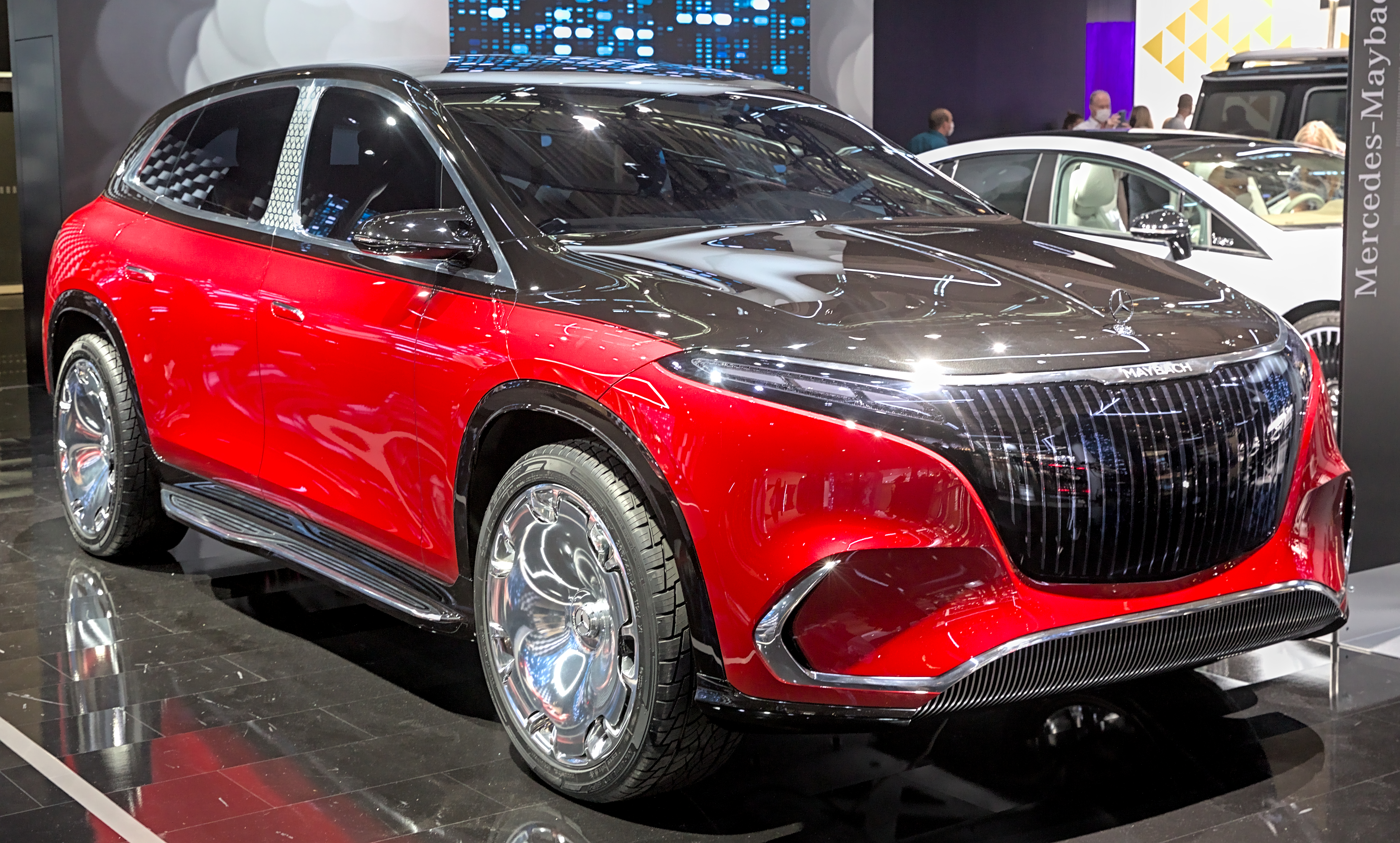
Mercedes-Maybach Concept EQS

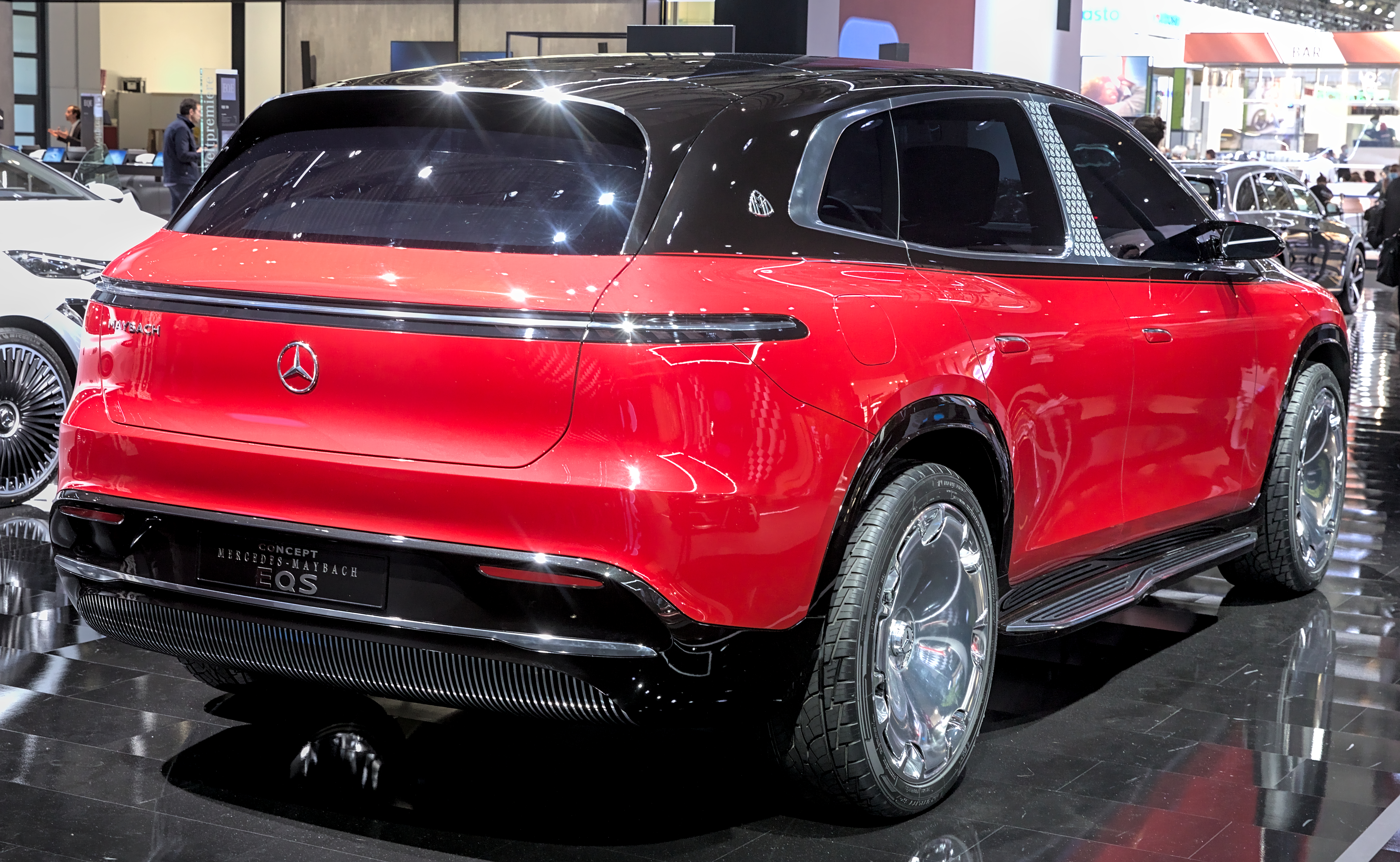
Rear view (Concept EQS)

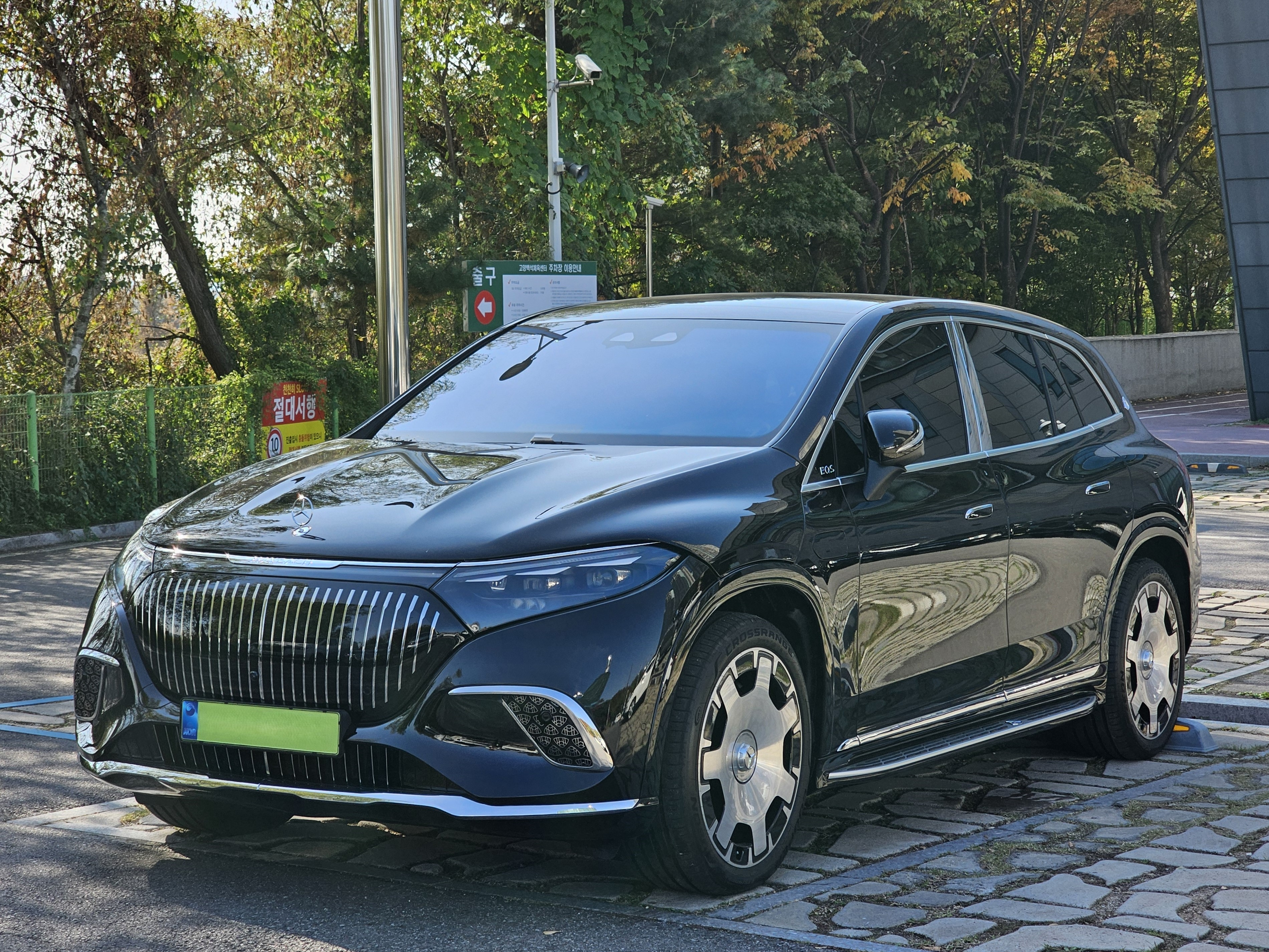
Mercedes-Maybach EQS SUV

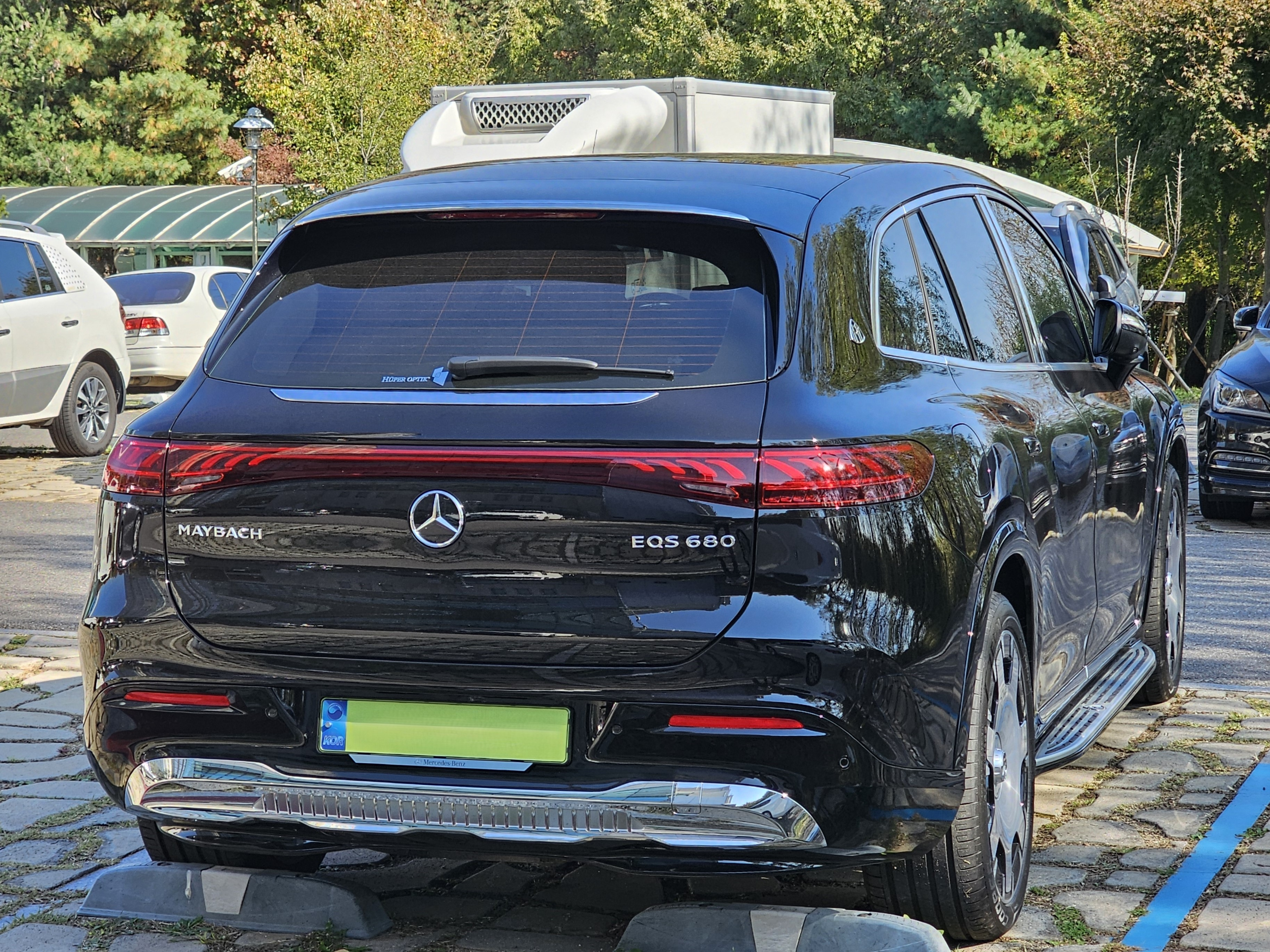
Rear view

== Models ==
The specifications include:

Model	Years	Power	Torque	Battery Capacity full/usable [kWh]	Drivetrain	0–100 km/h (0–62 mph)	Top speed	Max. Range (WLTP)	Range (EPA)
EQS 450+ SUV	2022–	265 kW (360 PS; 355 hp)	568 N⋅m (419 lb⋅ft)	120/107.8	RWD	6.7 s	210 km/h (130 mph)	660 km (410 mi)	305 mi (491 km)
EQS 450 4MATIC SUV	2022–	265 kW (360 PS; 355 hp)	800 N⋅m (590 lb⋅ft)	120/107.8	4WD	6 s	210 km/h (130 mph)	613 km (381 mi)	285 mi (459 km)
EQS 580 4MATIC SUV	2022–	400 kW (544 PS; 536 hp)	858 N⋅m (633 lb⋅ft)	120/107.8	4WD	4.6 s	210 km/h (130 mph)	613 km (381 mi)	285 mi (459 km)
EQS 680 Maybach 4MATIC SUV	2023–	491 kW (668 PS; 658 hp)	950 N⋅m (701 lb⋅ft)	120/107.8	4WD	4.4 s	210 km/h (130 mph)	600 km (373 mi)	

== Sales ==
Year	China	
Year	EQS SUV	Maybach
2023	490	—
2024	405	9
2025	543	5
