= Mercedes-Benz EQE SUV =

Battery electric mid-size luxury crossover SUV

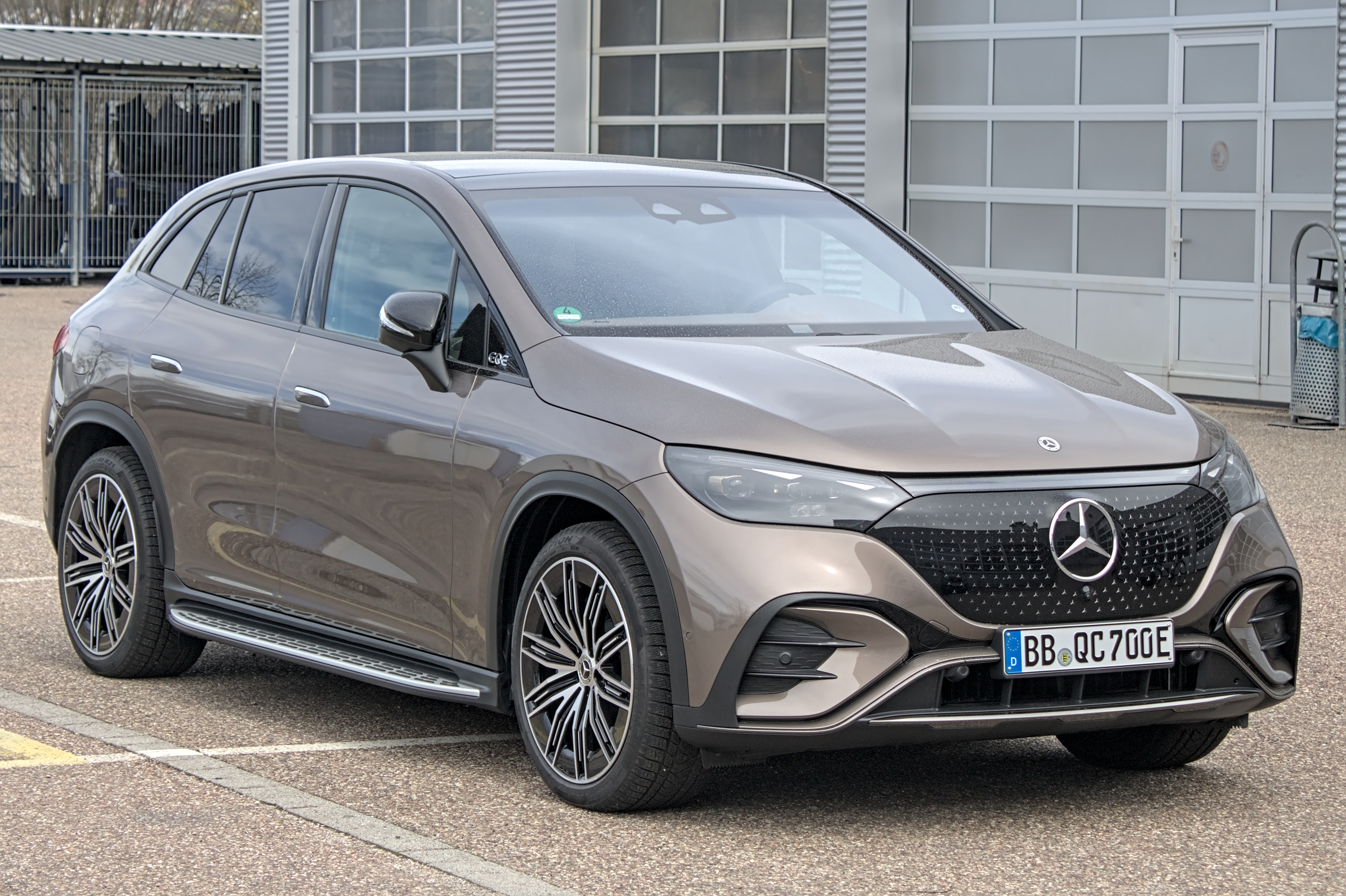
- 2023 Mercedes-Benz EQE 350 (Germany)

Overview
- Manufacturer: Mercedes-Benz Group
- Model code: X294
- Production: December 2022 – present
- Model years: 2023–present
- Assembly: United States: Tuscaloosa, Alabama (MBUSI); China: Beijing (Beijing Benz)
- Designer: Mayya Markova

Body and chassis
- Class: Mid-size luxury crossover SUV
- Body style: 5-door SUV
- Layout: Rear-motor, rear-wheel-drive; Dual-motor, all-wheel-drive
- Platform: Mercedes-Benz EVA platform
- Related: Mercedes-Benz EQE; Mercedes-Benz EQS; Mercedes-Benz EQS SUV

Powertrain
- Electric motor: Permanently excited synchronous motor
- Power output: 180–505 kW (241–677 hp)
- Transmission: Direct-drive automatic
- Battery: 90.6 kWh, 328 V lithium-ion
- Electric range: 375–590 km (233–367 mi)
- Plug-in charging: 11 kW (AC); 173 kW (DC)

Dimensions
- Wheelbase: 3,030 mm (119.3 in)
- Length: 4,863 mm (191.5 in)
- Width: 1,940 mm (76.4 in)
- Height: 1,680 mm (66.1 in)
- Kerb weight: 2,430–2,690 kg (5,357–5,930 lb)

The Mercedes-Benz EQE SUV is a battery electric mid-size luxury crossover SUV produced by German luxury brand Mercedes-Benz Group since December 2022. The vehicle was revealed on 16 October 2022, alongside the Mercedes-AMG performance variant. The automaker displayed the entire EQ range in the gardens of the Musée Rodin in Paris on 16 and 17 October, alongside concepts that will preview the company's electric future.

The SUV follows a similar design style to the rest of the vehicles in the EQ sub-brand. The vehicle is positioned between the D-segment EQC and F-segment EQS SUV in the EQ SUV lineup, and is essentially a sport utility variant of the EQE saloon. The EQE SUV is also the battery electric equivalent to the slightly larger Mercedes-Benz GLE.

== Overview ==
Internally designated X294, the vehicle is based on the newly-established EVA platform, which it shares with the EQE, EQS, and EQS SUV. Produced since December 2022, the vehicle is manufactured at the Mercedes-Benz U.S. International factory, akin to the Mercedes-Benz GLE and GLS ICE models. At 4,860 mm (191 in) long, it is about 60 mm (2.4 in) shorter than the GLE, its ICE counterpart. The vehicle was designed by exterior designer Mayya Markova.

Available in four models – the EQE 300, 350+, 350 4MATIC, and 500, as well as the AMG EQE 43 4MATIC performance variant, with a combined output of 350 kW (469 hp), a 50 kW (67 hp) increase over the standard EQE SUV 500. An even more powerful variant, the AMG EQE 53 4MATIC+, comes with AMG-specific motors and cooling elements that result in a power output of 460 kW (617 hp). All current models were launched in 2023. Additionally, all models feature a 328-volt, 90.6 kWh lithium-ion battery.

The model is a two-row, five seater vehicle. Rear-wheel drive is standard on base models, however all-wheel drive is optional on higher-end models which use the 4MATIC 4WD system. The AMG 53 model uses the 4MATIC+ system. The battery, consisting of 10 modules, are positioned below the floor. The EQE 500 had reached a drag coefficient of 0.25 C_{d}. The EQE SUV, as well as the EQS SUV, both run on a 400-volt battery architecture.

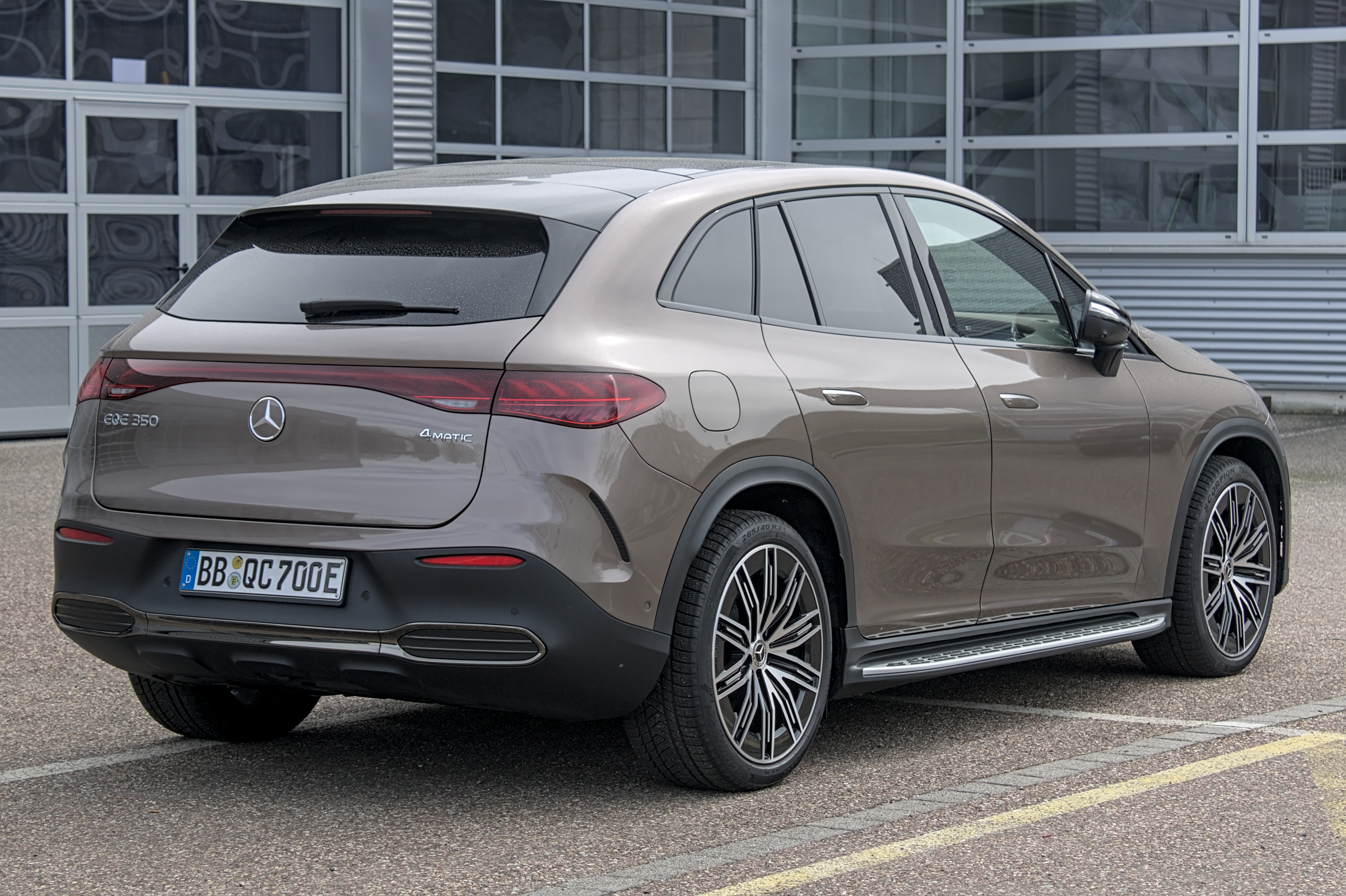
Rear view

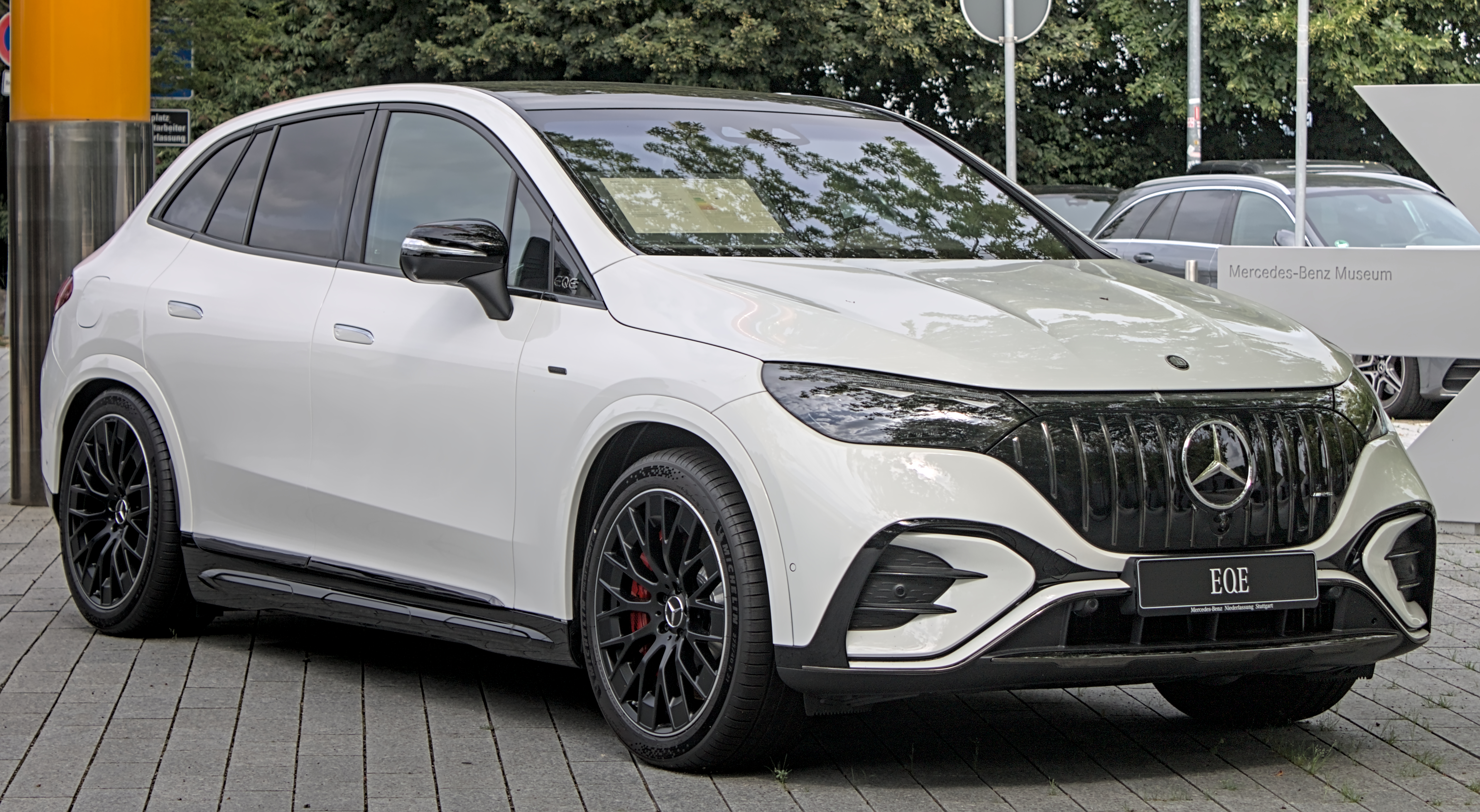
2024 Mercedes-AMG EQE 43 4MATIC (Germany)

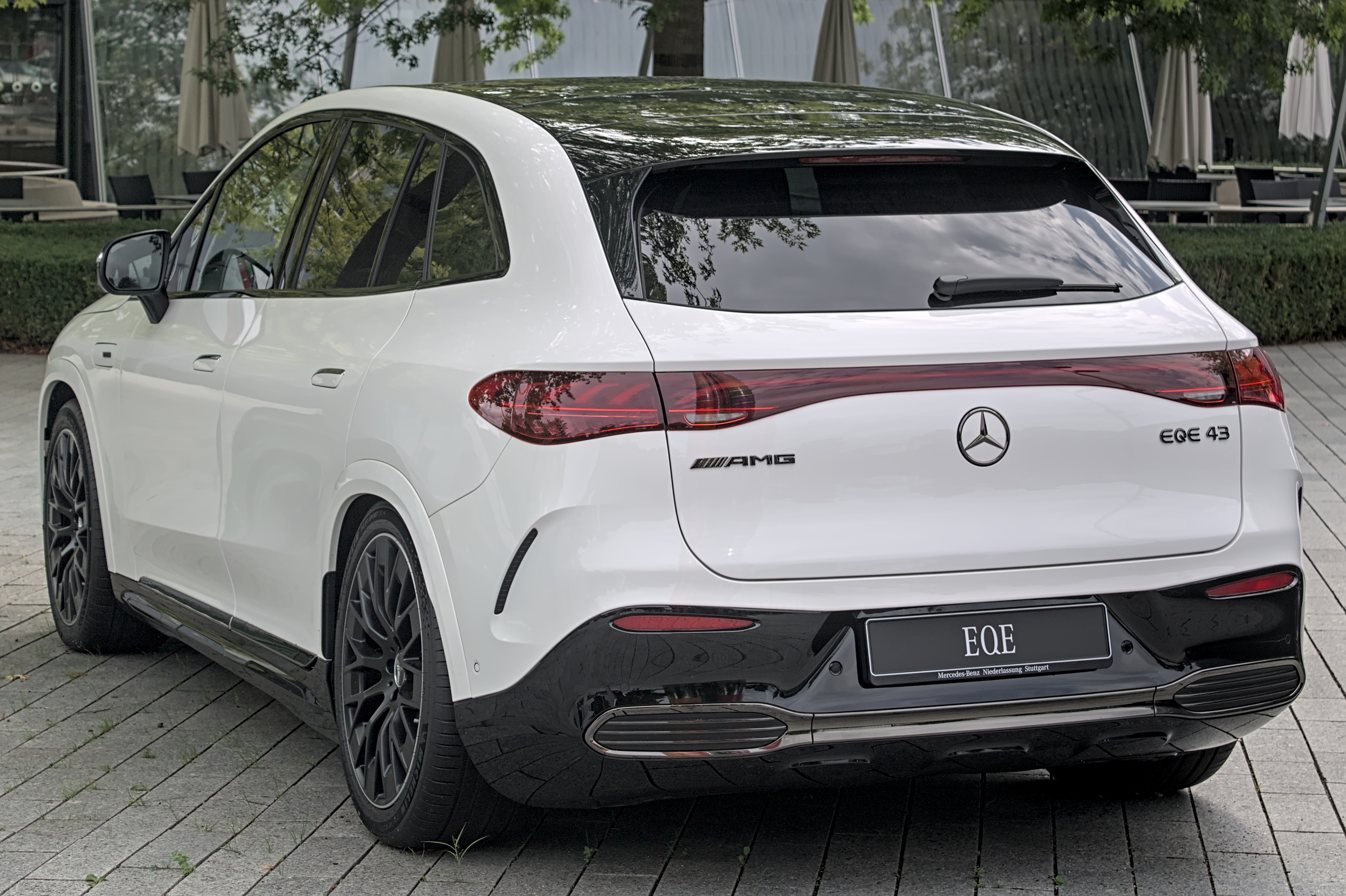
Rear view

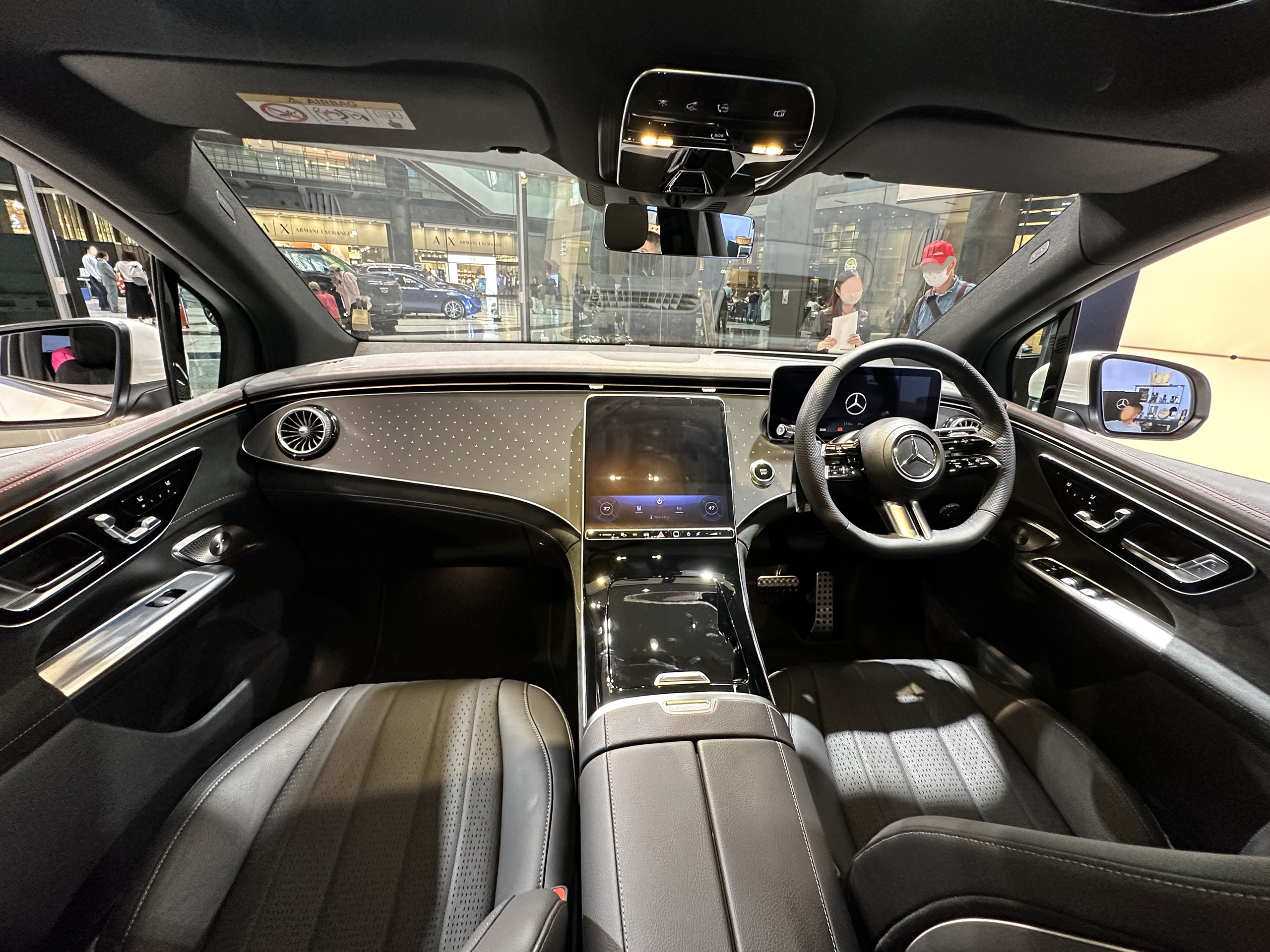
Interior

=== Features ===
The EQE SUV features a double wishbone suspension at the front with a multi-link setup and the rear. Rear axle steering with a maximum steering angle of 10 degrees is optional, along with wheel designs and sizes, ranging from 19- to 22-inch. All models are five-seaters and unlike the GLE, there is no third-row option. A large size 12.8-inch touchscreen runs the latest iteration of the newly-introduced MBUX software interface, which can now understand voice commands. The system also features over-the-air update capability that operates via an embedded SIM card. An extra 12.3-inch unit runs as a digital instrument panel, and a head-up display is available which features Mercedes's augmented-reality navigation system. CarPlay, Android Auto, SiriusXM, heated mirrors, LCD monitor, heated mirrors, the "Parktronic" park assist system, and navigation with electric intelligence are all featured.

Base models feature faux-leather upholstery. The front comes standard with heating seats, and the cabin is covered in ambient lighting strips, fluently to fit with the interior design. A large panoramic sunroof is standard, however, optional features include front massaging seats, four-zone climate control, and an onboard air purifier. A heated steering wheel is also optional. With all seats up, luggage space stands at 580 litres (20 cu ft), comparing well to the W167 GLE at 630 litres (22 cu ft), especially for its shorter size. With the second row down, space stands at 1,690 litres (60 cu ft), down from 2,121 litres (74.9 cu ft) compared to its ICE counterpart.

Available exterior colours are black, Emerald Green Metallic, Polar White, Selenite Grey Metallic, Twilight Blue Metallic, Cirrus Silver Metallic, Alpine Grey, Obsidian Black Metallic, Velvet Brown, and Diamond White Metallic. Colours may differ by country. Available interior colors are black with the upholstery choices of Sable Brown or Space Grey, or Neva Grey with Sable Brown upholstery. The "Strong Recuperation" mode lets the driver ride using one-pedal.

For the base model, 19-inch five-spoke wheels with black Aero accents are available. A range of 20-inch five-spoke wheels are available, including a wave pattern print, black accents, AMG wheels with Matte Grey accents, and aero wheels with the star pattern. Finally, 21-inch wheels include, five triple spoke wheels with black accents, five quad spoke wheels also with black accents, and AMG-type multispoke wheels with black accents.

=== Safety ===
The EQE SUV features an anti-lock braking system, stability control, front impact airbags, side impact airbags, overhead airbags, knee airbags, pretensioners, and security systems which detect vehicle intrusion. A back-up camera, cross-traffic alert, Parktronic, blind spot monitor, lane departure warning, lane keeping assist, night vision, tire-pressure monitor, brake assist and traction control are all safety systems standard on the EQE SUV.

ANCAP test results Mercedes-Benz EQE SUV all variants (excluding AMG EQE 53 4MATIC+ SUV) (2023, aligned with Euro NCAP)
Test	Points	%
Overall:	5 /5 stars	
Adult occupant:	35	87%
Child occupant:	45.25	92%
Pedestrian:	50.48	80%
Safety assist:	15.65	86%

Euro NCAP test results Mercedes-Benz EQE SUV 350 4MATIC (2023)
Test	Points	%
Overall:	5 /5 stars	
Adult occupant:	35	87%
Child occupant:	44.2	90%
Pedestrian:	50.6	80%
Safety assist:	15.3	85%

=== Design ===
The full-width strip lamps which are placed on both front and rear were inspired by the EQC, which was the first vehicle to be a part of the EQ Series. The vehicle features the brand's characteristic "Black Panel" radiator grille introduced on all EQ models. The front features standard full-LED headlights which are connected seamlessly by a fibre optic strip. The number plate is placed on the bumper, which lets the full-LED taillights to give a full effect. Optionally, the EQE SUV is available with a 3D star pattern. LED “High Performance” headlamps are standard, however “DIGITAL LIGHT” is optional. Exterior windows are on the vehicle’s shoulder for aerodynamic reasons, and flush-fitting door handles are optional.

Its drag coefficient of 0.251 improves aerodynamics which helps to expand range. The EQE 300 was released in September 2022 as a less powerful variant of the 350+.

=== Charging ===
Using a wallbox unit, the EQE SUV can handle a capacity of 7.4 kilowatts, and will take a 0-100% charge of around 14 hours. Using a Type 2 unit, at a capacity of 11 kW, AC charging takes 9 hours and 45 minutes. Charging via a CCS charger (Combo 2) at a capacity of up to 173 kW, fast charging will take 28 minutes.

== 2024 update ==
For the 2024 model year, the Mercedes-Benz EQE SUV received several updates to improve efficiency, driving dynamics and user convenience. Dual-motor 4MATIC variants now include a disconnect unit that decouples the front motor when not needed, helping reduce energy consumption and boost range. The braking system has been retuned to enhance pedal feel and address earlier concerns about regenerative braking response. Although the EQE SUV already featured a standard heat pump since launch, this efficiency-focused thermal management system continues to support better cold-weather performance. Battery capacities were also slightly increased: the EQE 350+ and EQE 500 4MATIC now use a 96.0 kWh pack (up from 90.6 kWh), while the EQE 350 4MATIC receives a 90.6 kWh unit (up from 89.0 kWh). Additionally, all 2024 models now come equipped with a powered charging port door.

== Markets ==
=== North America ===
The EQE SUV came to the US in spring 2023. Trims in the US consist of the EQE350 4MATIC Premium, EQE350+ Premium, EQE350 4MATIC Exclusive, EQE350+ Exclusive, EQE350 4MATIC Pinnacle, EQE350+ Pinnacle, EQE500 4MATIC Premium, EQE500 4MATIC Exclusive, EQE500 4MATIC Pinnacle. However, in early 2026, the only models that are available are the EQE320+ and EQE320+ 4MATIC. Compared to the EQE350 models, the EQE320 models gained 27 horsepower, yet have a lower number designation. US magazine Car and Driver recommends the entry level, rear wheel drive EQE350+ Premium model as it has the longest driving range at 590 km (370 mi).

=== United Kingdom ===
In the UK, available models are the 350 4MATIC and 500 4MATIC. Available trim levels consist of the AMG Line, AMG Line Premium, AMG Line Premium Plus, and the Business Class. Prices range from £90,560 to £121,760.

=== Australia ===
On 10 May 2022, Mercedes-Benz had confirmed pricing for the EQE SUV in Australia. The vehicle had come to Australian showrooms in Q3 2023. The model is available in four guises consisting of the EQE300, EQE350 4MATIC, EQE500 4MATIC, and the AMG EQE53. The EQE 500 will be available for a limited time only. Mercedes claims the 500 model will be "highly sought after".

=== France ===
In France, available trims include the EQE 350+ Electric Art, EQE 350 4MATIC Electric Art, EQE 350+ AMG Line, EQE 500 4MATIC Electric Art, EQE 350 4MATIC AMG Line, EQE 500 4MATIC AMG Line, EQE 43 4MATIC, and EQE 53 4MATIC+. Prices range from €93,150 to €146,400.

=== India ===
The vehicle was launched on 15 September 2023 for India. The vehicle is the third Mercedes-EQ model in the Indian market, which the brand stated will expand from 4 models by March 2024. Models consist of the EQE 350 4MATIC, 350+, 500 4MATIC, 43 4MATIC and 53 4MATIC AMG models.

== Models ==
Specifications
Model	300	320+	320 4MATIC	350+	350 4MATIC	500 4MATIC	AMG 43 4MATIC	AMG 53 4MATIC+	AMG 53 4MATIC+ Dynamic Plus
Production	09/2023-	01/2026-	01/2026-	05/2022-			12/2022-	06/2023-	
Number of Motors	1		2	1	2				
Drive	2WD (RWD)		4MATIC	2WD (RWD)	4MATIC			4MATIC+	
Power	180 kW (241 hp)	235 kW (315 hp)		215 kW (288 hp)		300 kW (402 hp)	350 kW (469 hp)	460 kW (617 hp)	505 kW (677 hp)
Torque	550 N⋅m (406 lbf⋅ft)	565 N⋅m (417 lbf⋅ft)	765 N⋅m (564 lbf⋅ft)	565 N⋅m (417 lbf⋅ft)	765 N·m (564 lbf·ft)	858 N⋅m (633 lbf⋅ft)	858 N⋅m (633 lbf⋅ft)	950 N⋅m (701 lbf⋅ft)	1,000 N⋅m (738 lbf⋅ft)
0–60 mph (97 km/h)	6.2 sec	5.9 sec	6.2 sec	6.4 sec	6.2 sec	4.7 sec	4.1 sec	3.4 sec	3.1 sec
Top speed	130 mph (210 km/h)							137 mph (220 km/h)	149 mph (240 km/h)
Range	497–587 km (309–365 mi)	435–486 km (270–302 mi)	407 km (253 mi)	536–628 km (333–390 mi)	478–566 km (297–352 mi)	513–604 km (319–375 mi)	425–474 km (264–295 mi)	411–454 km (255–282 mi)	411–454 km (255–282 mi)
Curb weight	2,440 kg (5379 lbs)	2,435 kg (5,368 lbs)	2500 kg (5,512 lbs)	2,490 kg (5,490 lb)	2,560 kg (5,640 lb)	2,610 kg (5,750 lb)	2,600 kg (5,700 lb)	2,690 kg (5,930 lb)	2,690 kg (5,930 lb)
Gross weight	2,995 kg (6,602 lbs)			2,995 kg (6,603 lb)	3,115 kg (6,867 lb)	3,115 kg (6,867 lb)	3,195 kg (7,044 lb)	3,195 kg (7,044 lb)	3,195 kg (7,044 lb)
Suspension	Active Suspension						AIRMATIC	AIRMATIC+	
Ground Clearance	162 mm (6.4 in)						154–179 mm (6.1–7.0 in)		

== Sales ==
Year	China	
	EQE SUV	AMG
2023	5,224	—
2024	7,230	—
2025	4,036	19
