= Mercedes-Benz EQE =

Battery electric executive car

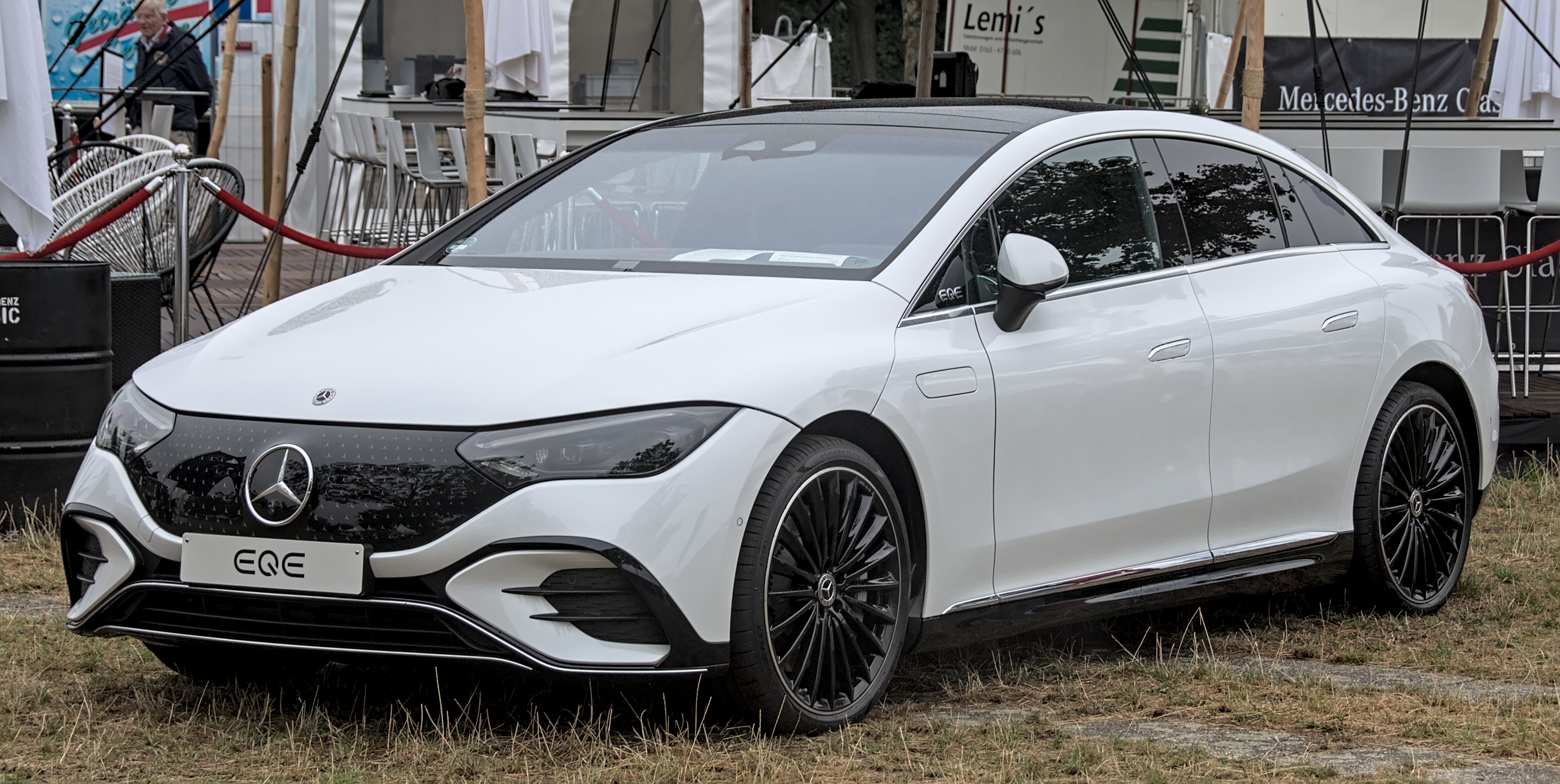

Overview
- Manufacturer: Mercedes-Benz Group
- Model code: V295
- Production: 2022–present
- Model years: 2023–present
- Assembly: Germany: Bremen (Bremen plant); China: Beijing (Beijing Benz)
- Designer: Bastian Baudy

Body and chassis
- Class: Executive car (E)
- Body style: 4-door saloon
- Layout: Rear-motor, rear-wheel-drive; Dual-motor, all-wheel-drive (4Matic)
- Platform: Mercedes-Benz EVA
- Related: Mercedes-Benz EQE SUV; Mercedes-Benz EQS; Mercedes-Benz EQS SUV

Powertrain
- Electric motor: Permanent magnet AC synchronous
- Power output: 183–215 kW (245–288 hp) (single motor RWD); 215–505 kW (288–677 hp) (dual motor AWD)
- Battery: 90.6 kWh 400V NCM 811 328 volts lithium ion
- Range: 459–660 km (285–410 mi) (WLTP)
- Plug-in charging: 170 kW DC; 11 kW AC (or 22 kW AC in option)

Dimensions
- Wheelbase: 3,120 mm (122.8 in)
- Length: 4,946–4,995 mm (194.7–196.7 in)
- Width: 1,960 mm (77.2 in)
- Height: 1,512–1,513 mm (59.5–59.6 in)
- Kerb weight: 2,355–2,525 kg (5,192–5,567 lb)

The Mercedes-Benz EQE (V295) is a battery electric executive car produced by German automobile manufacturer Mercedes-Benz Group. It is part of the EQ family, and was presented at the Munich Motor Show 2021. The only model available at launch was the rear-motor EQE 350. Its engine has a peak power of 215 kW (292 PS), and it has a range of up to 660 km (410 mi). More variants were said to follow later, including a 4Matic AWD dual-motor setup with a peak engine power output of up to 500 kW (680 PS). The U.S. will get one version simply called the Mercedes AMG EQE which is the same as the 460 kW (625 PS; 617 hp) EQE 53 4matic+ seen in Europe.

In February 2022, the high-performance Mercedes-AMG EQE 43 & 53 4MATIC+ versions were unveiled. Changes include power bumps of up to 505 kW (687 PS; 678 hp), 1,000 N⋅m (738 lb⋅ft) of torque, upgraded internals and AMG touches inside and out.

In March 2022, the EQE 350 4MATIC and EQE 500 4MATIC were unveiled. In July 2022, the cheaper EQE 300 version was unveiled.

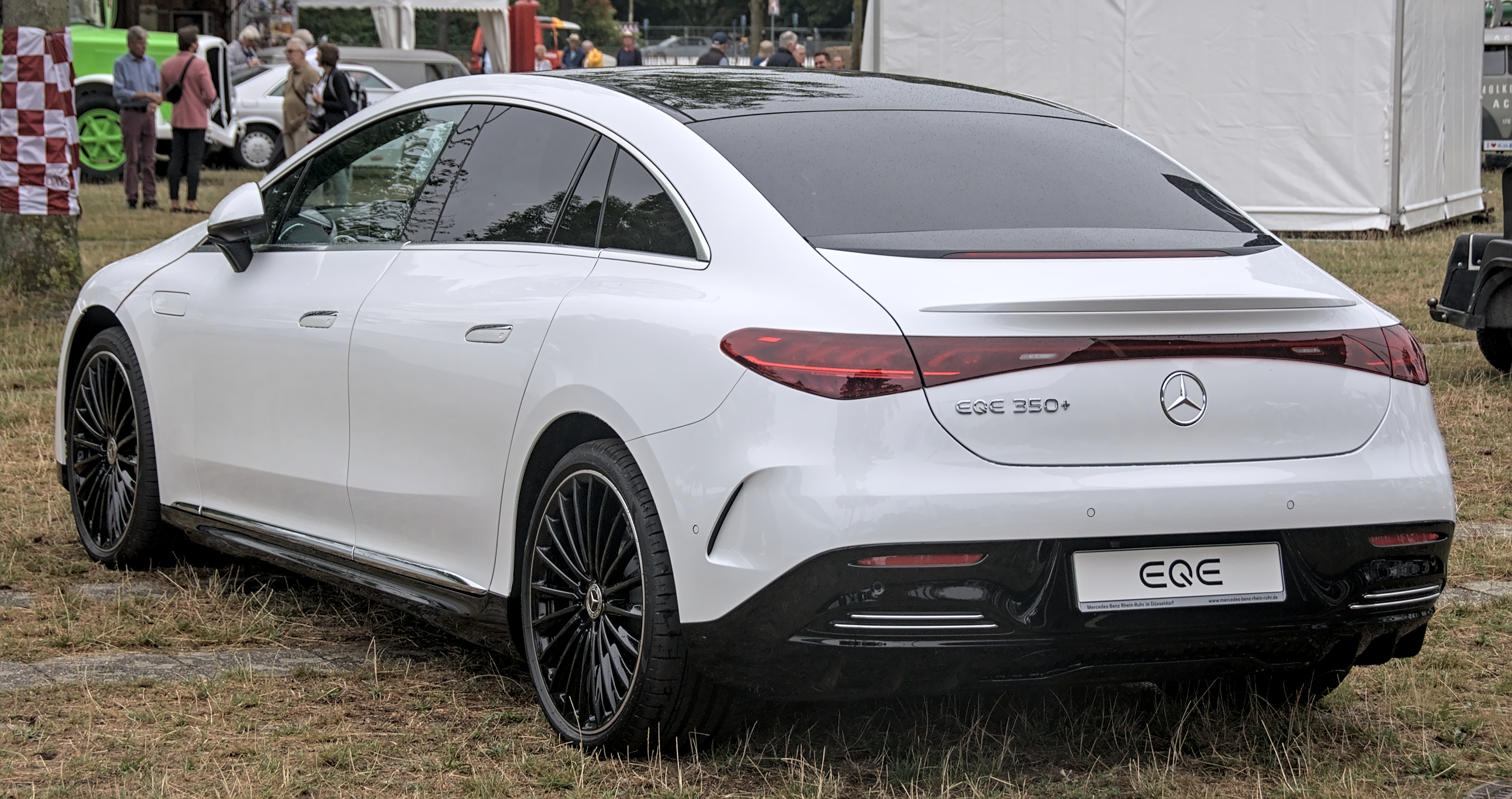
Rear view

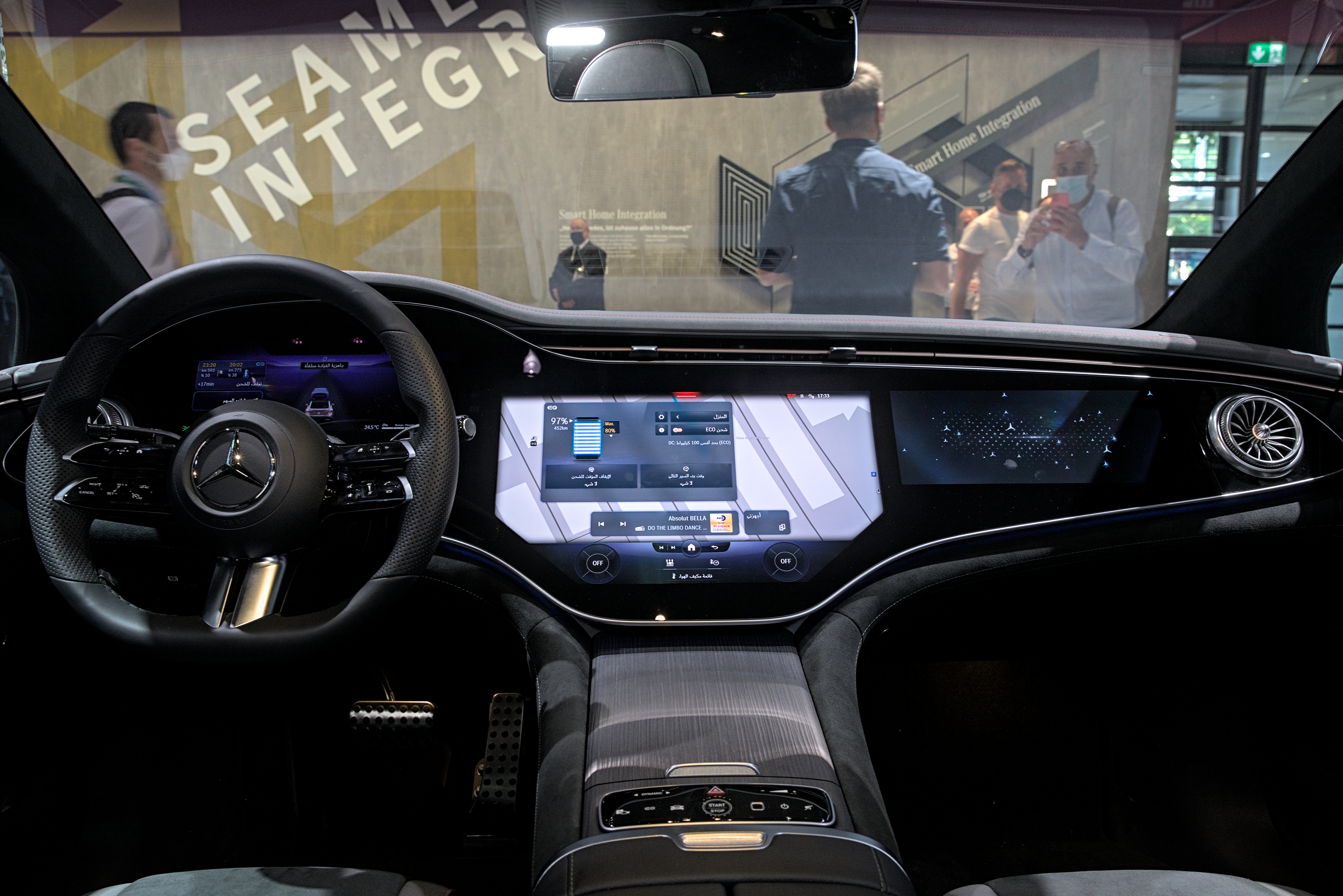
Interior

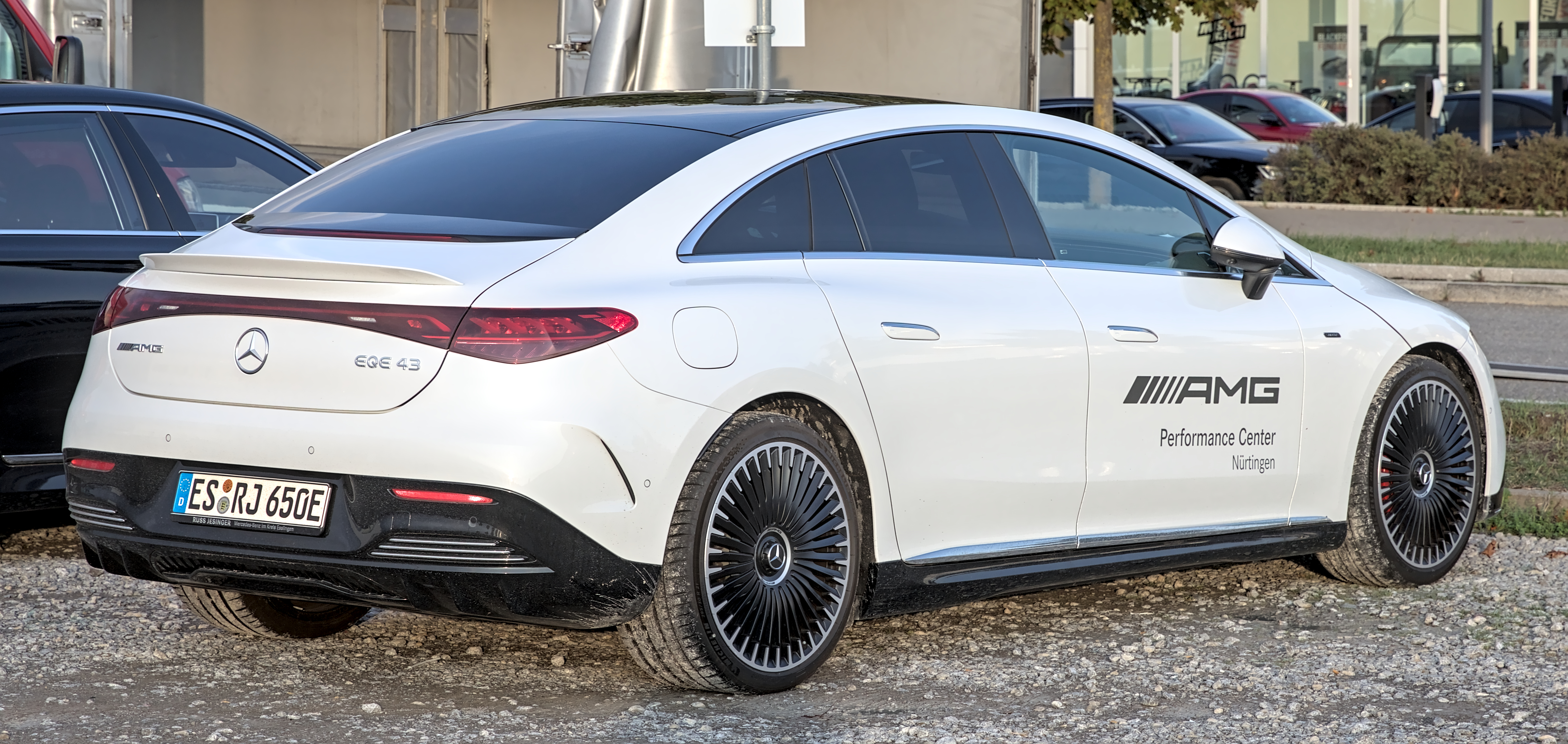
Mercedes-AMG EQE 43 4MATIC

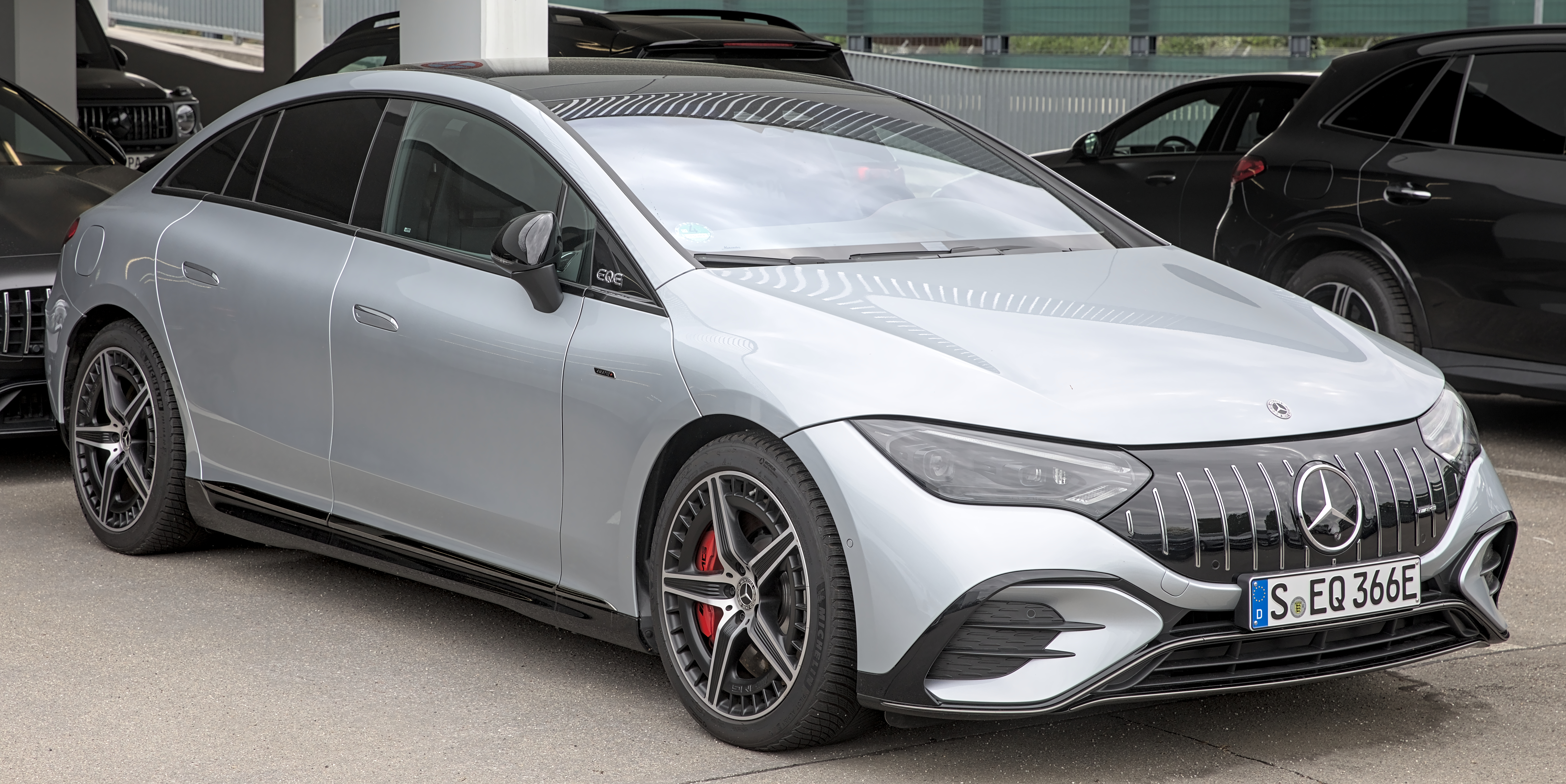
Mercedes-AMG EQE 53 4MATIC

== Models ==
The specifications include:

| Model | Years | Power | Torque | Battery Capacity full/usable [kWh] | Drivetrain | 0–100 km/h (0–62 mph) | Top speed | Max. Range (WLTP) | Range (EPA) | Ref |
|---|---|---|---|---|---|---|---|---|---|---|
| EQE 300 | 2022– | 180 kW (245 PS; 241 hp) | 550 N⋅m (406 lb⋅ft) | 100/89 | RWD | 7.3 s | 210 km/h (130 mph) | 550–639 km (342–397 mi) | | |
| EQE 350 | 2022– | 215 kW (292 PS; 288 hp) | 565 N⋅m (417 lb⋅ft) | 100/89 | RWD | 6.4 s | 210 km/h (130 mph) | 550–639 km (342–397 mi) | | |
| EQE 350+ | 2022– | 215 kW (292 PS; 288 hp) | 565 N⋅m (417 lb⋅ft) | 100/90.6 | RWD | 6.4 s | 210 km/h (130 mph) | 545–660 km (339–410 mi) | | |
| EQE 350 4MATIC | 2022– | 215 kW (292 PS; 288 hp) | 765 N⋅m (564 lb⋅ft) | 100/90.6 | 4WD | 6.3 s | 210 km/h (130 mph) | 507–597 km (315–371 mi) | | |
| EQE 500 4MATIC | 2022– | 300 kW (408 PS; 402 hp) | 858 N⋅m (633 lb⋅ft) | 100/90.6 | 4WD | 4.7 s | 210 km/h (130 mph) | 505–596 km (314–370 mi) | | |
| AMG EQE 43; 4MATIC | 2022– | 350 kW (476 PS; 469 hp) | 858 N⋅m (633 lb⋅ft) | 100/90.6 | 4WD | 4.2 s | 210 km/h (130 mph) | 463–534 km (288–332 mi) | | |
| AMG EQE 53; 4MATIC+ | 2022– | 460–505 kW (625–687 PS; 617–677 hp) | 950–1,000 N⋅m (701–738 lb⋅ft) | 100/90.6 | 4WD | 3.3–3.5 s | 220–240 km/h (137–149 mph) | 459–526 km (285–327 mi) | | |

== Safety ==
In August 2024, a Mercedes EQE exploded into flames in an Incheon, South Korea, car park, resulting in 140 cars damaged and 23 people hospitalised. The car was not being charged at the time of the explosion and the cause of the fire is being investigated.

=== Euro NCAP ===
Euro NCAP test results Mercedes-Benz EQE 350+ AMG Line (LHD) (2022)
| Test | Points | % |
|---|---|---|
| Overall: | 5 /5 stars | |
| Adult occupant: | 36.4 | 95% |
| Child occupant: | 45 | 91% |
| Pedestrian: | 45.1 | 83% |
| Safety assist: | 13.1 | 81% |

=== ANCAP ===
ANCAP test results Mercedes-Benz EQE (2022, aligned with Euro NCAP)
| Test | Points | % |
|---|---|---|
| Overall: | 5 /5 stars | |
| Adult occupant: | 36.37 | 95% |
| Child occupant: | 45.22 | 92% |
| Pedestrian: | 45.15 | 83% |
| Safety assist: | 13.13 | 82% |

== Sales ==
| Year | China | |
| Year | EQE | AMG |
|---|---|---|
| 2023 | 8,779 | 129 |
| 2024 | 5,291 | 101 |
| 2025 | 2,757 | 79 |
