= Mercedes-Benz Vision EQ Silver Arrow =

Electric concept sports car

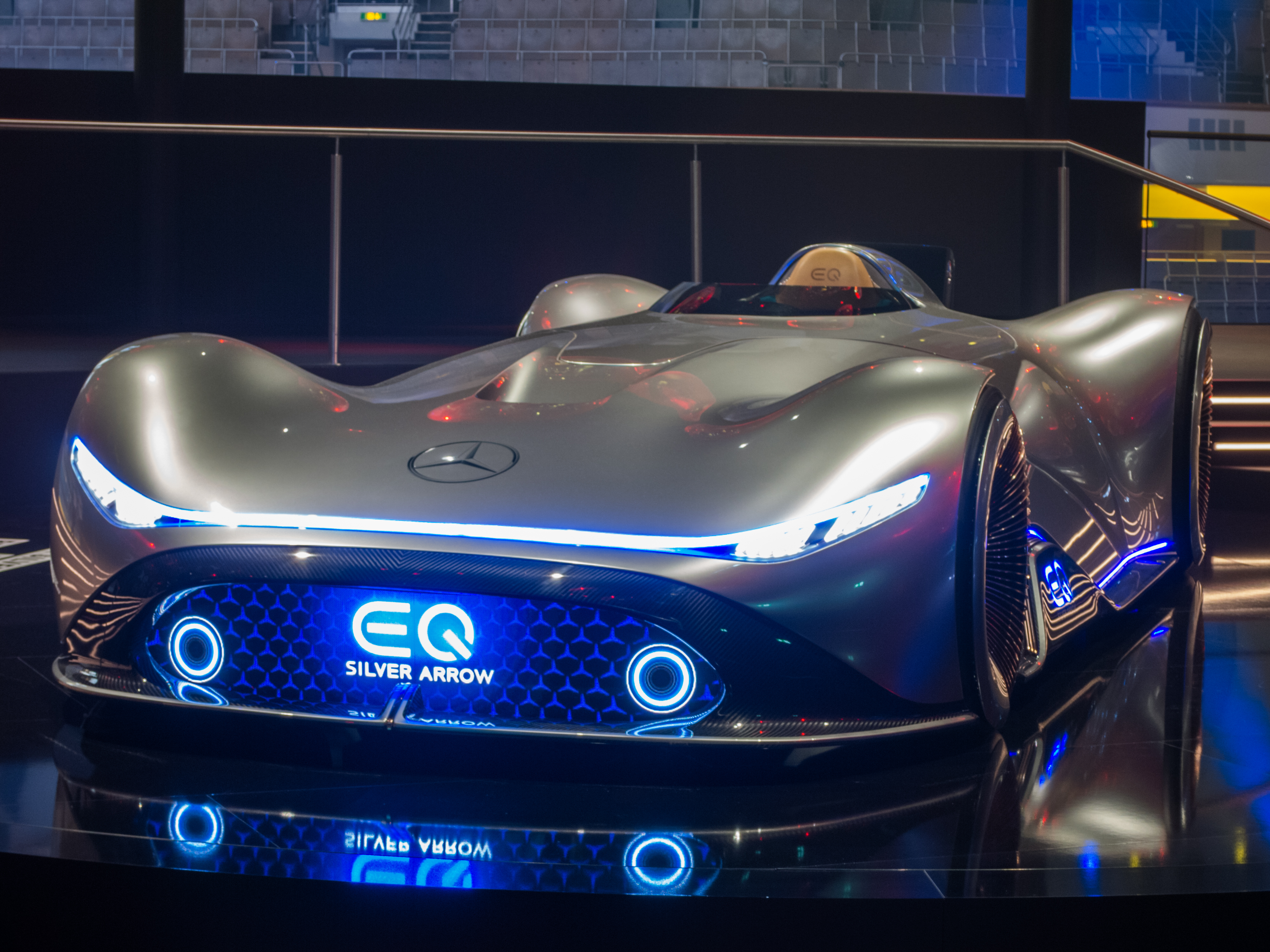

Overview
- Manufacturer: Mercedes-Benz (Daimler AG)
- Production: 2018 (concept car)
- Designer: Matthias Schenker

Body and chassis
- Class: Sports car
- Layout: Four-wheel-drive

Powertrain
- Engine: electric, 750 PS (740 hp; 552 kW)
- Transmission: Single-speed transmission

Dimensions
- Wheelbase: 3,099 mm (122.0 in)
- Length: 5,159 mm (203.1 in)
- Width: 1,770 mm (69.7 in)
- Height: 1,049 mm (41.3 in)
- Curb weight: 1,984 lb (900 kg)

The Mercedes-Benz Vision EQ Silver Arrow is an electric concept car produced by German manufacturer Mercedes-Benz, in collaboration Daimler AG, and revealed at the 2018 Pebble Beach Concours d'Elegance, announcing the arrival of the manufacturers EQ electric vehicle range. It uses retro styling, and pays homage to the Mercedes-Benz W125 Rekordwagen.

== Presentation ==
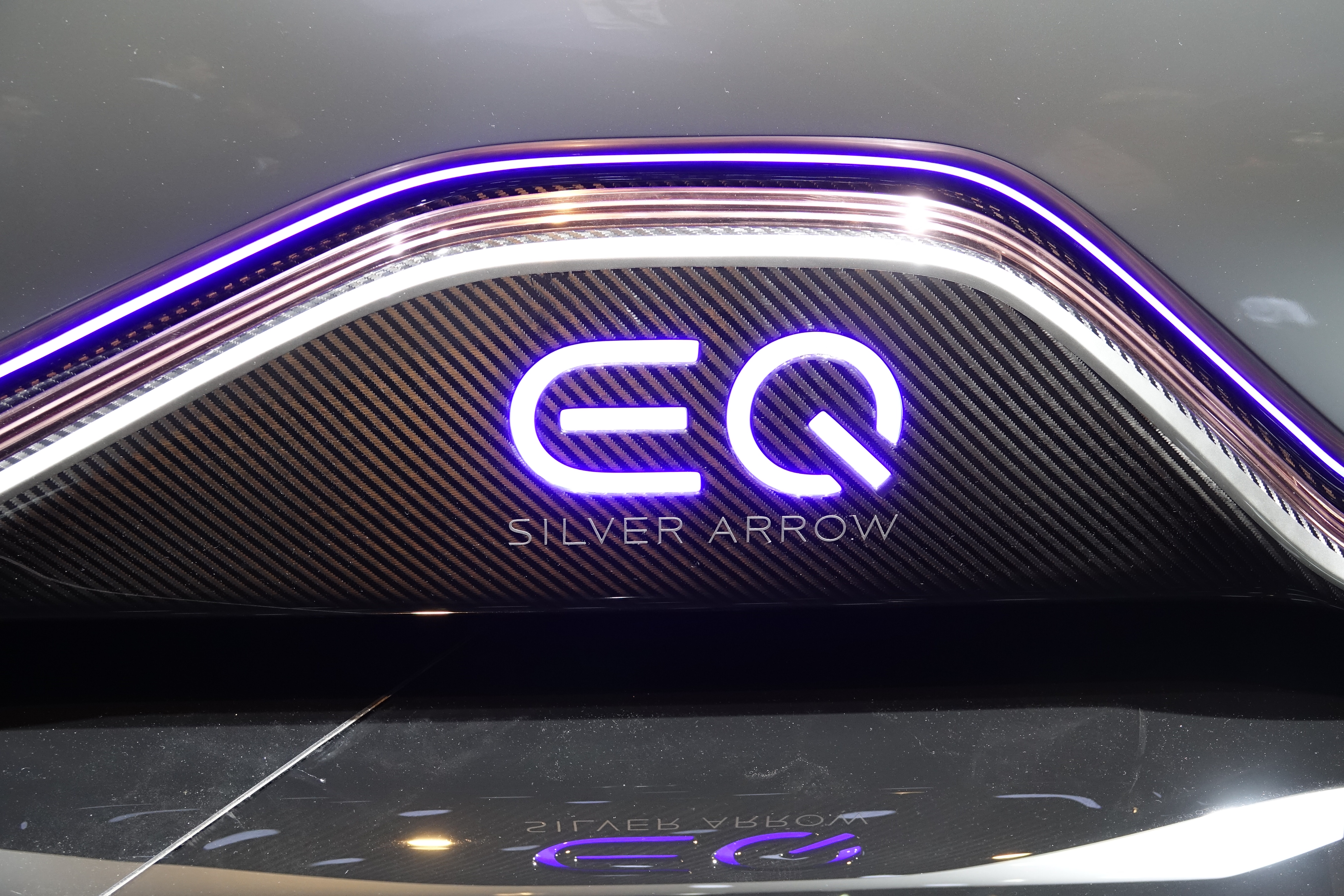
Mercedes-Benz EQ electric

The Mercedes Vision EQ Silver Arrow was presented on 24 August 2018 at the 2018 Pebble Beach Concours d'Elegance in California, United States, before its European exhibition at the 2018 Paris Motor Show.

The latest Mercedes-Benz concept cars are called “Vision” and the manufacturer's future electric range is called “EQ”. With this new electric concept car, Mercedes pays homage to the Silver Arrows and in particular the Mercedes-Benz W125 Rekordwagen which established the speed record for a kilometre, achieving 432.7 km/h in 1938. Unlike its predecessor, the 2018 Silver Arrow is 100% electric, it swaps the 5,573cc V12 for a 750hp electric motor with an 80 kWh battery.

== Technical specifications ==
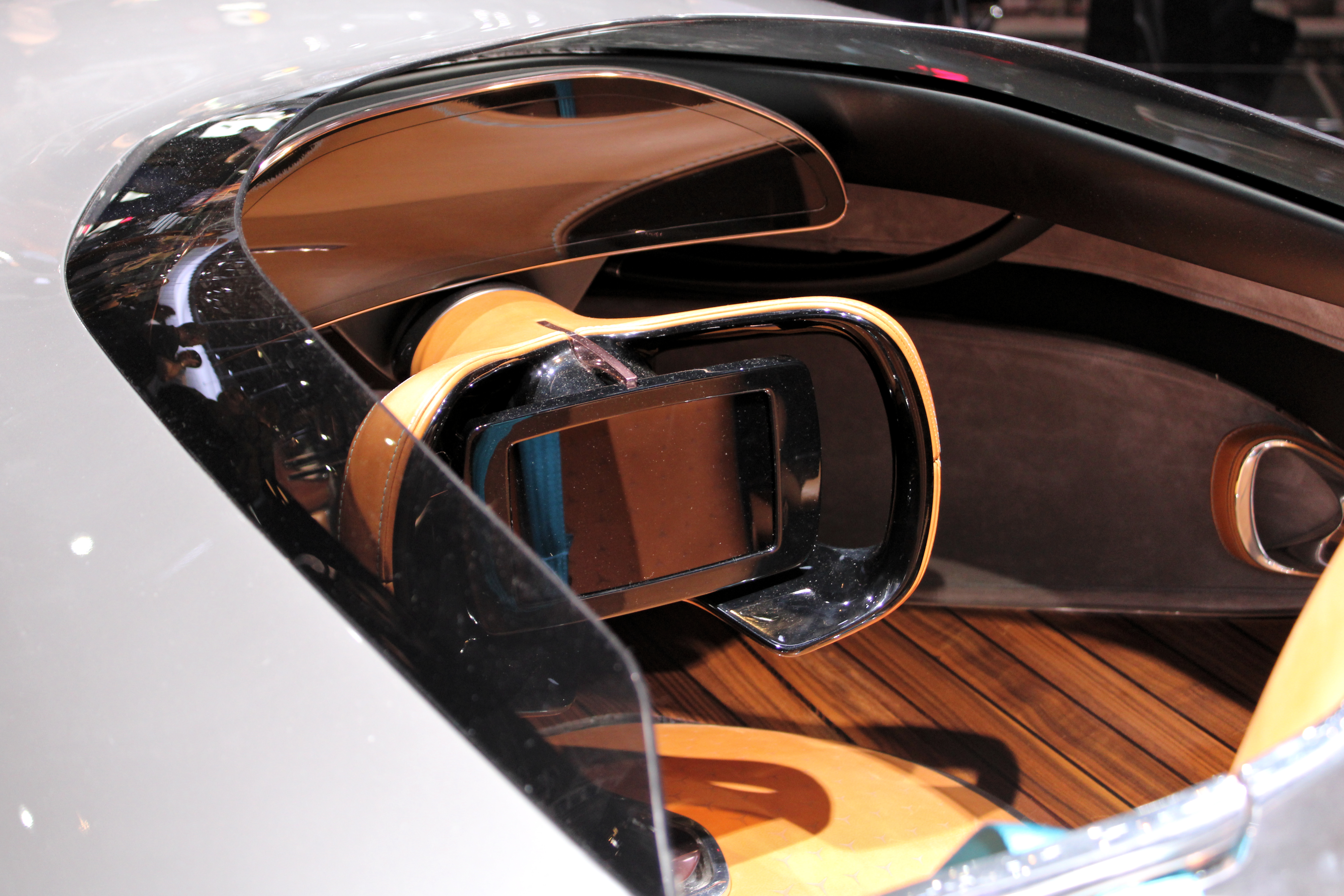
Vehicle cockpit

The Silver Arrow features a carbon fibre body and its steering wheel is equipped with a touch screen in its centre. On the dashboard it also receives a screen which reproduces images in 3D.

The rear of the car has a retractable two-part pressure wing and a flip-up cover of the cockpit intended only for the driver, as there is only one seat in the car. The battery has a capacity of 80 kWh. The electric motor provides a power output of 550kW, equivalent to 750hp, and benefits from a range of 400km from its 80kWh battery.

The car has Pirelli tires measuring 255/25 R24 at the front and 305/25 R26 at the rear.

== Design ==
=== Exterior ===
The car is 530 centimetres long. At the front is a digital grille, featuring narrow headlights connected by an LED strip.

=== Interior ===
The interior features a wooden floor, a leather sports seat, ambient lighting and a sports steering wheel. There are also a pair of digital displays, of which the far one monitors the route, and the one on the steering wheel shows speed and other important data.

== Gallery ==
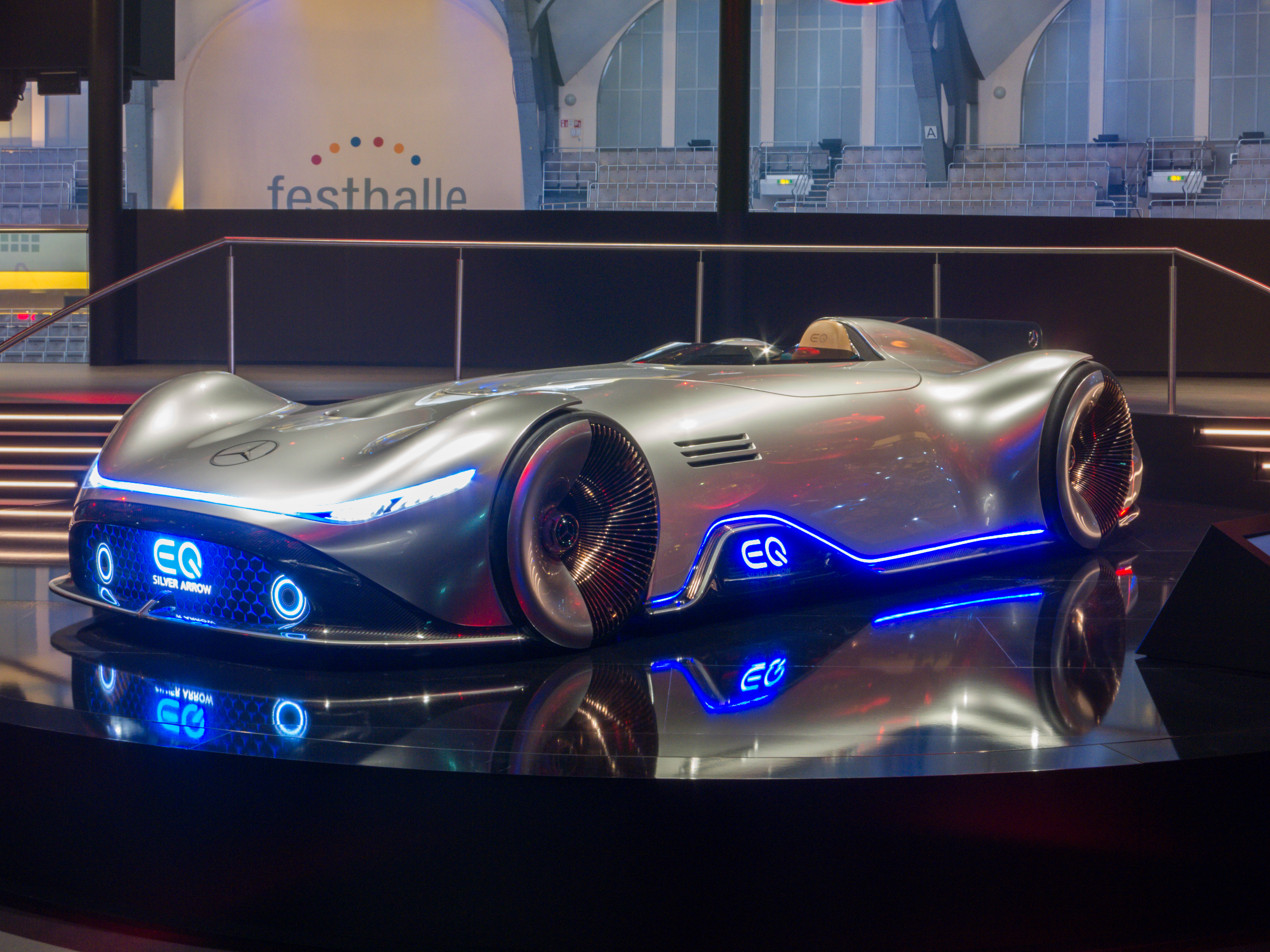
Mercedes-Benz Vision EQ Silver Arrow IAA 2019

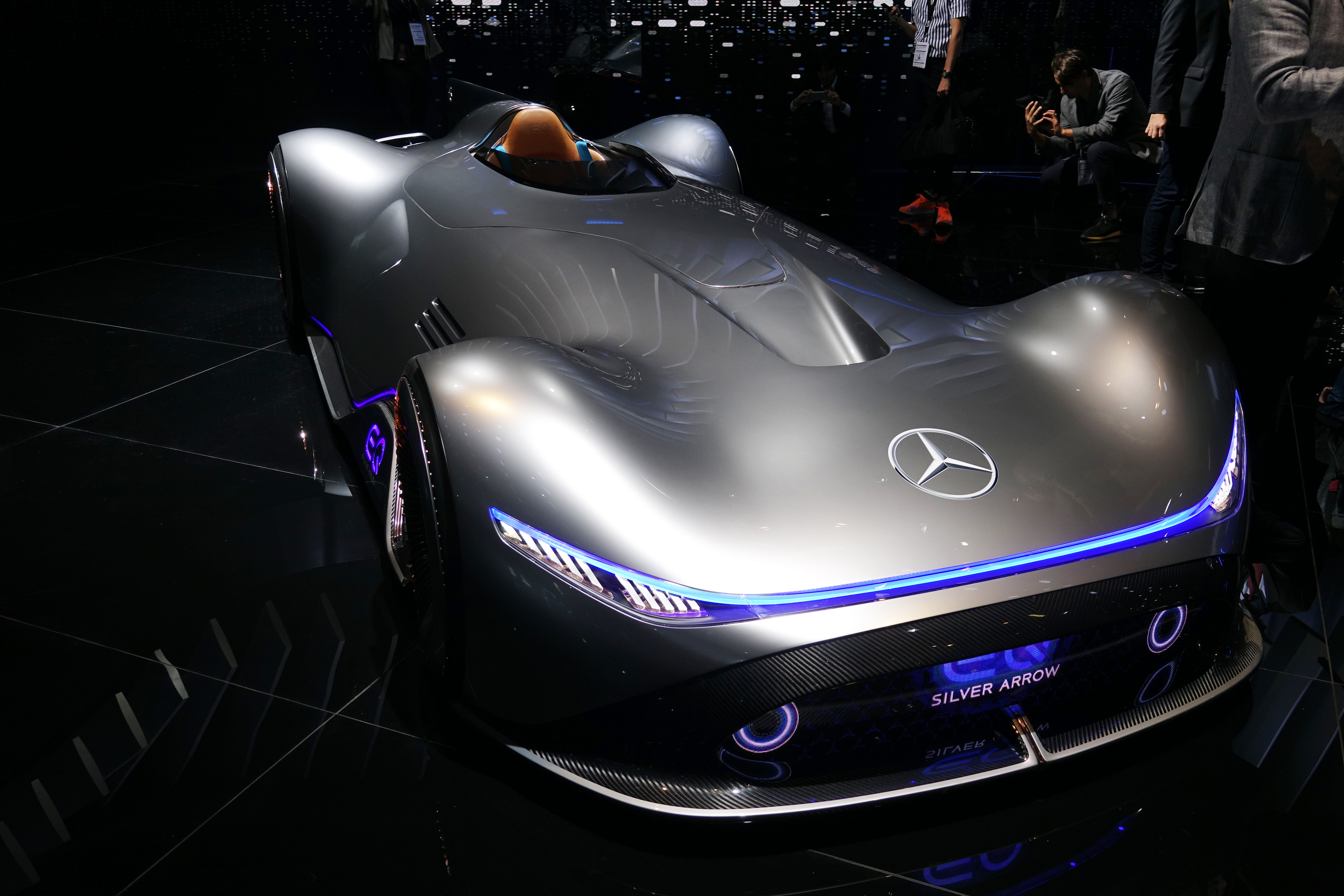
Mercedes-Benz Vision EQ Silver Arrow at Mondial Paris 2018
Mercedes-Benz Vision EQ Silver Arrow at the 2018 Paris Motor Show

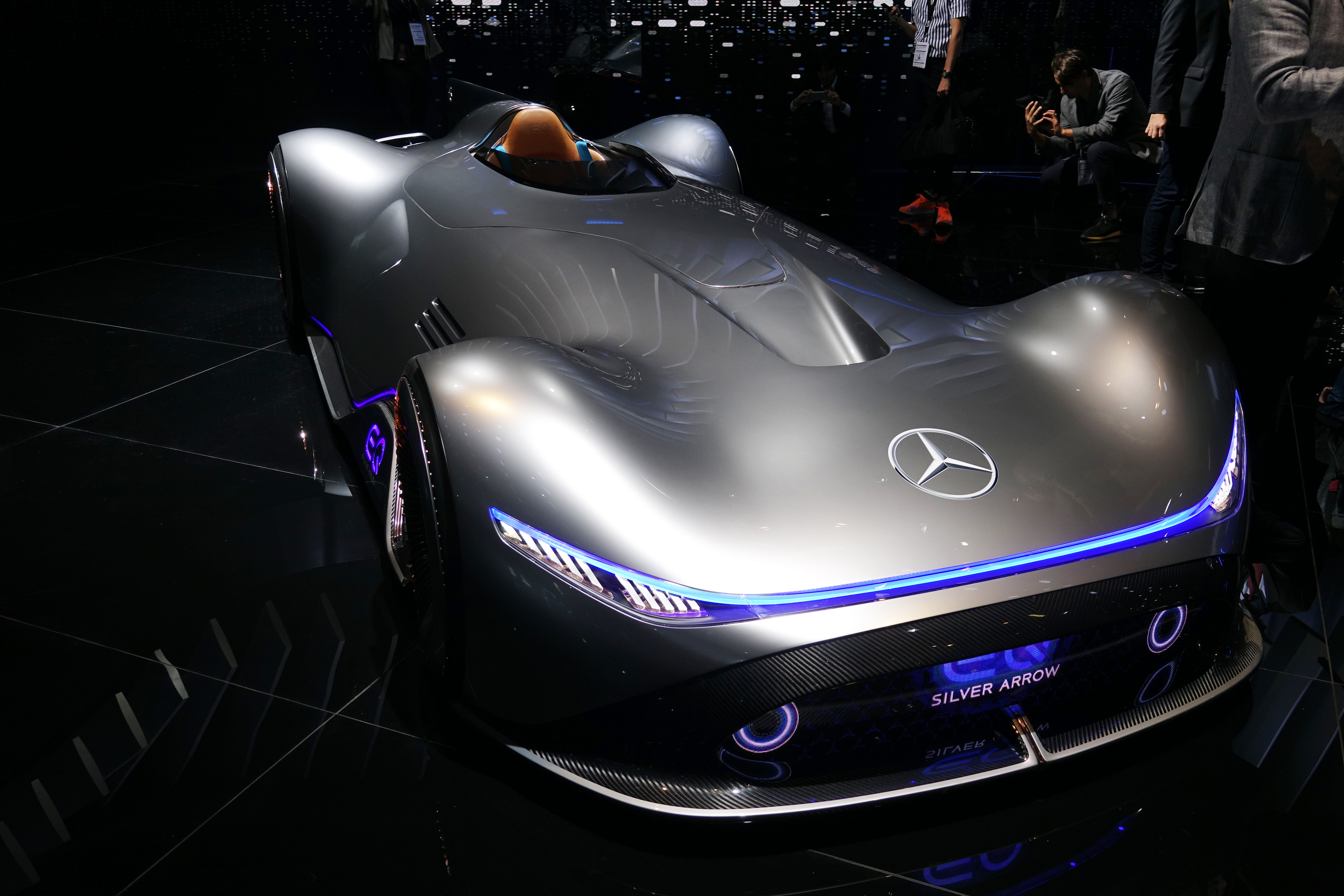

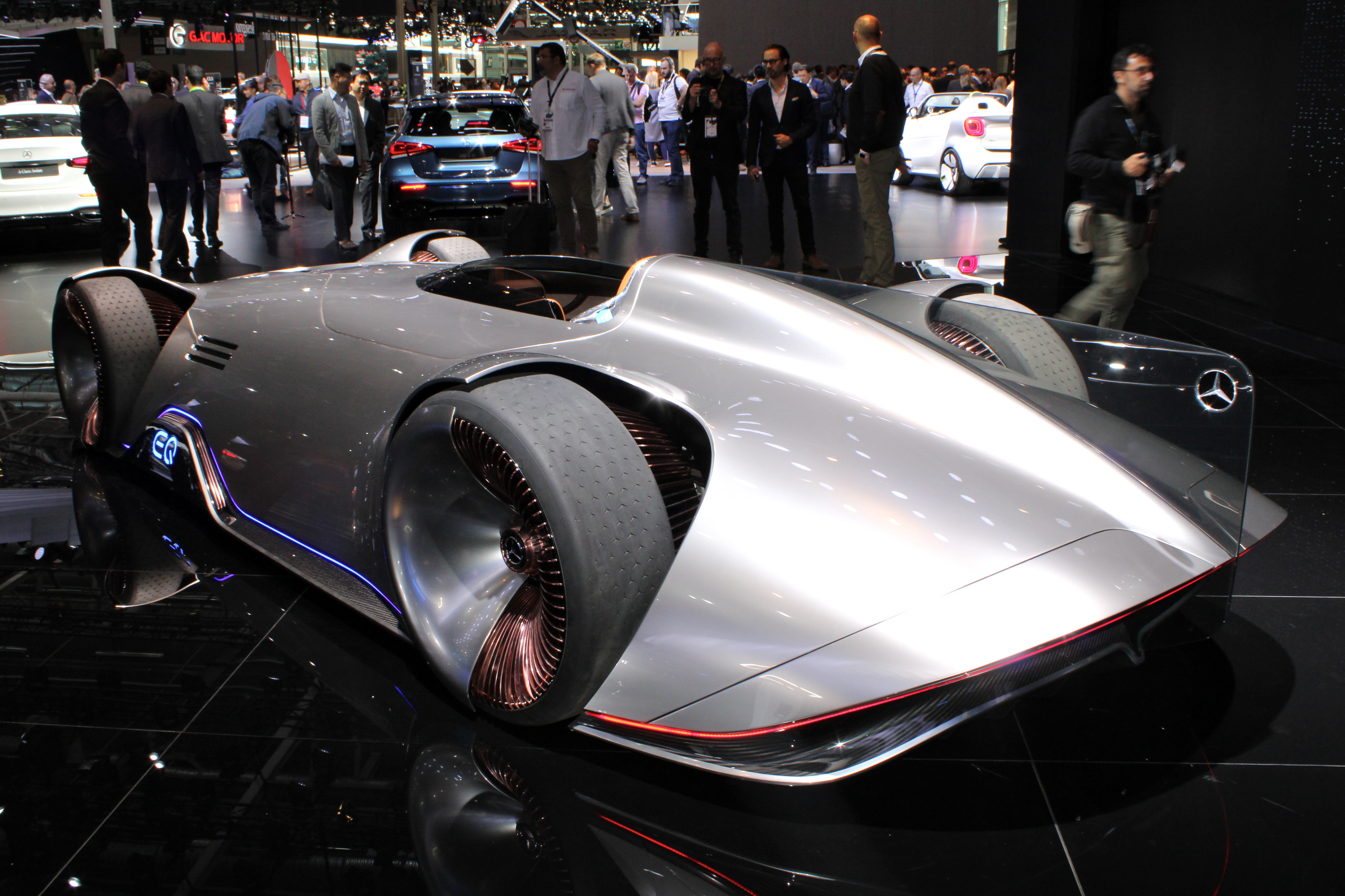

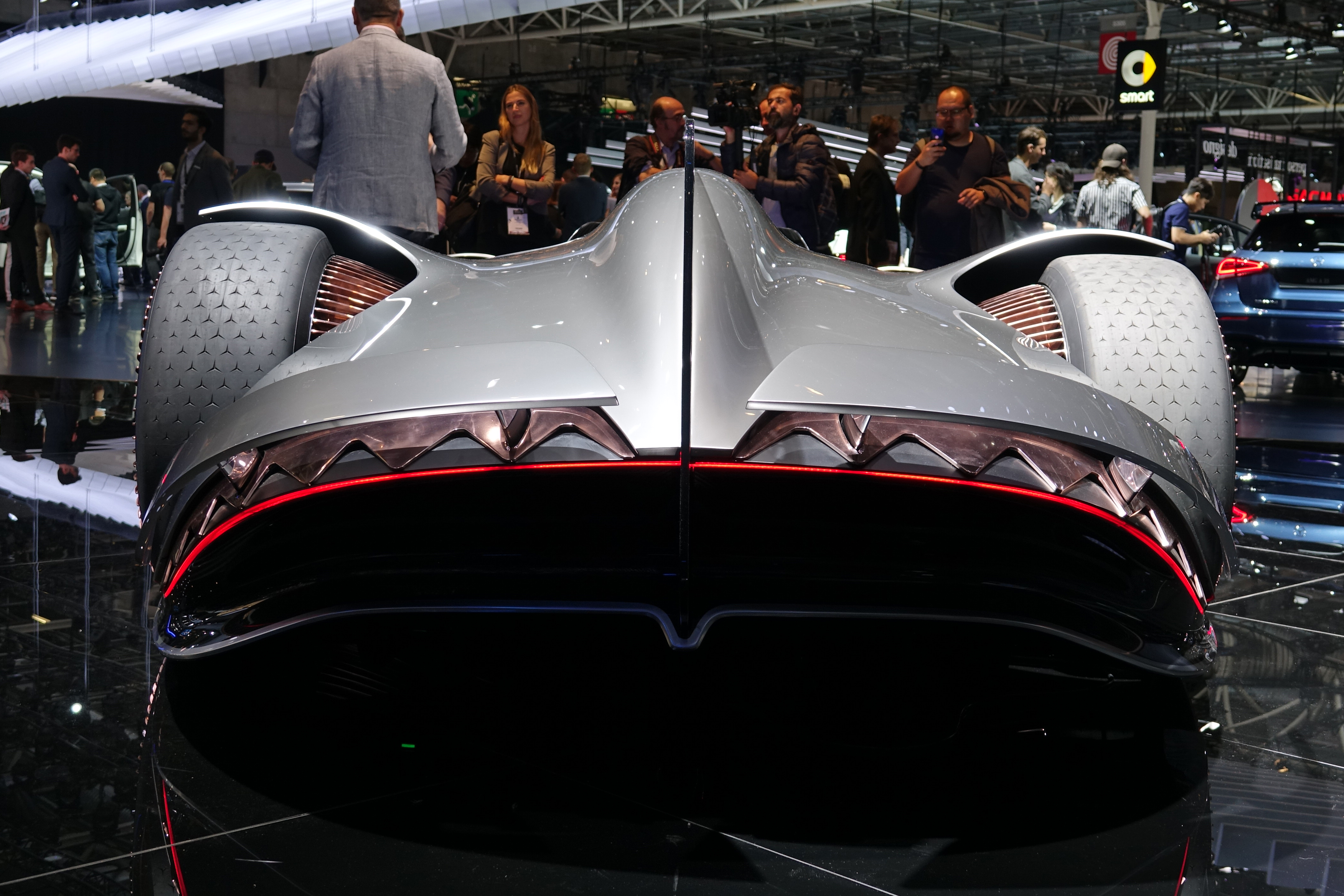

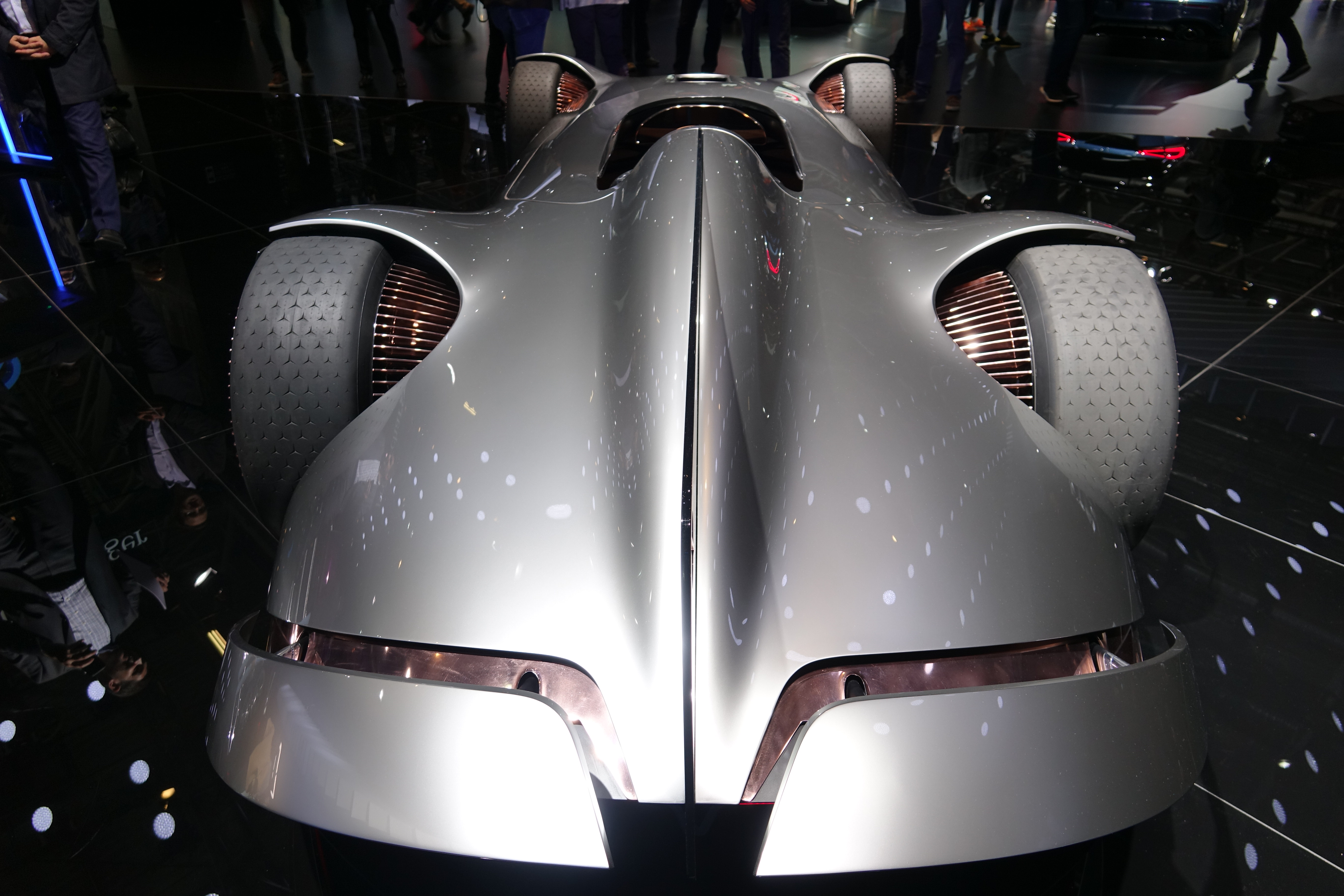

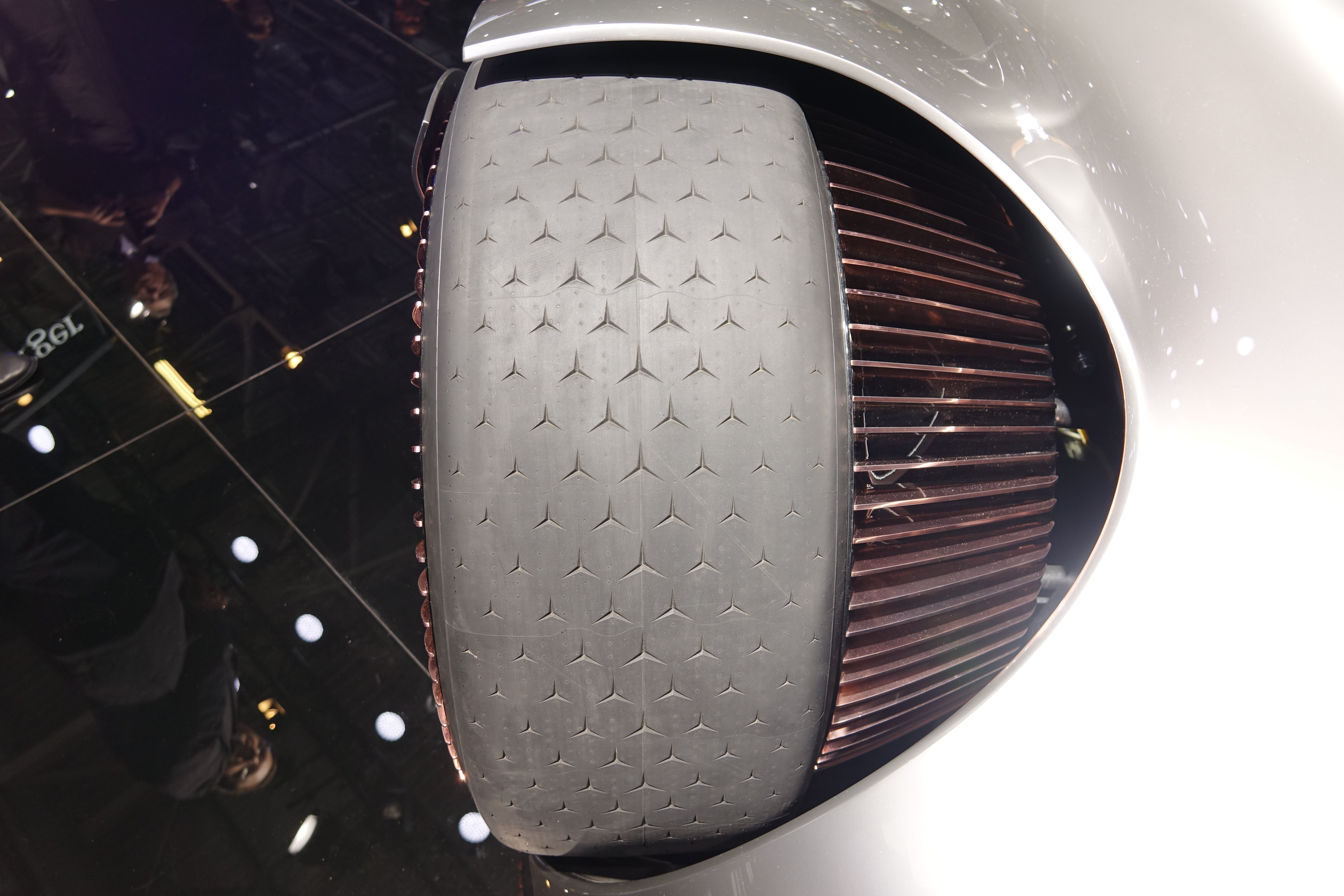

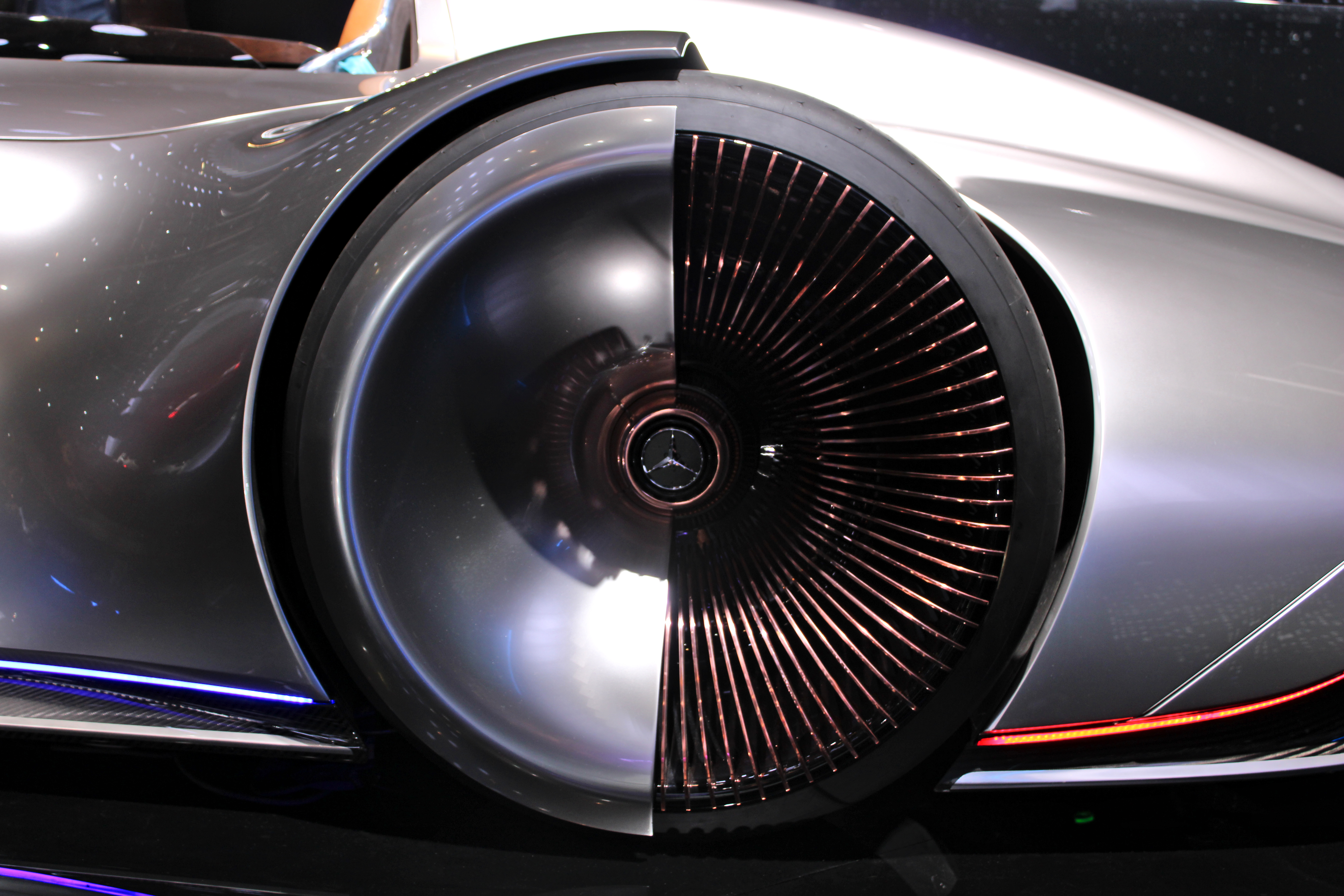

== See also ==
- Audi AI:RACE
- Electric vehicle
- Mercedes-Benz Vision EQXX
