= Eqe Bay =

Bay in Nunavut, Canada

- Location within Nunavut
- Location: Foxe Basin
- Coordinates: 69°37′N 76°24′W
- Ocean/sea sources: Arctic Ocean
- Basin countries: Canada
- Settlements: Uninhabited

Eqe Bay is an irregularly shaped, uninhabited waterway in the Qikiqtaaluk Region, Nunavut, Canada. It is located on the western coast of north-central Baffin Island. An arm of the Foxe Basin, it contains no islands within it, but Bray Island lies outside the mouth of the bay 45 km (28 mi) to the south.

== Geology ==
The bay is within the northeastern Rae Craton.
