= Mercedes-Benz EQC =

Electric compact luxury crossover SUV

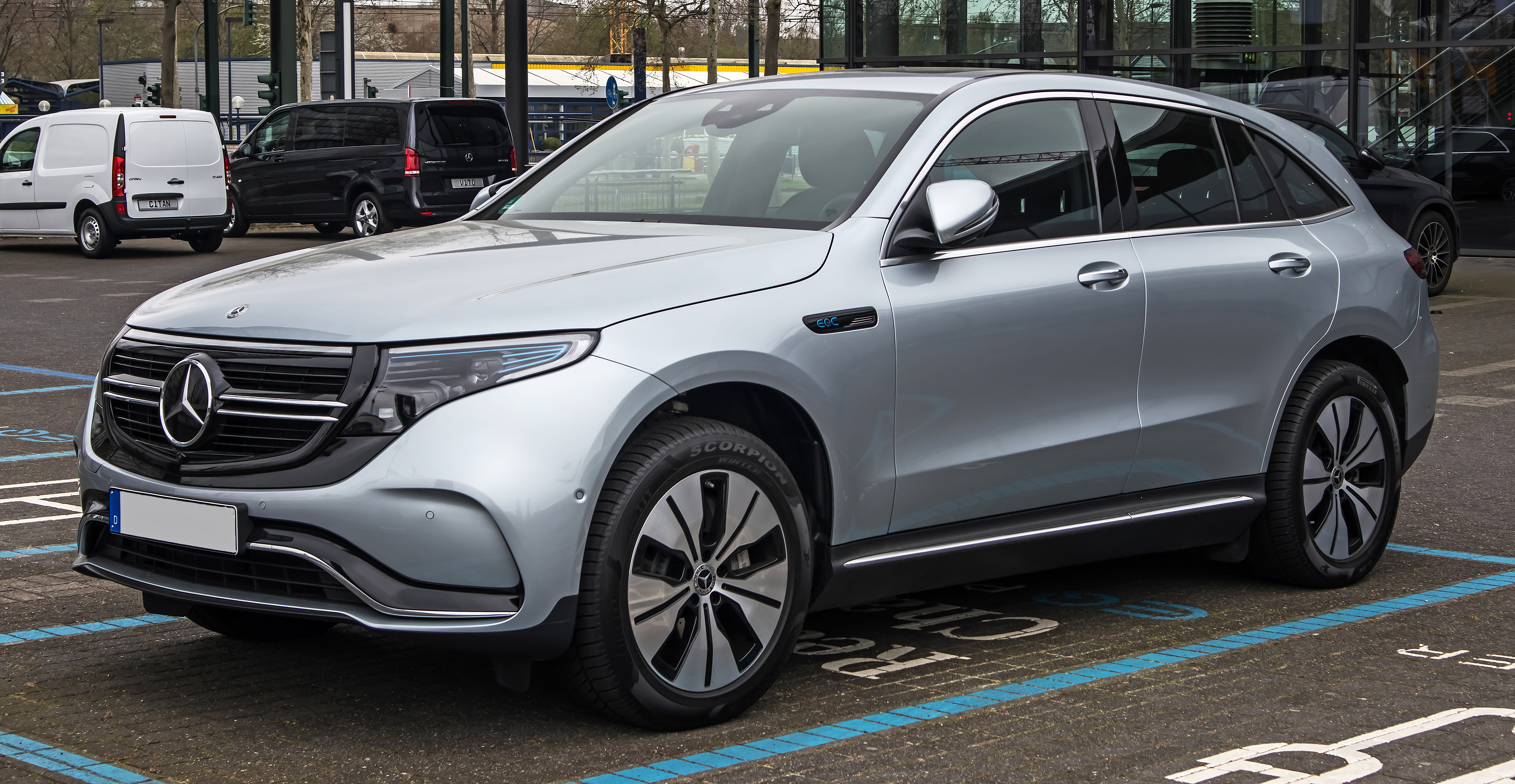

Overview
- Manufacturer: Daimler AG (2019–2022); Mercedes-Benz Group (2022–2023)
- Model code: N293
- Production: 2019–2023
- Assembly: Germany: Bremen (Mercedes-Benz Bremen Plant); China: Beijing (Beijing Benz)
- Designer: Robert Lešnik, Michael Frei

Body and chassis
- Class: Compact luxury crossover SUV
- Body style: 5-door SUV
- Layout: Dual-motor, four-wheel drive (4matic)
- Platform: Mercedes-Benz MRA Platform
- Related: Mercedes-Benz GLC (X253/C253)

Powertrain
- Engine: 2x asynchronous electric motors
- Transmission: Single speed with fixed ratio
- Battery: 80 kWh lithium ion
- Range: 220 mi (354 km) (EPA-estimated); 259 mi (417 km) WLTP
- Plug-in charging: 7.4 kW AC / 11 kW AC; 110 kW DC

Dimensions
- Wheelbase: 2,873 mm (113.1 in)
- Length: 4,761 mm (187.4 in)
- Width: 1,884 mm (74.2 in)
- Height: 1,624 mm (63.9 in)
- Kerb weight: 2,425 kg (5,346 lb)

Chronology
- Successor: Mercedes-Benz GLC Electric

The Mercedes-Benz EQC (N293) is a battery electric compact luxury crossover SUV produced by Mercedes-Benz from 2019 to 2023. It is the first member of the battery electric Mercedes EQ family.

== History ==
The EQC is based on the Generation EQ concept that was unveiled at the 2016 Paris Motor Show. The final production version was revealed in Sweden on 4 September 2018, and publicly debuted at the 2018 Paris Motor Show.

Production of the EQC ended in the second half of 2023.

== Design ==
The EQC is based on the GLC and shares the same wheelbase dimensions. It is a five-seater vehicle and has a trunk capacity of 500 litres (18 ft^{3}).

The EQC400 4Matic is powered by 2 asynchronous electric motors, fitted on the front and rear axles, and produces 300 kW (402 hp). It has an electronically limited top speed of 180 km/h (112 mph).

The 80 kWh battery pack has a modular design and consists of 384 lithium-ion cells. It can be charged from 10 to 80 per cent in 40 minutes, via a DC fast charger.

Steering wheel paddle shifters allow for the selection of varying levels of brake energy regeneration.

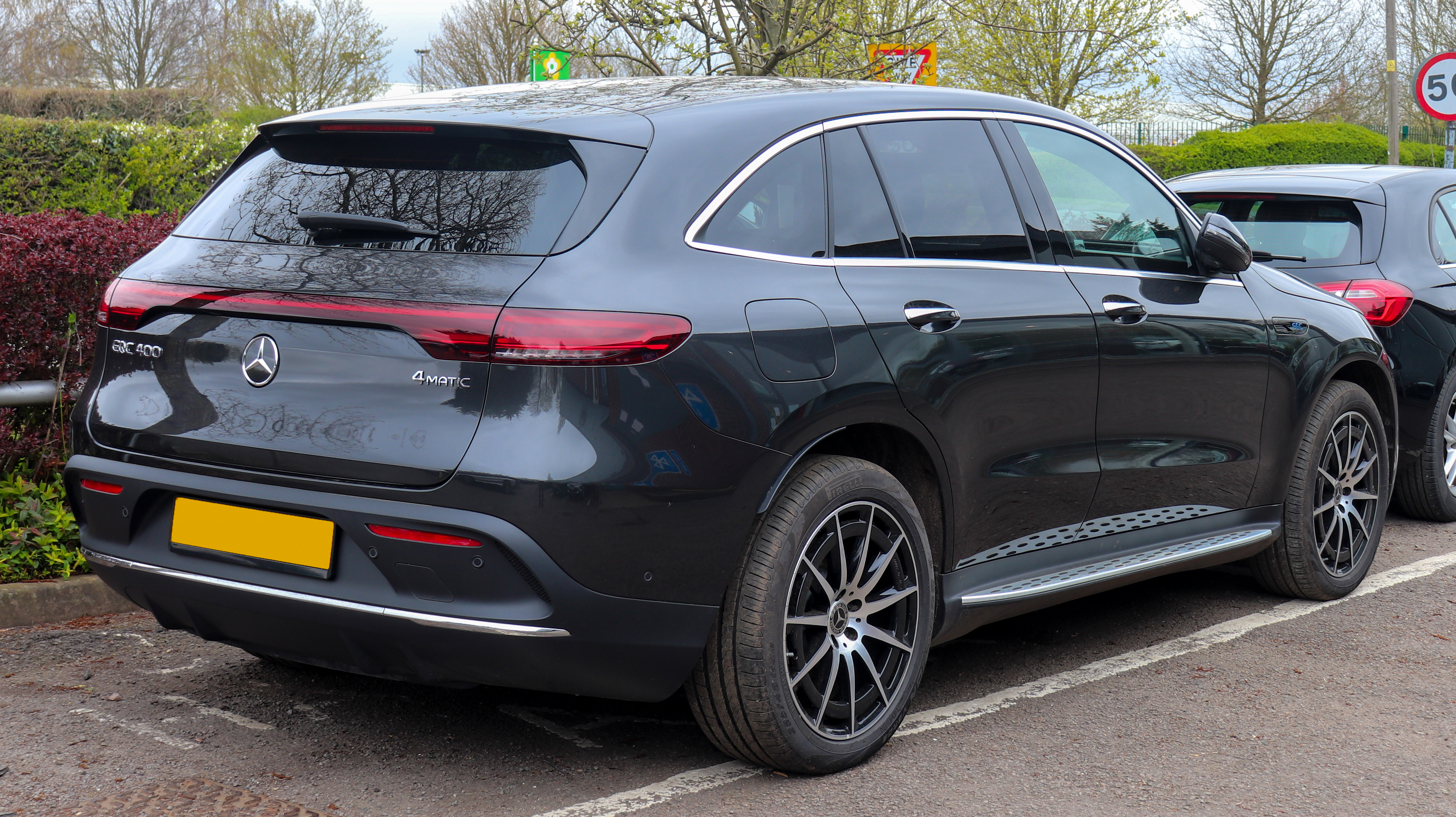
Rear view

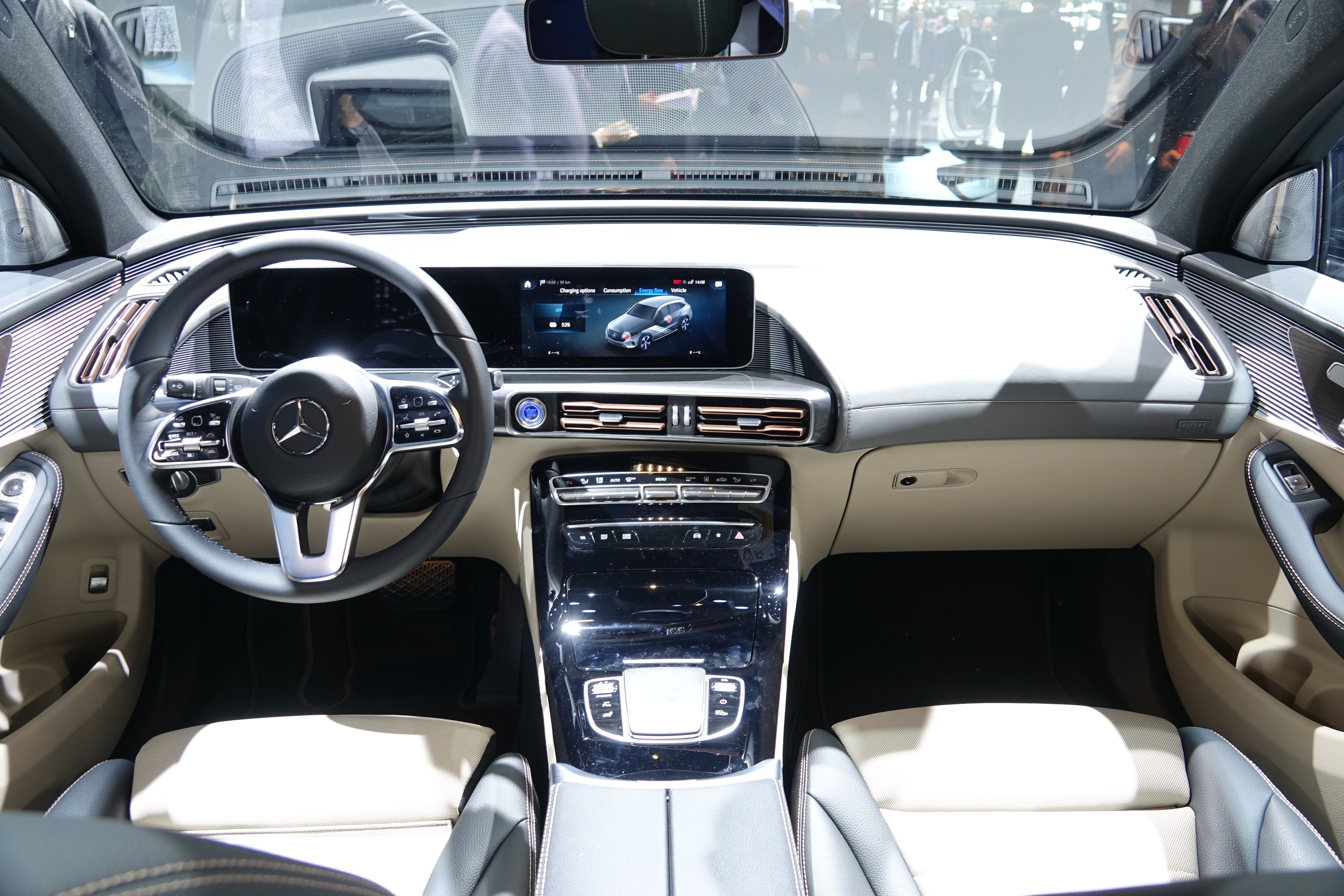
Interior

== Equipment ==
Standard equipment includes 19-inch alloy wheels, automatic collision avoidance, and two 10.25-inch interior displays for the instrument cluster and infotainment system. All models feature the Mercedes-Benz User Experience (MBUX) system, which features a voice-controlled smart-assistant that can be activated by saying "Hey Mercedes". It can display charging information and energy consumption figures. The navigation system can also suggest routes that include charging stations depending on the remaining charge of the battery, as well as simple destination entry using what3words.

== Models ==
The specifications include:

Model	Years	Power	Torque	0–100 km/h (0–62 mph)	Top speed	Range (WLTP)	Range (EPA)
EQC350; 4MATIC	2019–2023	210 kW (282 hp)	590 N⋅m (435 lb⋅ft)	6.9 s	180 km/h (112 mph)	415 km (258 mi)	354 km (220 mi)
EQC400; 4MATIC	2019–2023	300 kW (402 hp)	760 N⋅m (561 lb⋅ft)	5.1 s	180 km/h (112 mph)	417 km (259 mi)	354 km (220 mi)

== Safety ==
The 2019 EQC received five stars overall in its Euro NCAP test.

Euro NCAP test results Mercedes-Benz EQC 400 4MATIC (2019)
Test	Points	%
Overall:	5 /5 stars	
Adult occupant:	36.6	96%
Child occupant:	44.1	90%
Pedestrian:	36.2	75%
Safety assist:	9.9	75%

ANCAP test results Mercedes-Benz EQC (2019, aligned with Euro NCAP)
Test	Points	%
Overall:	5 /5 stars	
Adult occupant:	36.6	96%
Child occupant:	45.1	92%
Pedestrian:	36.2	75%
Safety assist:	10	76%
