= Mercedes-Benz C-Class Electric =

Battery electric compact luxury sedan

Overview
- Manufacturer: Mercedes-Benz
- Model code: W520
- Production: July 2026 – present
- Assembly: Hungary: Kecskemét (Mercedes-Benz Manufacturing Hungary); China: Beijing (Beijing Benz for L models)
- Designer: Gorden Wagener (head of design)

Body and chassis
- Class: Compact executive car (D)
- Body style: 4-door sedan
- Layout: Rear-motor, rear-wheel-drive (C300 Electric); Dual-motor, all-wheel-drive (C300 4MATIC, 400 4MATIC)
- Platform: MB.EA
- Related: Mercedes-Benz GLC Electric

Powertrain
- Electric motor: 1× or 2× Permanent Magnet Motors
- Power output: 416–483 hp (310–360 kW; 422–490 PS)
- Battery: 85 or 94 kWh Li-NMC
- Electric range: 690–800 km (429–497 mi) (EV, WLTP)

Dimensions
- Wheelbase: 2,962 mm (116.6 in); 3,051 mm (120.1 in) (C-Class L Electric, China)
- Length: 4,883 mm (192.2 in); 4,977 mm (195.9 in) (C-Class L Electric, China)
- Width: 1,892 mm (74.5 in); 1,976 mm (77.8 in) (C-Class L Electric, China)
- Height: 1,503 mm (59.2 in); 1,510 mm (59.4 in) (C-Class L Electric, China)

The Mercedes-Benz C-Class Electric is a battery electric compact executive car manufactured by Mercedes-Benz. Despite the name, it is not related to the internal combustion engine C-Class.

== Overview ==
The C-Class EV was teased during the launch event of the Mercedes-Benz GLC Electric at the 2025 Munich Motor Show, revealing parts of its exterior design, including a similar illuminated grille to that of the GLC Electric.

It officially debuted on 20 April 2026, in one version - the C 400 4MATIC electric. Long-wheelbase models for China will be assembled by Beijing Benz, while the rest of the world will receive models built in Hungary.

Rear view

Interior

=== Design and specifications ===
Similar to the related GLC Electric, the C-Class Electric features an illuminated grille including 1,050 LEDs and an illuminated three-pointed star logo. The profile is described to be "coupe-like", though it still adopts a traditional trunk.

The interior features the optional continuous 39.1-inch "Hyperscreen" display, Burmester sound system, seat heating, ventilation and massage functions, as well as a "Sky Control" panoramic sunroof that includes a dimming feature and 162 illuminated stars. In addition to the 470 L (17 cu ft) trunk, it also features a 107 L (3.8 cu ft) frunk.

The C-Class Electric also rides on the 800-volt "MB.EA" electrical architecture. Up to 497 mi (800 km) of WLTP range and a maximum charging rate of 330 kW, adding 198 mi (319 km) of range in 10 minutes. The airmatic air suspension system is available optionally, with rear-wheel steering that provides 4.5 degrees of opposite steer to reduce the turning circle to 11.2 m (37 ft), and 2.5 degrees of steer in the same direction as the front wheels for stability.
