= Mercedes-Benz GLC Electric =

Battery electric compact luxury crossover SUV

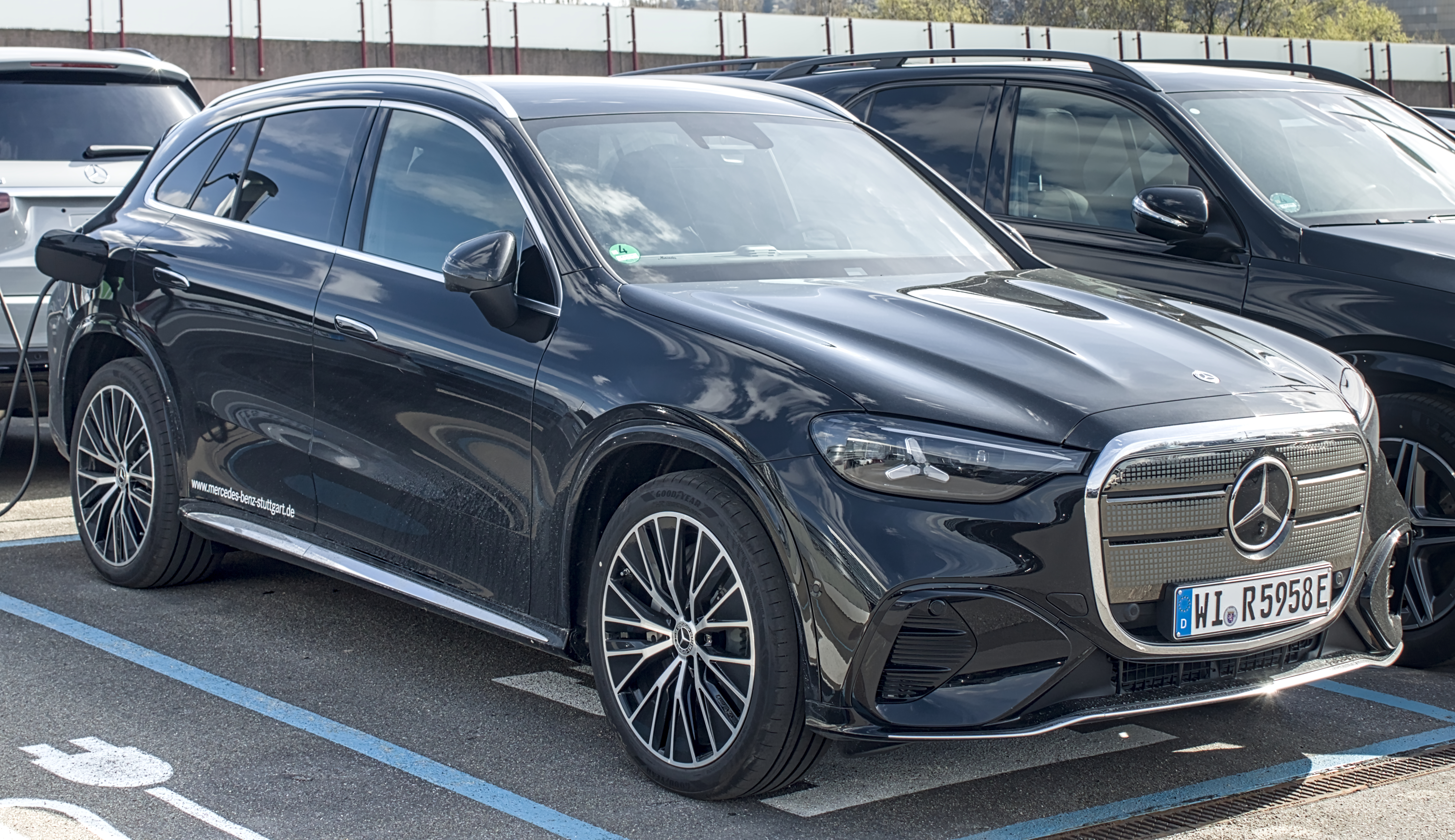

Overview
- Manufacturer: Mercedes-Benz Group
- Model code: X540
- Production: 2026–present
- Assembly: Germany: Bremen; Sindelfingen; China: Beijing (Beijing Benz for L models); India: Pune (Mercedes Benz India); Thailand: Samut Prakan (TAAP)
- Designer: Matthias Schenker and Mayya Markova under Gorden Wagener

Body and chassis
- Class: Compact luxury crossover SUV (D)
- Body style: 5-door SUV
- Layout: Rear-motor, rear-wheel-drive (GLC 250, 300+); Dual-motor, all-wheel-drive (GLC 300 4MATIC, 350L 4MATIC, 400 4MATIC)
- Platform: MB.EA
- Related: Mercedes-Benz C-Class Electric

Powertrain
- Electric motor: 2× permanent magnet motors
- Power output: 349–483 hp (260–360 kW; 354–490 PS)
- Transmission: 2-speed automatic
- Battery: 85 or 94 kWh CATL 800V Li-NMC
- Electric range: Up to 713 km (443 mi) (WLTP); Up to 300 mi (480 km) (EPA)
- Plug-in charging: DC: 320 kW

Dimensions
- Wheelbase: 2,972 mm (117.0 in); 3,027 mm (119.2 in) (GLC L Electric, China)
- Length: 4,845 mm (190.7 in); 4,949 mm (194.8 in) (GLC L Electric, China)
- Width: 1,913 mm (75.3 in); 1,970 mm (77.6 in) (GLC L Electric, China)
- Height: 1,644 mm (64.7 in); 1,710 mm (67.3 in) (GLC L Electric, China)

Chronology
- Predecessor: Mercedes-Benz EQC

The Mercedes-Benz GLC Electric (X540) is a battery electric compact luxury crossover SUV manufactured by Mercedes-Benz. Although it shares its name with the internal combustion engine GLC (X254, C254), it is not related to it.

== Overview ==
The GLC Electric debuted at the 2025 Munich Motor Show as one variant only - the GLC 400 4MATIC electric. The Chinese produced long wheelbase variant was unveiled later and carries the GLC 350L designation.

It features an 800-volt electrical architecture with a 94.0 kWh battery with up to 443 miles (713 km) of WLTP range. It is capable of charging at 330 kW, adding 303 km (180 miles) of WLTP range in 10 minutes.

The GLC 400 4MATIC electric features a dual-motor all-wheel-drive setup outputting 483 hp (360 kW; 490 PS), which is equipped with a two-speed transmission on the rear axle only.

Airmatic suspension borrowed from the S-Class is optional. In addition, it also features a new "Car-to-X" function that changes damping based on upcoming road conditions, as well as an integration with Google Maps data to determine the optimum height for maximum efficiency.

The dashboard contains a new version of the MBUX Hyperscreen, now an optional continuous dashboard-spanning 39.1-inch display with local dimming. It serves as the digital instrument cluster, central infotainment touchscreen, and passenger entertainment display. The center console features two wireless charging pads bordered by a single row of physical buttons. The vehicle is equipped with a 4-cubic-foot (110 L) frunk.

On November 4, 2026, Mercedes-Benz launched the locally assembled GLC Electric in India in the 400 4Matic trim, priced at ₹78.50 lakh (ex-showroom). Built on a dedicated 400V electric architecture, it features a 94 kWh battery with a WLTP range of 711 km, dual electric motors generating 490 hp, and a 39.1-inch single-piece hyperscreen dashboard .

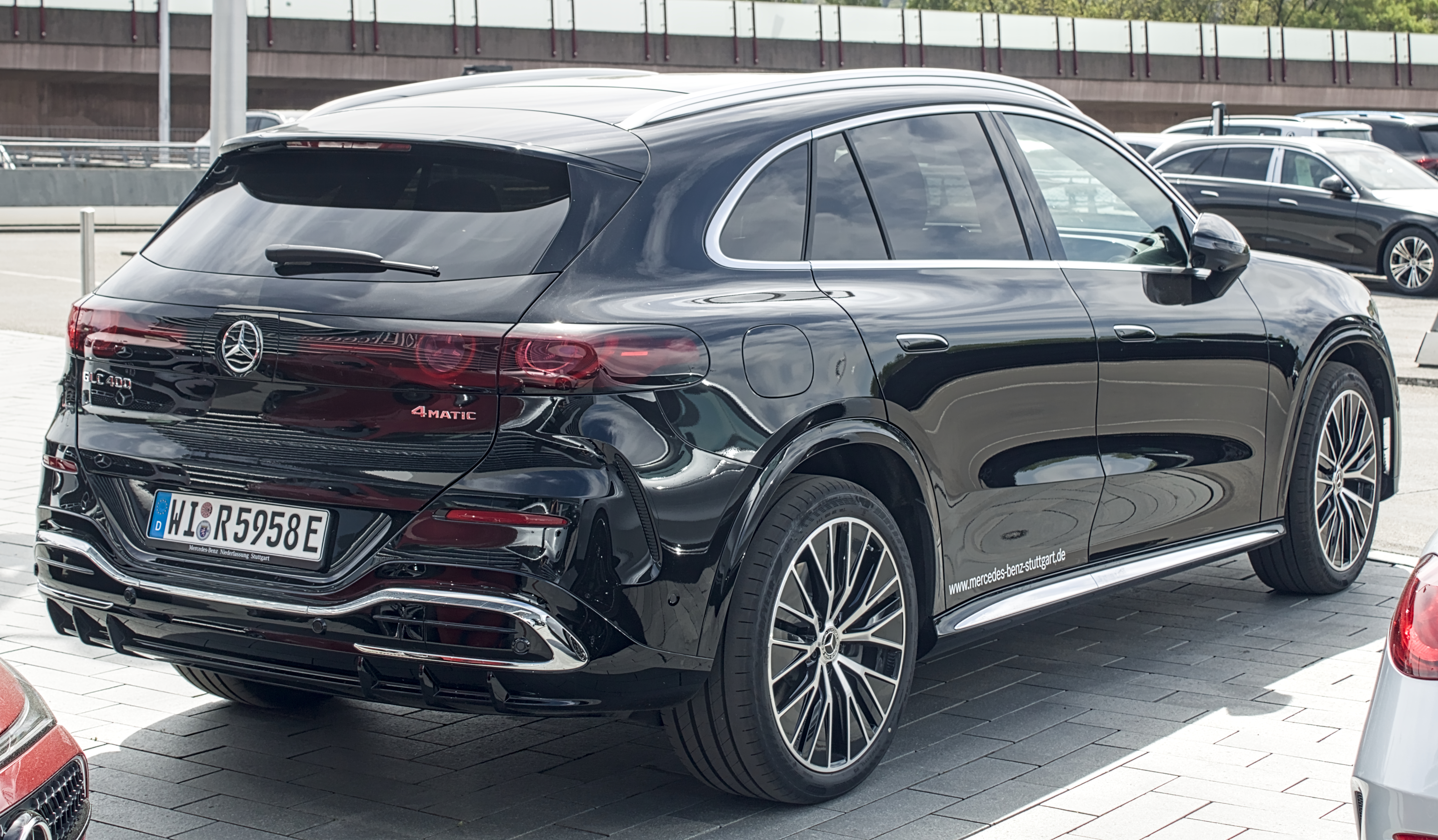
Rear view

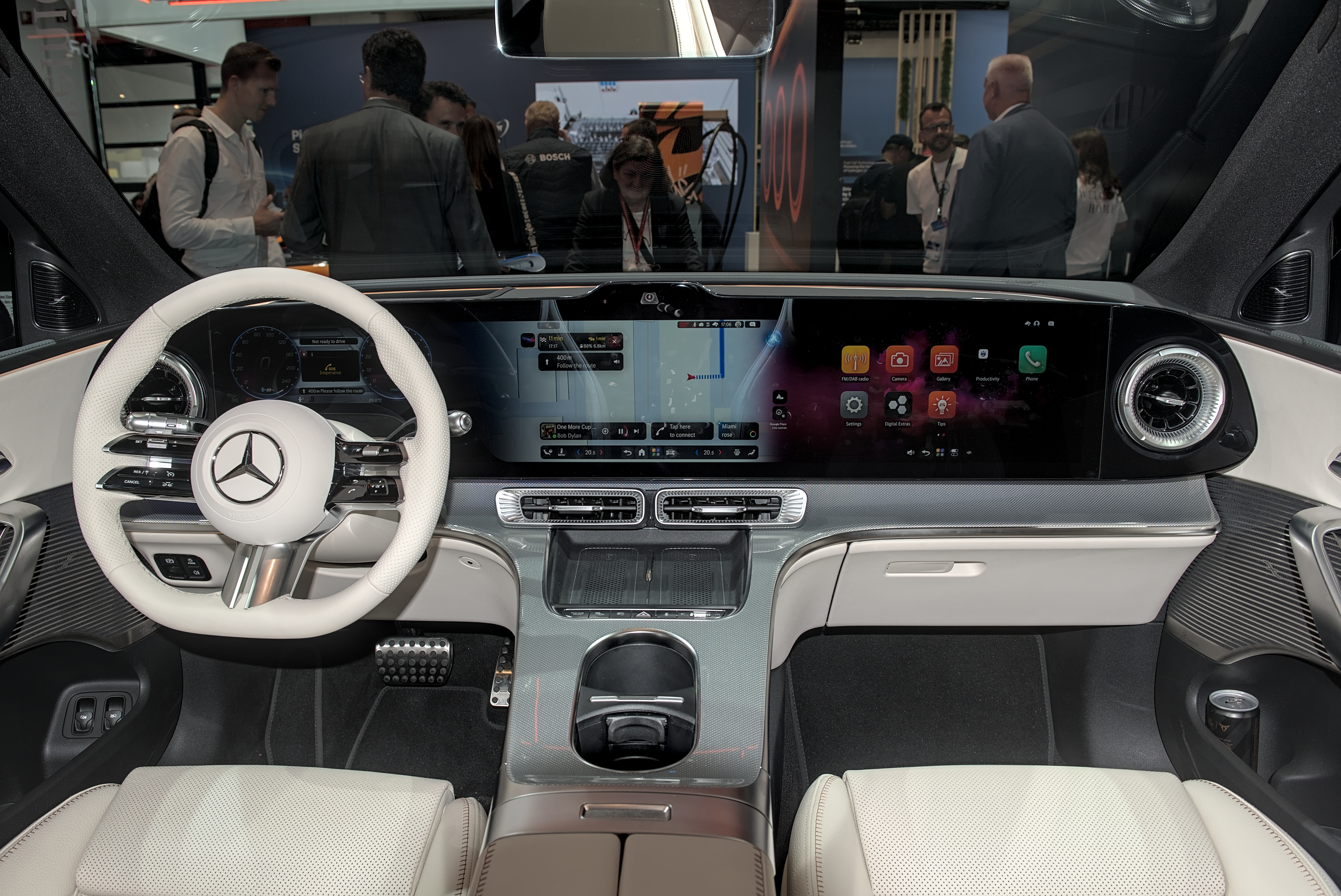
Interior

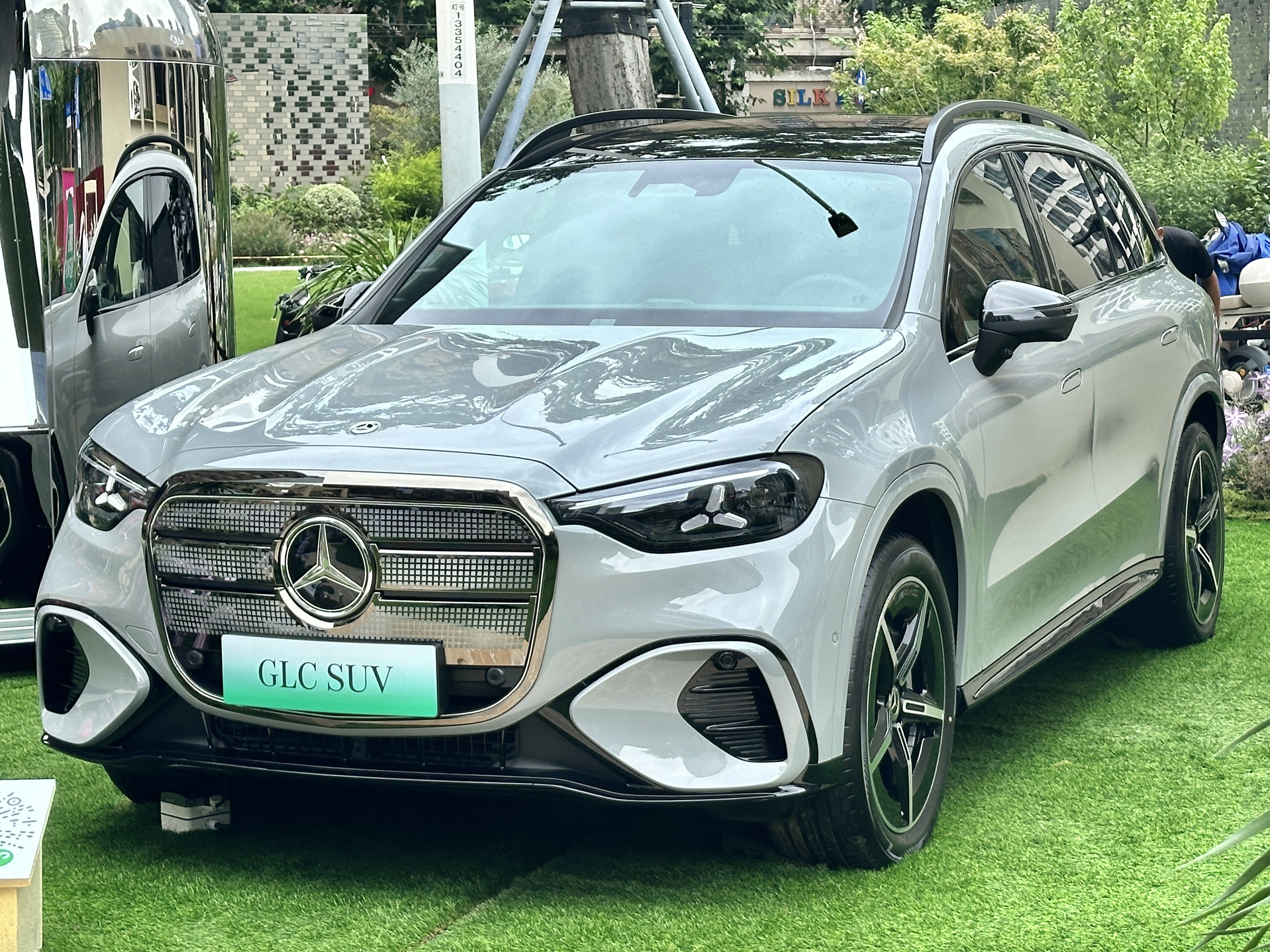
Mercedes-Benz GLC 350L Electric

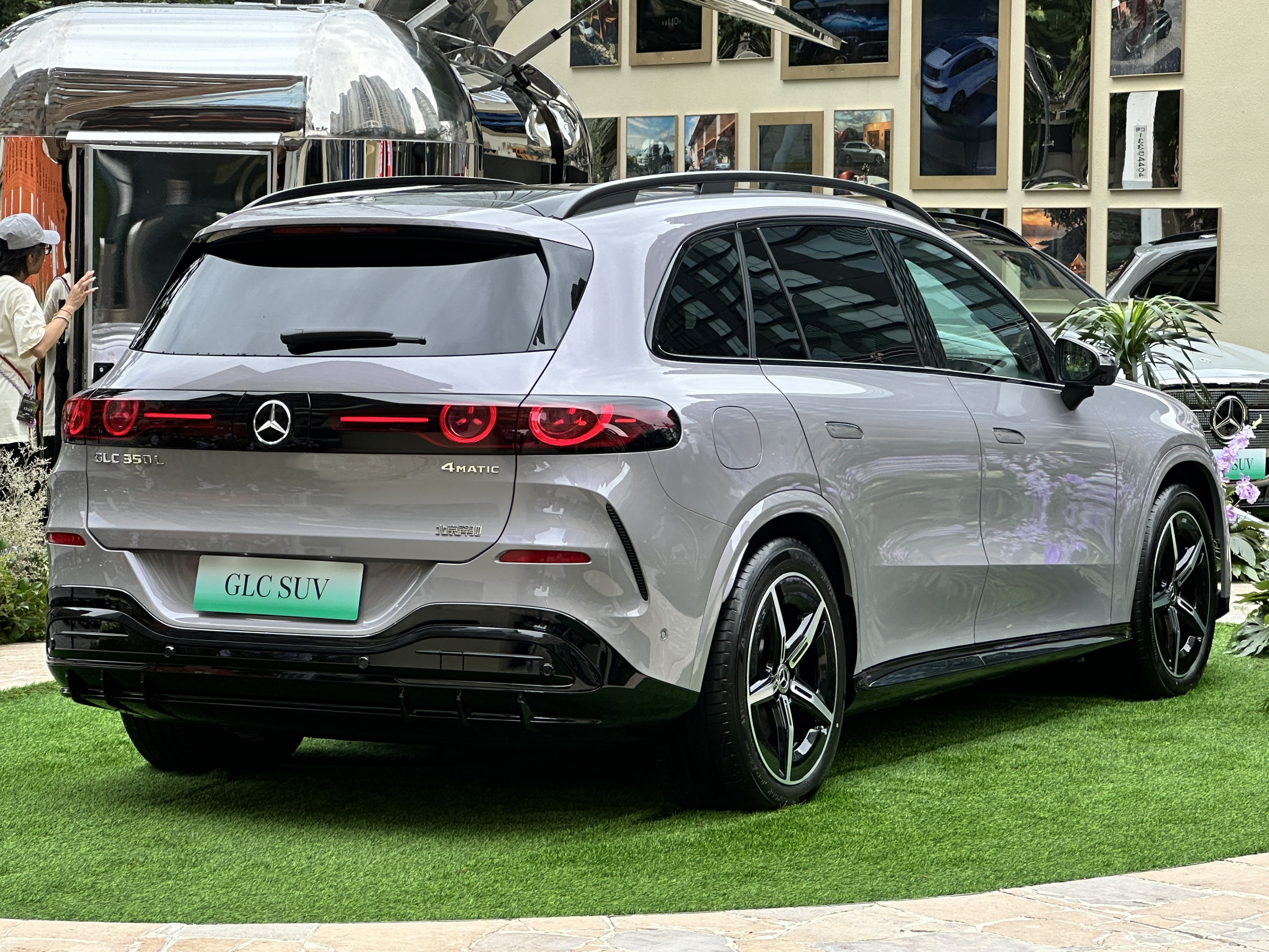
Rear view
