= List of automobiles manufactured by Beijing Jeep Corporation =

This is a list of automobiles manufactured by Beijing Jeep Corporation, a company that now goes under the name Beijing Benz:

- BJ212/BJ2020
- Jeep BJ2021/7250 Cherokee (based on the Jeep Cherokee (XJ), this was the original vehicle produced by Beijing Jeep from 1983 to 2005)
- Jeep 2500/2700 the Jeep_Cherokee_(XJ built in China after the MB takeover of Chrysler Jeep
- Chrysler Sebring JS
- Chrysler 300C
- Jeep 4000/4700 (Jeep Grand Cherokee)
- BJ2022 Brave Warrior (military vehicle)
- Mitsubishi Pajero Sport
- Mitsubishi Outlander

Since the 2014 sales of Chrysler and Jeep to FIAT, the Jeep-like vehicles and their derivatives have been produced by the BAIC subsidiary Beijing Automobile Works Co., Ltd. (BAW).
