= Beijing Benz =

Automotive manufacturing company

Beijing Benz Automotive Co., Ltd.

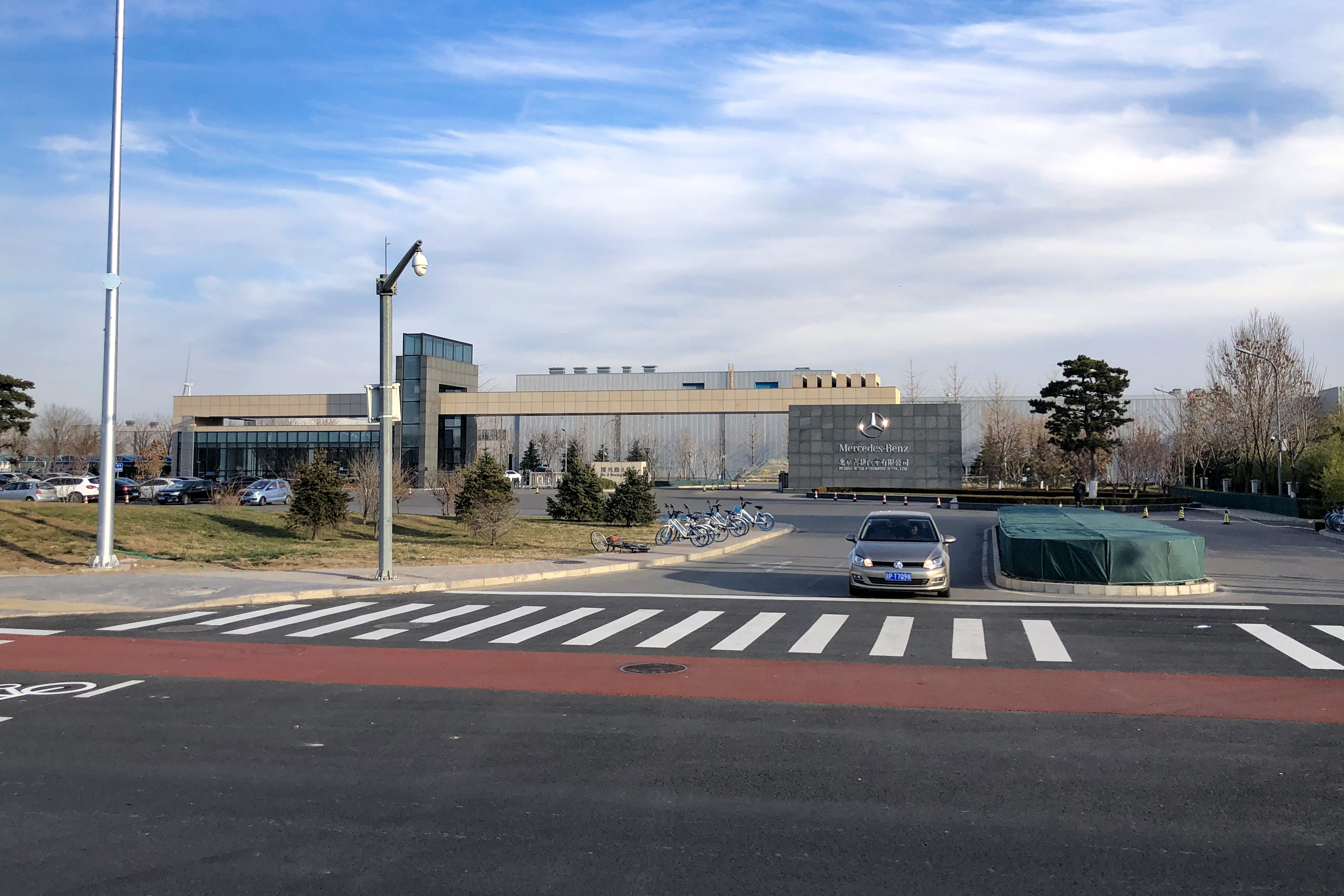
- Headquarters in Daxing District, Beijing
- Type: Joint venture
- Industry: Automotive
- Founded: August 8, 2005; 21 years ago
- Headquarters: Beijing, China
- Area served: China
- Key people: Arno van der Merwe (CEO)
- Products: Automobiles
- Owner: BAIC Motor (51%); Mercedes-Benz Group (38.665%); Mercedes-Benz China (10.335%)
- Number of employees: 20,000 total
- Website: bbac.com.cn

Beijing Benz
- Simplified Chinese: 北京奔驰
- Traditional Chinese: 北京奔馳
- Literal meaning: Beijing Benz
Transcriptions
Standard Mandarin
- Hanyu Pinyin: Běijīng Bēnchí
- Wade–Giles: Pei^{3}-ching^{1} Pen^{1}-ch'ih^{2}
- IPA: [pèɪ̯tɕíŋ pəntʂʰɨ]
Yue: Cantonese
- Yale Romanization: Bākgīng Bānchìh
- Jyutping: Bak1 ging1 ban1 ci4

Beijing Benz Automotive Co., Ltd. is an automotive manufacturing company headquartered in Beijing, China, and a joint venture between BAIC Motor and Mercedes-Benz Group.

It was initially established in January 1984 as a joint venture between the Beijing Automotive Engineering Company (BAECO) and American Motors Corporation (AMC) of Michigan, USA, and was therefore named Beijing Jeep Corporation (Chinese: 北京吉普汽车有限公司). It was the first Chinese auto-making joint venture with a Western partner. The joint venture was unaffected by Chrysler's acquisition of AMC in 1987, Chrysler's merger with German automaker Daimler-Benz AG in 1998, and continued after DaimlerChrysler AG sold its Chrysler division to Cerberus in 2007.

== History ==
The history of this company goes back to Beijing Jeep Corporation (BJC), which was the first Sino-foreign automobile joint venture in China. It became a prototype for future cooperative projects and BJC became a test case revealing problems, both political and economic, that would appear for other investors the Chinese hoped to attract.

The current name, Beijing Benz, was established in 2005, and the enterprise is now owned by Beiqi and Mercedes-Benz Group (formerly Daimler AG).

=== American Motors ===
Beijing Benz grew out of what was originally the Beijing Jeep Corporation (Chinese: 北京吉普汽车有限公司), China's first Sino-western automotive joint venture having been established in 1984 with American Motors Corporation.

American Motors began negotiations in 1979 to sell its vehicles in China and gain access to then low-cost Chinese labor. The Chinese wanted more-modern automotive technology; Beijing Jeep suited the needs of both parties and produced the American Motors Jeep Cherokee (XJ) in Beijing. While talks began in the late 1970s, operation started in 1985. The initial investment by AMC was $8 million. Assembly of the Cherokee continued after Chrysler purchased American Motors as did production of the classic Beijing BJ212-based SUVs.

Beijing Jeep has since become well known as an example of early foreign direct investment in China. Its pitfalls and successes are pored over in case studies, and such academic reports sometimes compare the marketing strategy of Beijing Jeep with that of Shanghai Volkswagen, another early Sino-foreign joint venture.

=== Chrysler ===
When Chrysler purchased American Motors in 1987, its Jeep brand came with an unexpected boon, Beijing Jeep. A few Chrysler models were subsequently added to the Chinese company's product line including the Jeep Grand Cherokee, Mitsubishi Pajero Sport, and the Mitsubishi Outlander, as well as some Beijing Jeep-branded, locally developed vehicles. Chrysler no longer had any ownership in Beijing Jeep as of early 2009 due to the failure of its attempt to acquire the maker of Mercedes-Benz models. That German company, Daimler, kept the profitable China manufacturing operation for itself once it was clear the merger was a failed prospect. Domestic manufacture of Jeep-branded vehicles ceased in 2006. Newer Jeep models are now being produced at a joint venture between Guangzhou Automobile Group and Fiat Chrysler Automobiles, current owner of the Chrysler and Jeep brands, however.

=== Daimler AG ===
During Chrysler's short-lived partnership with Daimler AG, maker of Mercedes-Benz cars, production at Beijing Jeep was expanded to include Mercedes-Benz-branded products. Its legal name was changed to Beijing Benz-DaimlerChrysler Automotive Co Ltd, with then German Chancellor Gerhard Schröder in attendance at the 2004 naming ceremony. While Chrysler was removed from the company in 2009, it remained in its legal name for several more years.

Mercedes-Benz had first entered Chinese production through a short-lived venture with FAW (First Automobile Works), which assembled 828 Mercedes-Benz W123 200 and 230E sedans in Changchun beginning in 1988, most of them from CKD kits. The cars did not prove popular. A few dozen of the long-wheelbase 230E Lang (V123) were among the cars assembled.

Beijing Benz was established in August 2005, reintroducing Mercedes-Benz production to China, and assembled its first car, a Mercedes-Benz E-Class, in December 2005.

The company started producing the Mercedes-Benz E-Class locally in 2006 and the C-Class in 2008. Manufacture of Chrysler-branded models continued until at least 2008. This included the 300C and Sebring, which were both locally produced and imported.

Prior to 2010, the E-Class was assembled from knock-down kits with a low localization rate of about 30%.

In 2017, Beijing Benz began manufacturing 58% of the parts for the Mercedes-Benz GLA, Mercedes-Benz GLB and Mercedes-Benz GLC in China for those parts to be exported afterwards for assembly.

As well as Beijing, there is also a subsidiary in Fuzhou, Fujian under the name Fujian Benz established in 2007 where they have produced light commercial vehicles such as the Vito since April 2011 and the Sprinter in November 2011. The Viano commenced in the same month as the Vito and ended production in April 2015. The V-Class was launched in March 2016.

Since the 2014 sales of Chrysler and Jeep to FIAT, the Jeep-like vehicles and their derivatives have been produced by the BAIC subsidiary Beijing Automobile Works Co., Ltd. (BAW).

As of 2016, Beijing Benz assembles and manufactures the Mercedes-Benz E-Class (long wheelbase), and C-Class in China.

== Operations ==
Beijing Benz has a production base at the Beijing Economic & Technological Development Area. Another plant opened in 2010. This opening may have increased potential Beijing Benz production capacity to 300,000 units/year. Such unit counts may consider engines and automobiles as discrete. An engine-making production base was scheduled to become operational in 2013.

Beijing Benz does not produce all the Mercedes-branded autos sold on the Chinese market. Some Mercedes offerings, the S-Class for example, are imported by Mercedes-Benz (China) Ltd.

As of 2009, Beijing Benz products, alongside those of several other makes, are purchased for use by Chinese State officials such as ministers and provincial heads.

Sales in 2010 were expected to reach 50,000 cars, but total Mercedes-Benz sales in China including imports were near 150,000. In 2008, Beijing Benz's production capacity was estimated at 100,000 units/year although that figure may consider engines and vehicles as discrete, and the company was likely able to produce only half that number of whole vehicles.

== Models ==
=== Current production ===
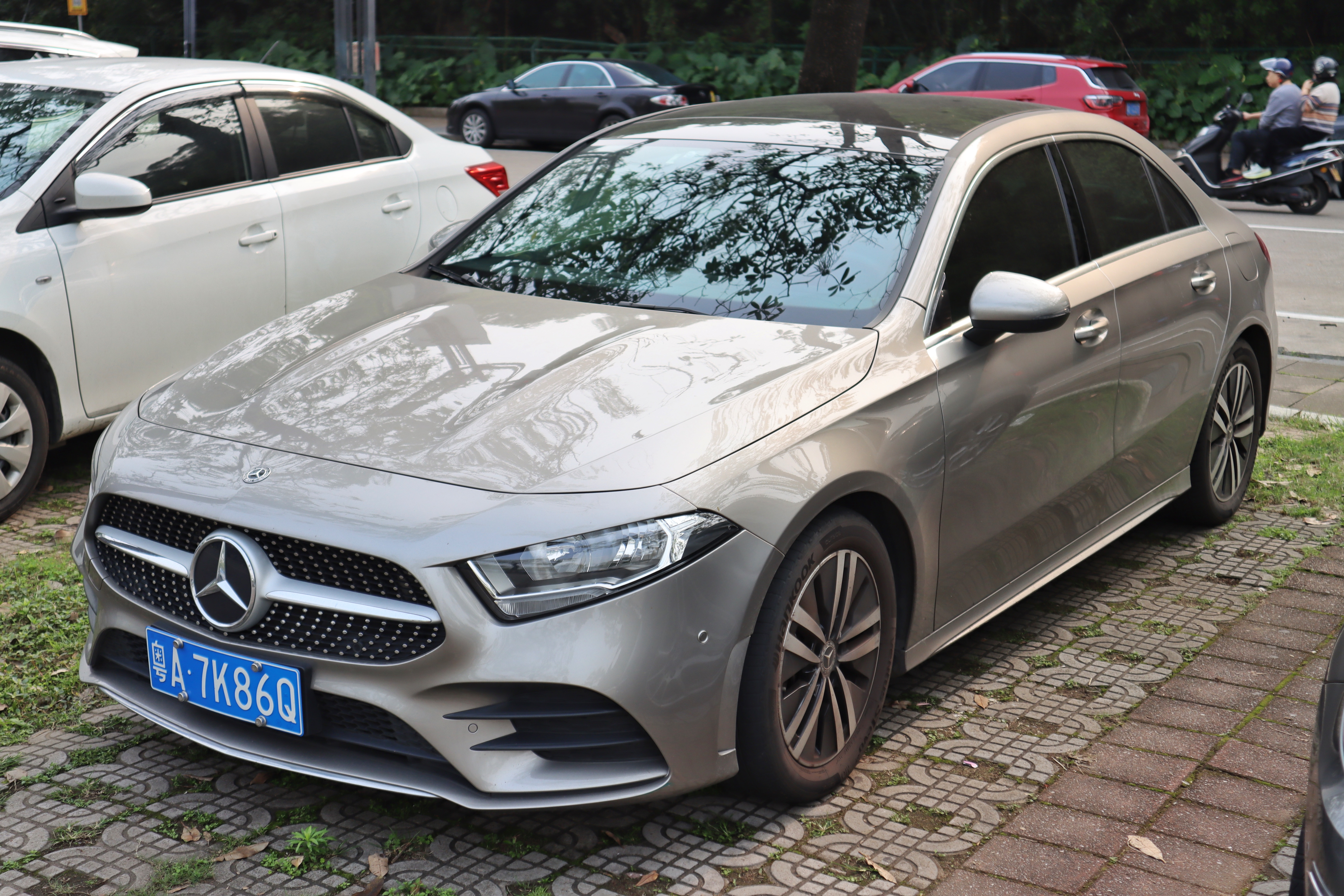
2019–present
梅赛德斯-奔驰A级Z177
Mercedes-Benz A-Class Z177

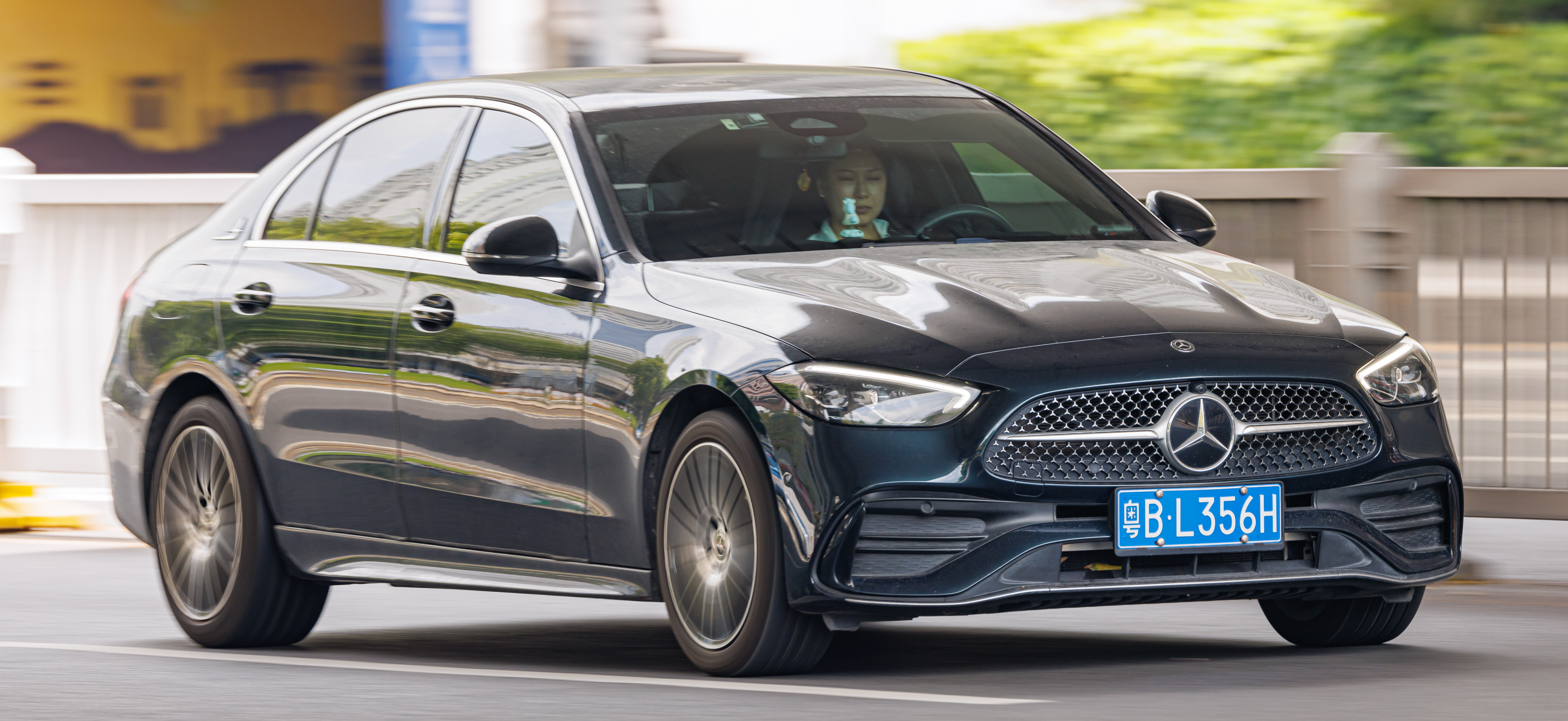
2021–present
梅赛德斯-奔驰C级W206
Mercedes-Benz C-Class W206

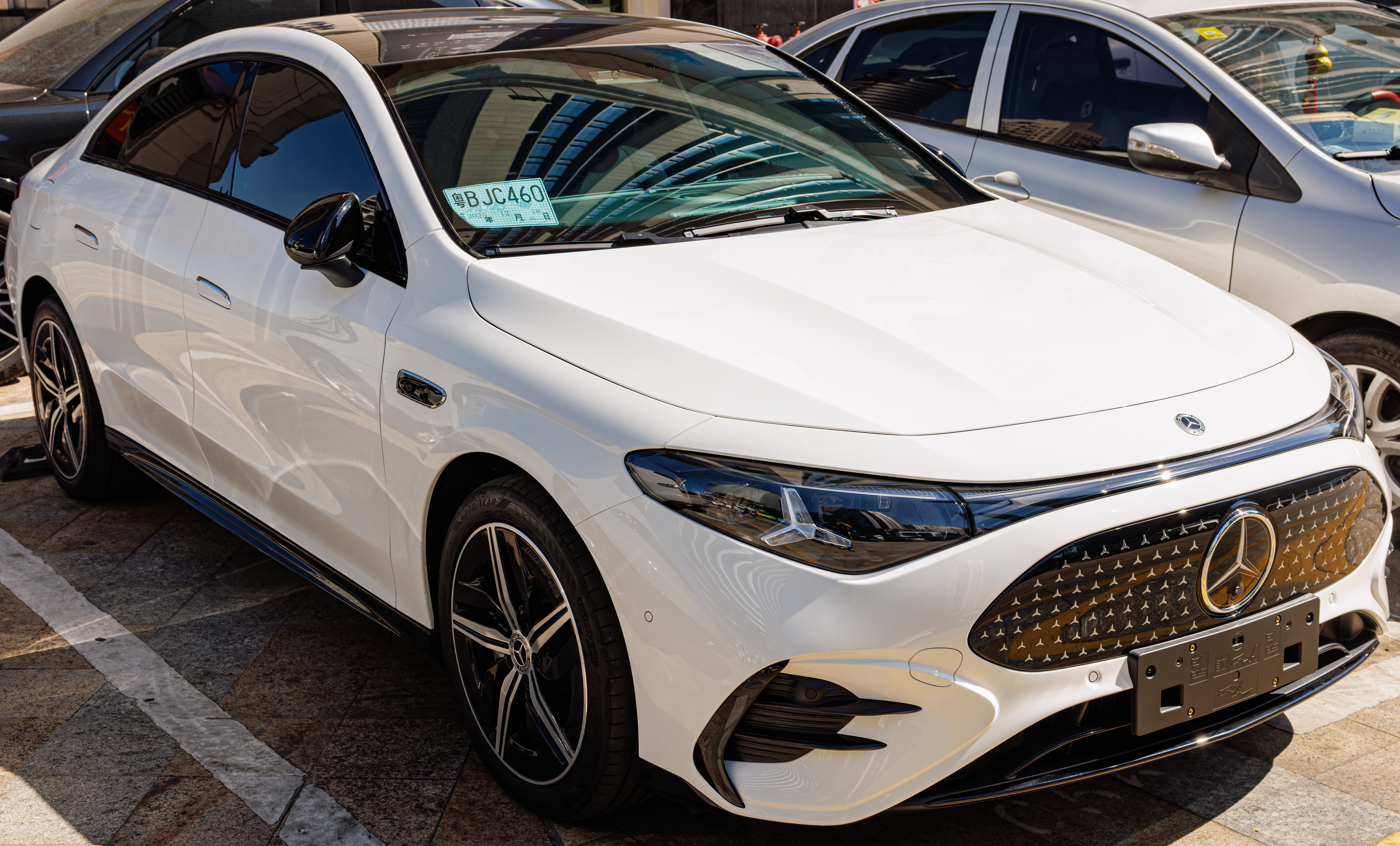
2025–present
梅赛德斯-奔驰纯电CLA
Mercedes-Benz Electric CLA L

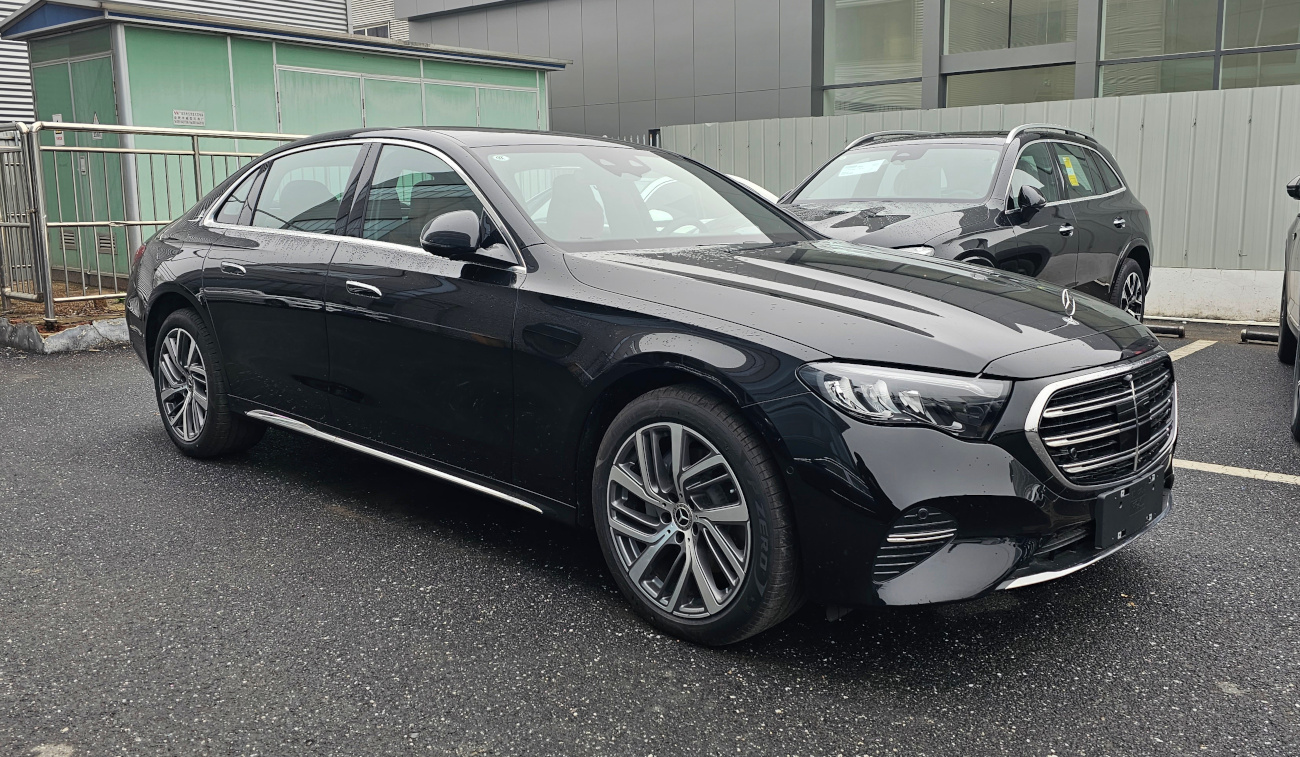
2023–present
梅赛德斯-奔驰E级V214
Mercedes-Benz E-Class V214

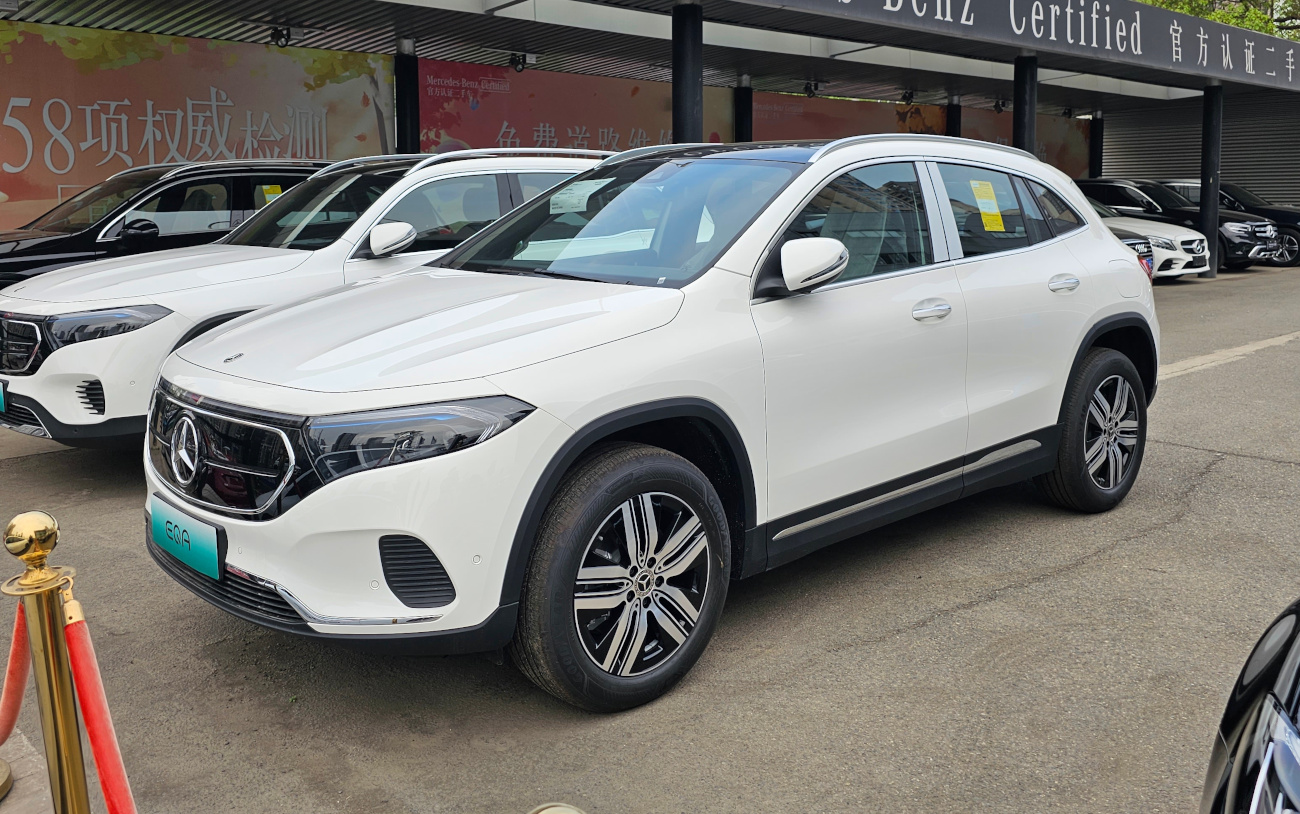
2021–present
梅赛德斯-奔驰EQA
Mercedes-Benz EQA

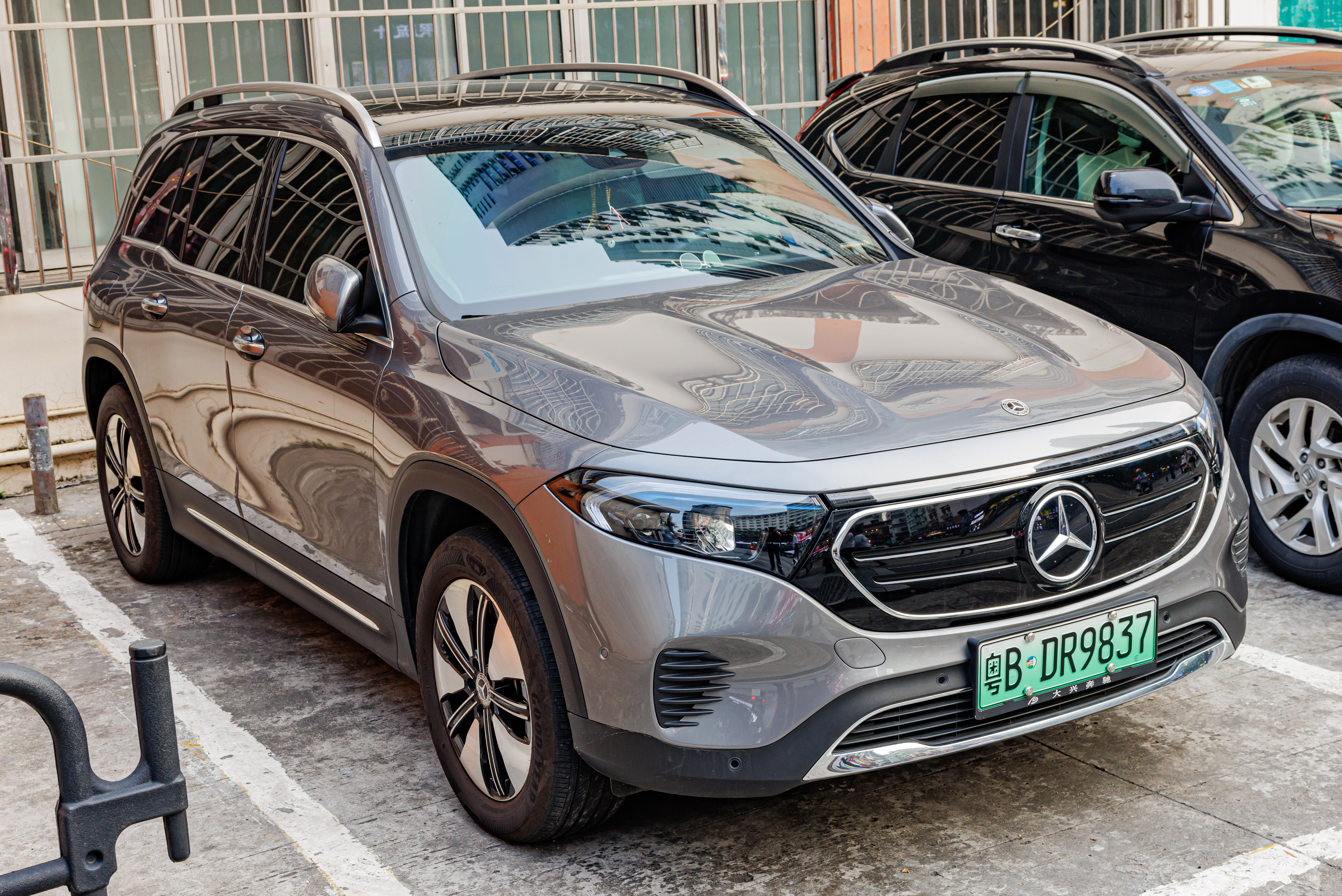
2021–present
梅赛德斯-奔驰EQB
Mercedes-Benz EQB

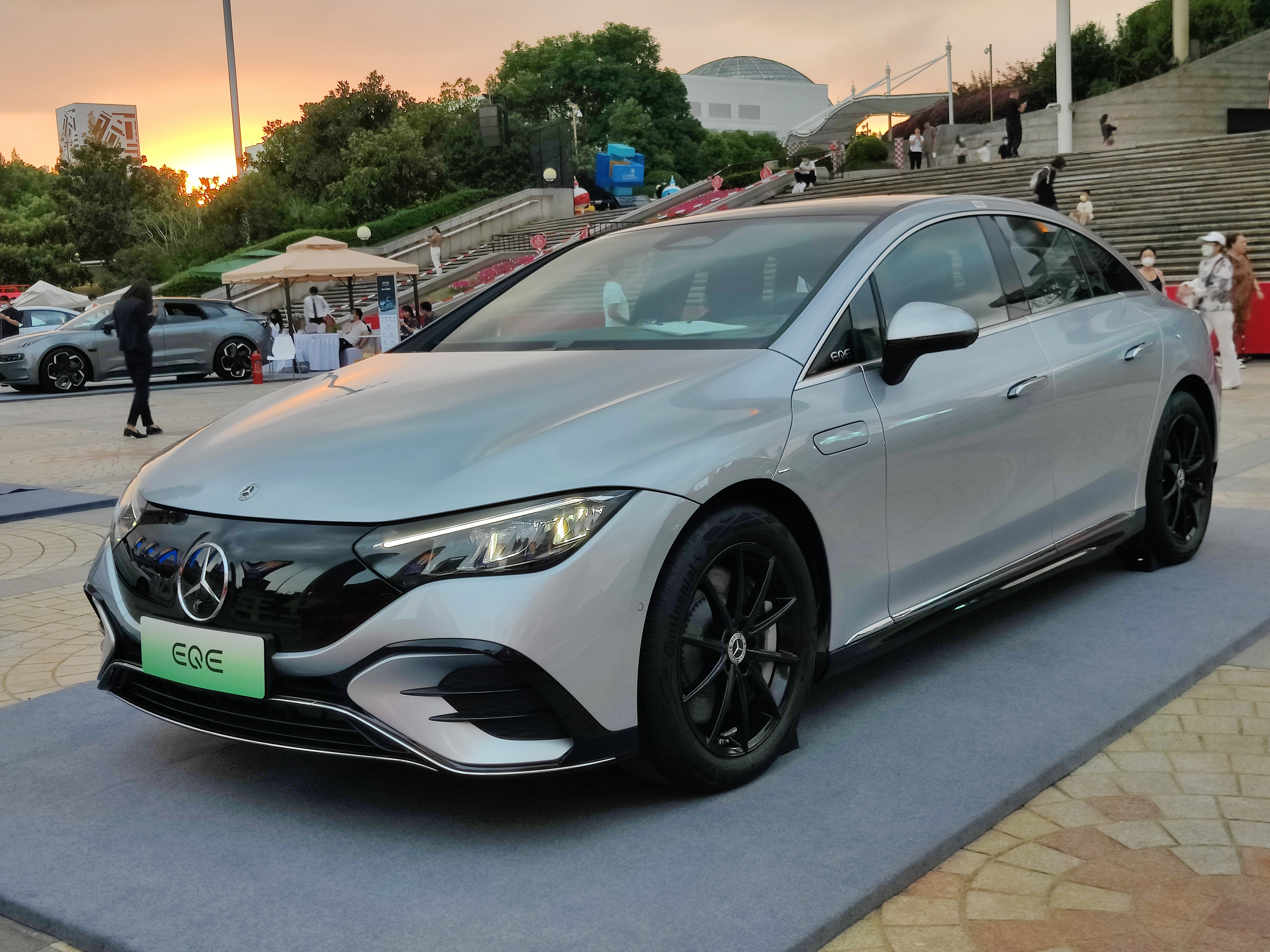
2022–present
梅赛德斯-奔驰EQE
Mercedes-Benz EQE

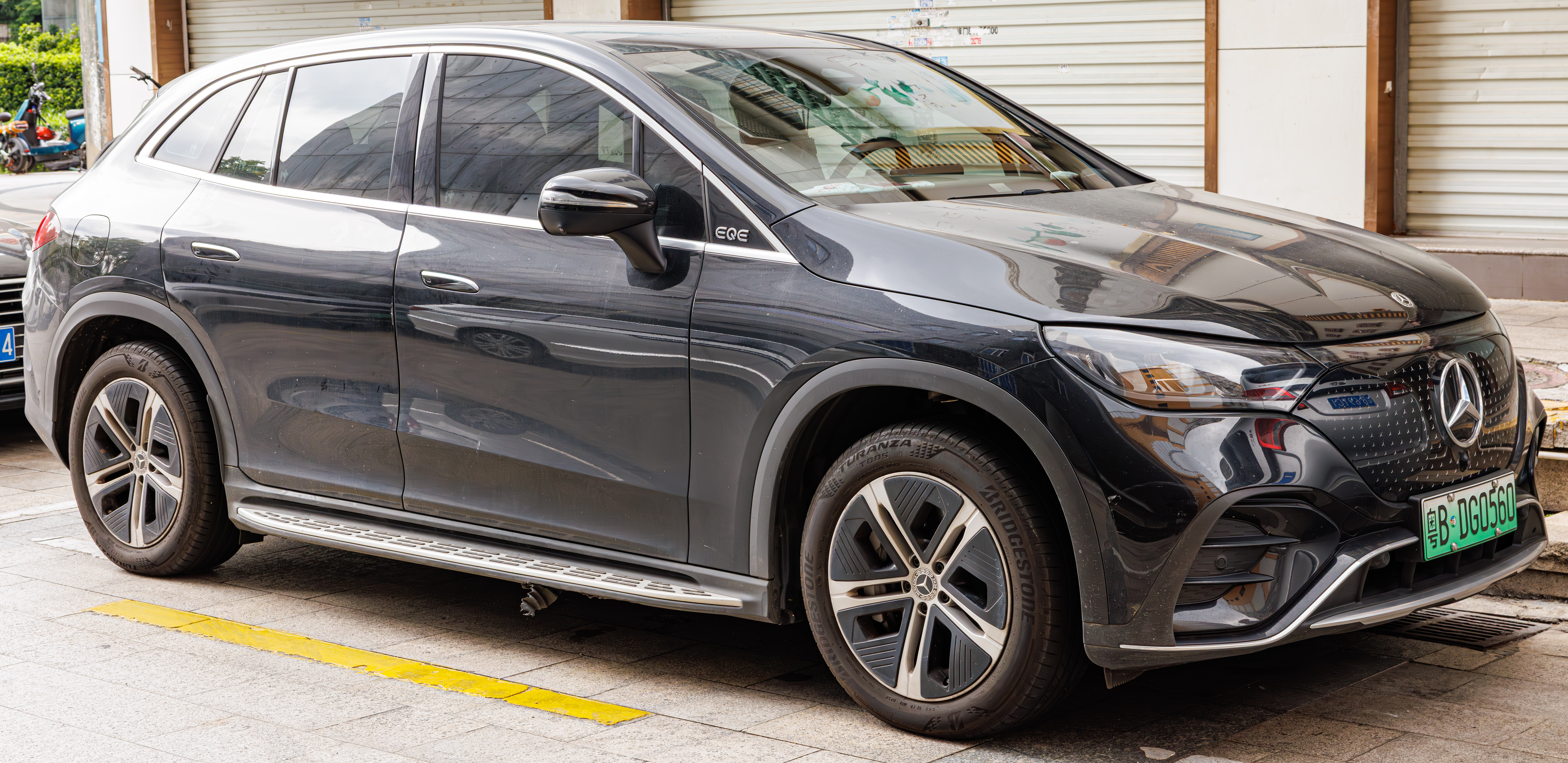
2023–present
梅赛德斯-奔驰EQE SUV
Mercedes-Benz EQE SUV

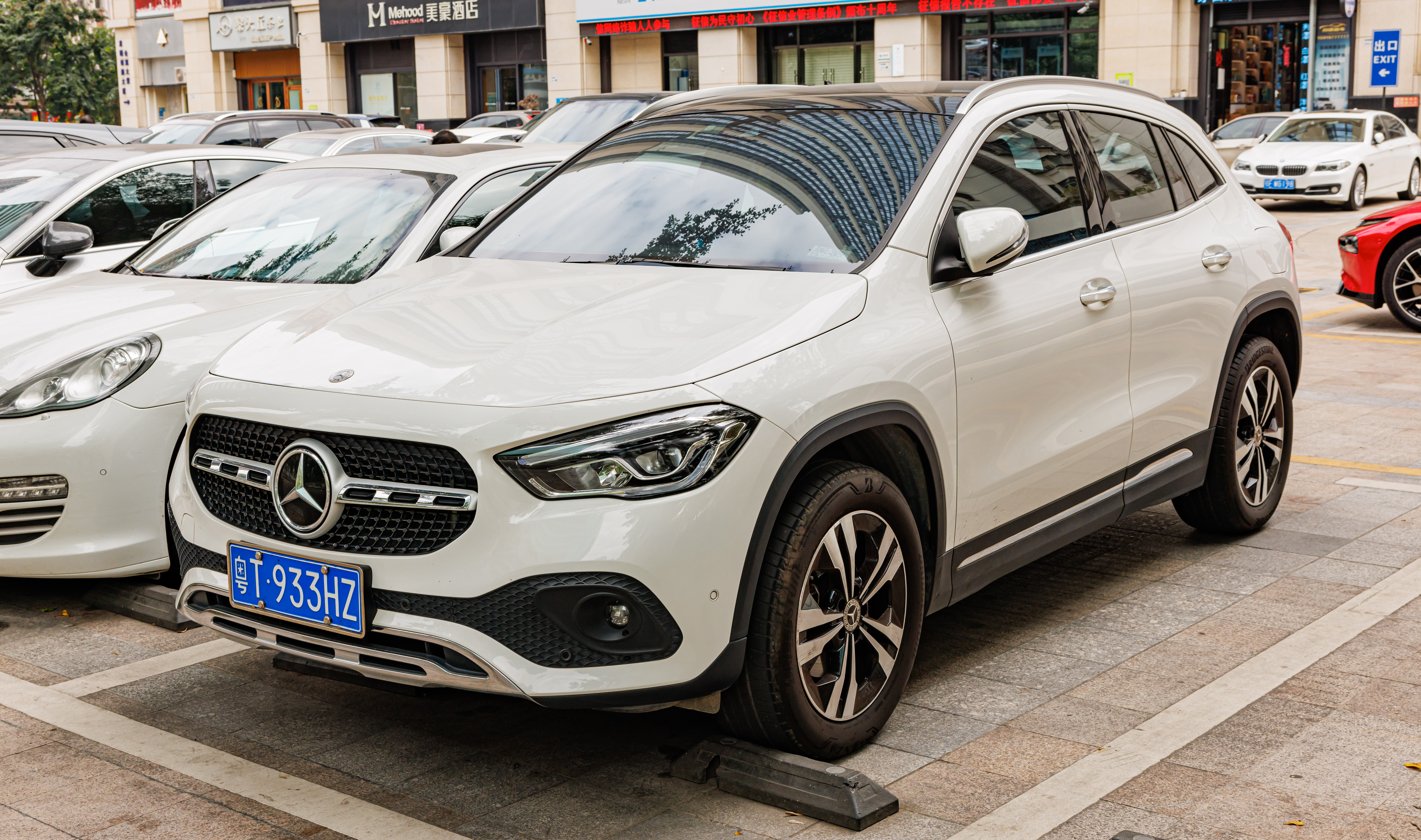
2020–present
梅赛德斯-奔驰GLA H247
Mercedes-Benz GLA H247

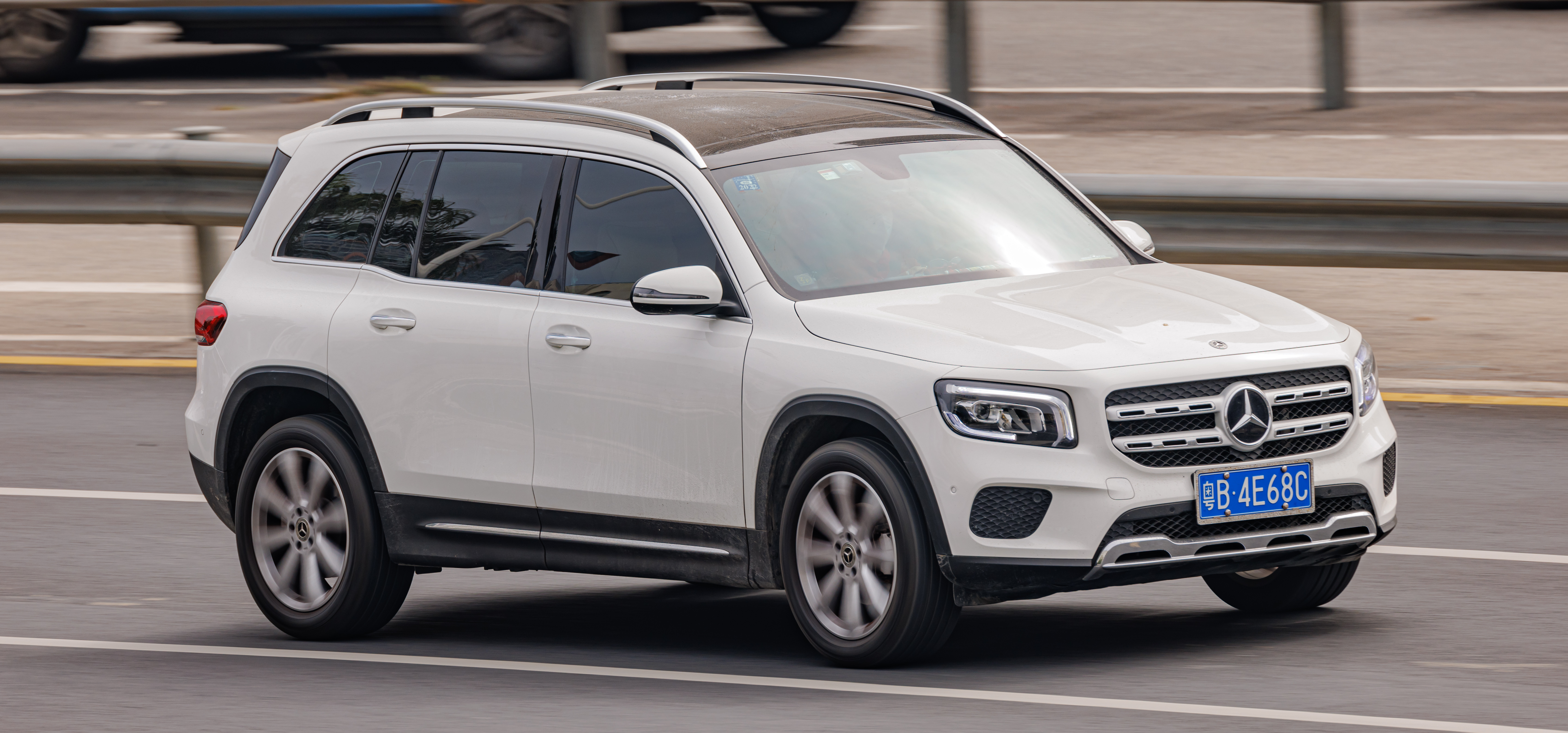
2019–present
梅赛德斯-奔驰GLB
Mercedes-Benz GLB

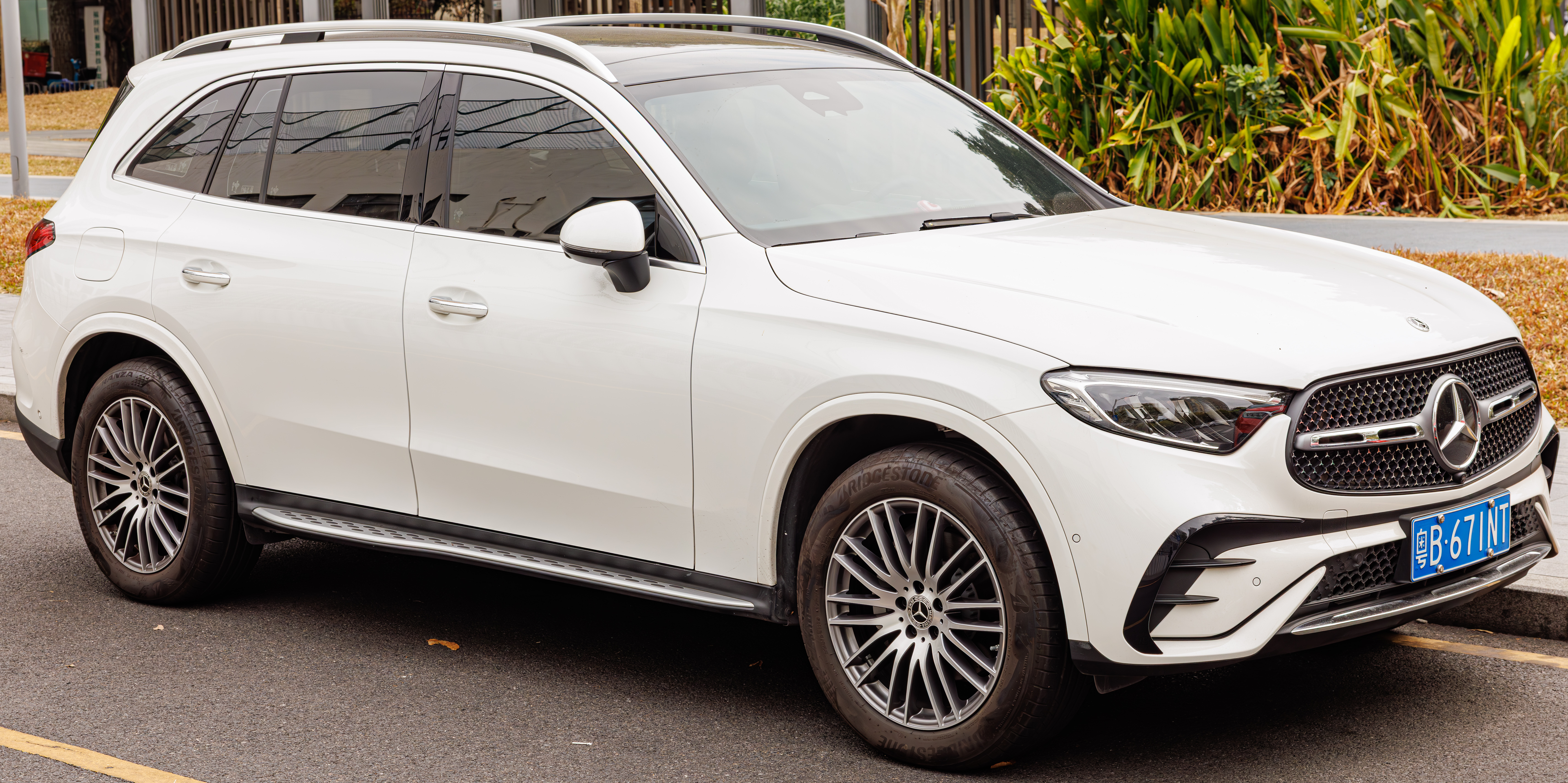
2022–present
梅赛德斯-奔驰GLC
Mercedes-Benz GLC X254

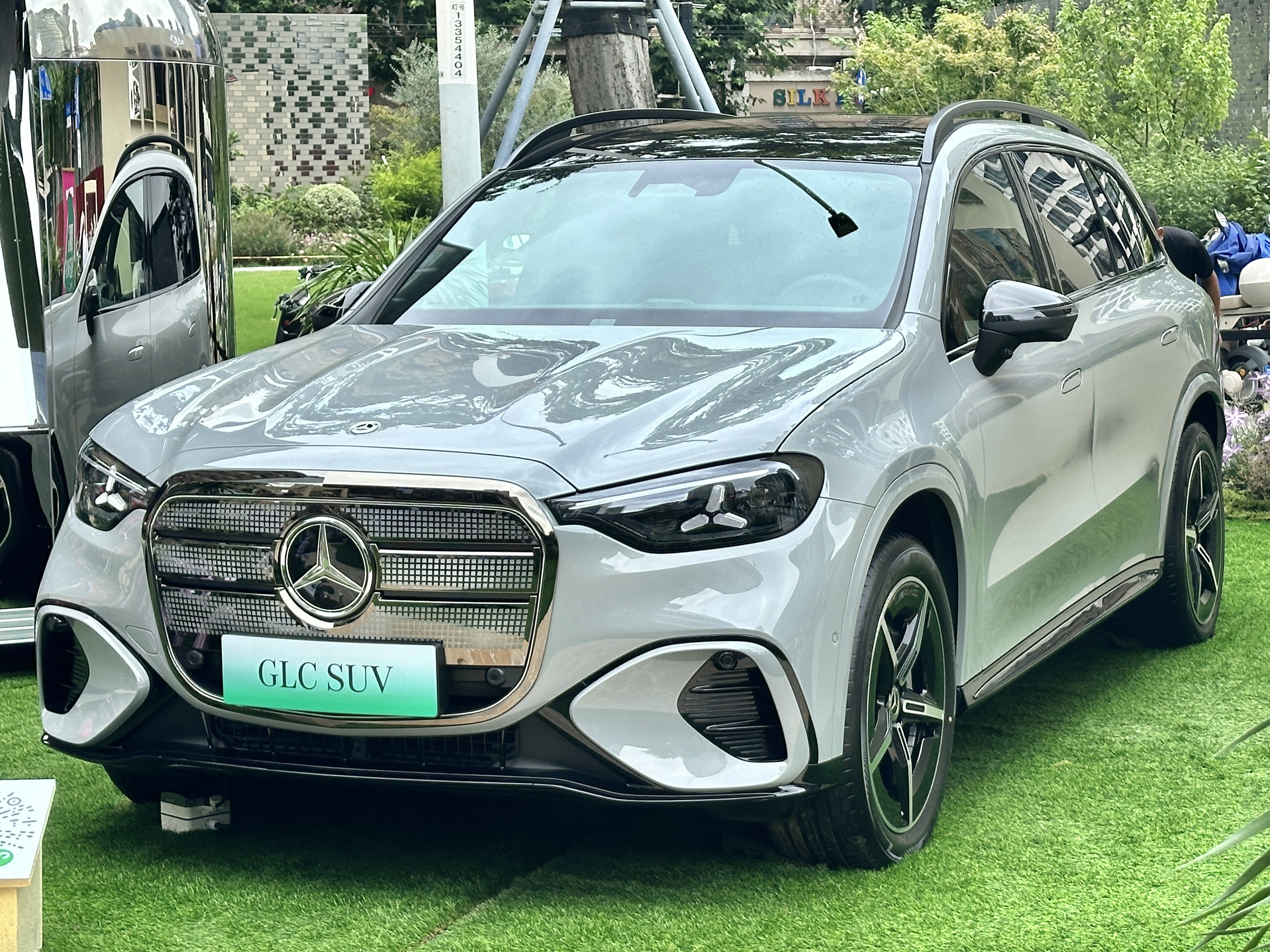
2026–present
梅赛德斯-奔驰纯电GLC
Mercedes-Benz Electric GLC

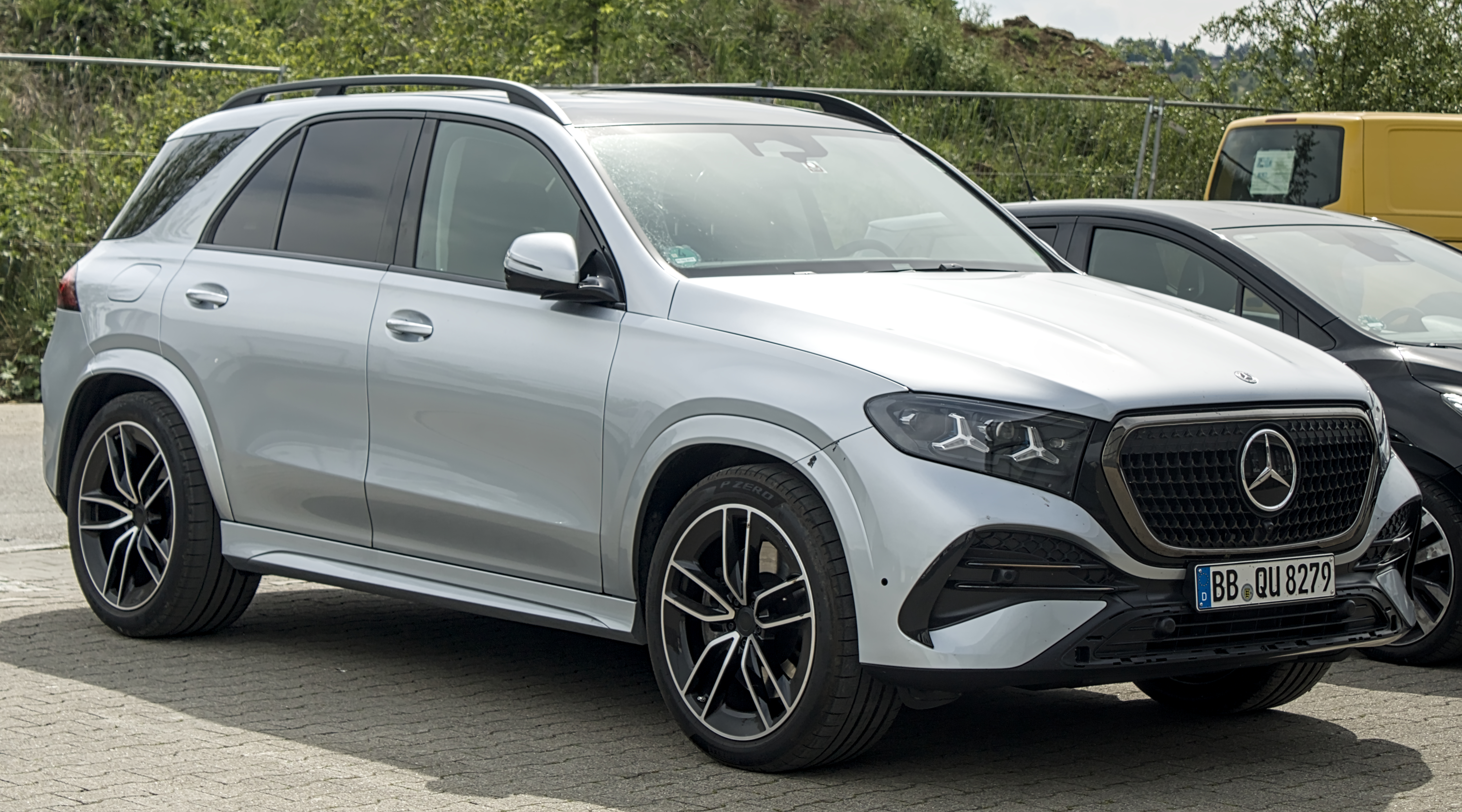
2026–present
梅赛德斯-奔驰GLE
Mercedes-Benz GLE

=== Former production (Beijing Jeep) ===
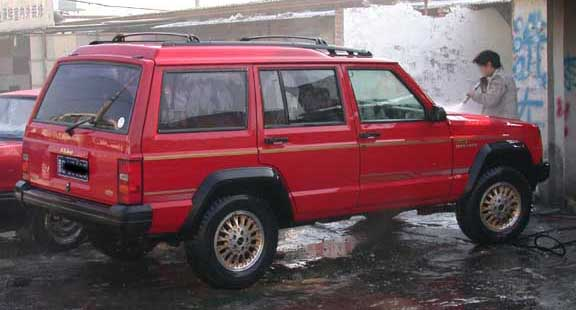
1984–2005
北京BJ213/2021/7250
Beijing BJ213/2021/BJ7250

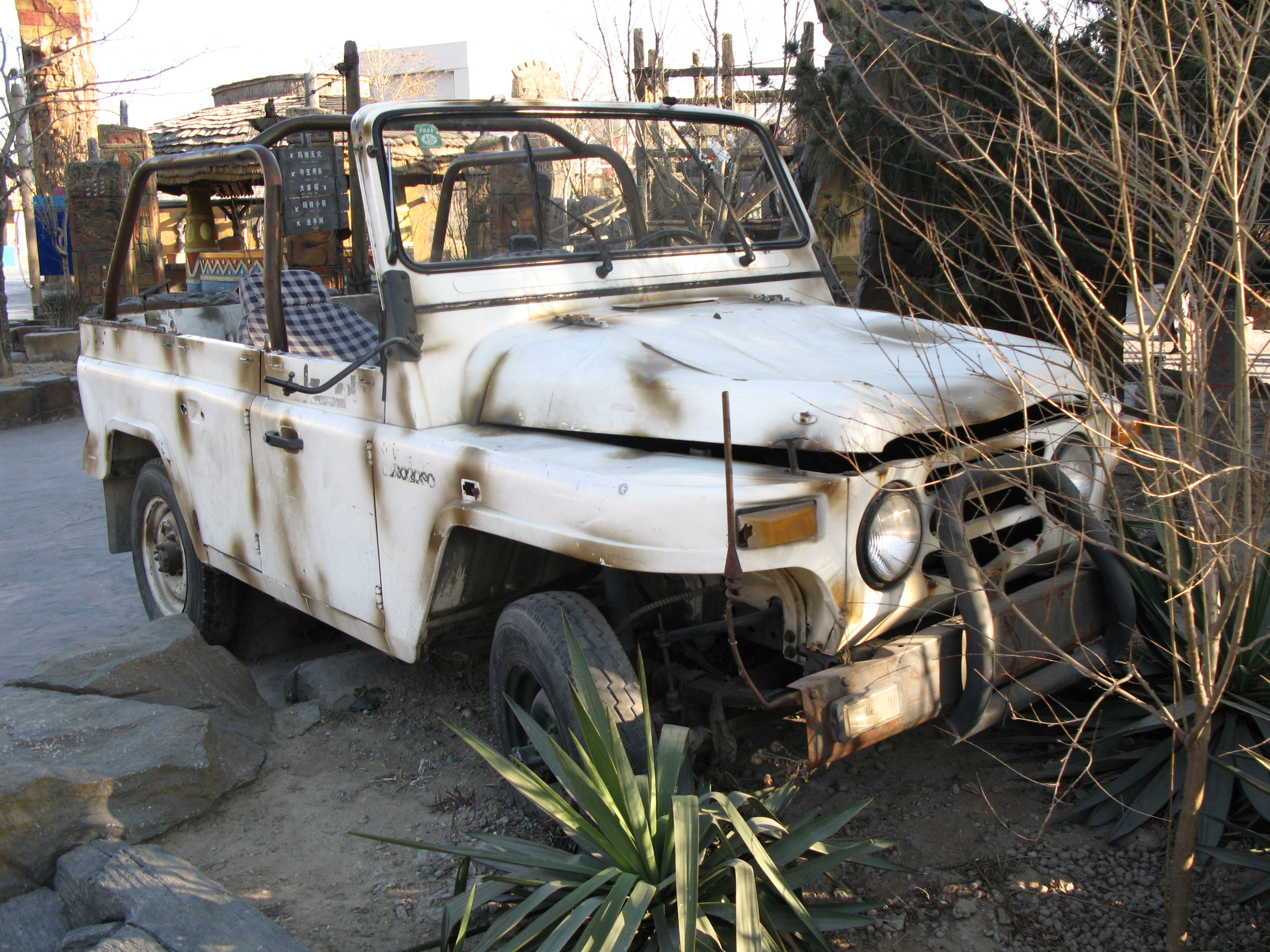
1984–2005
北京BJ212
Beijing BJ212

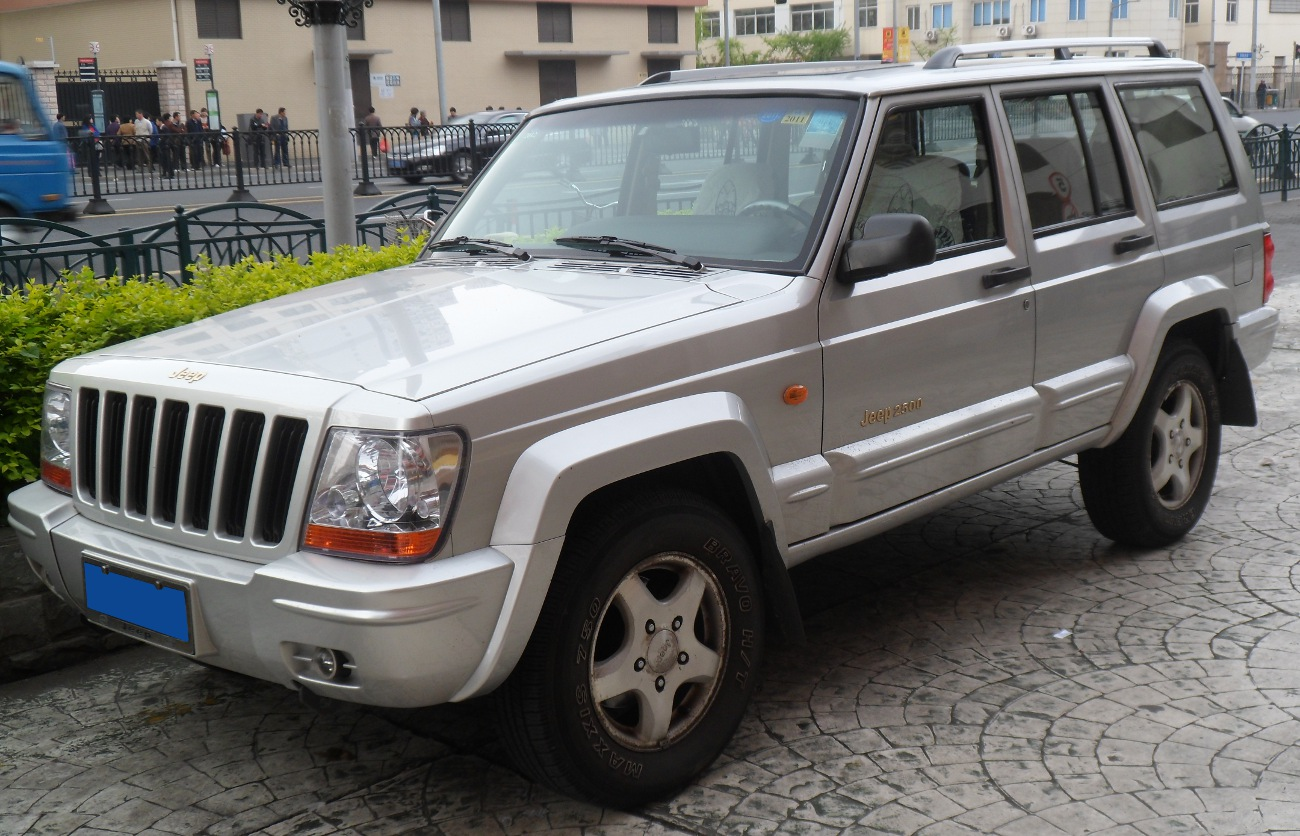
2002–2007
吉普2500/2700
Jeep 2500/2700

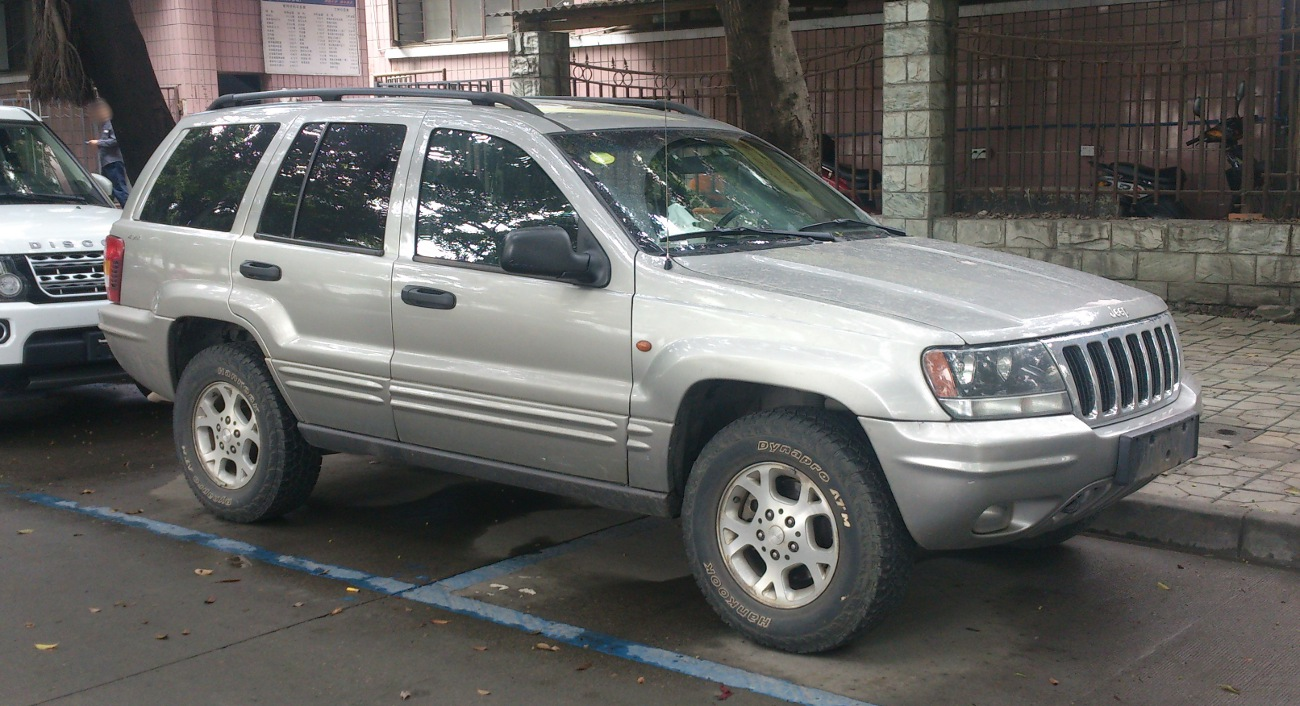
2004–2005
吉普4000/4700
Jeep 4000/4700

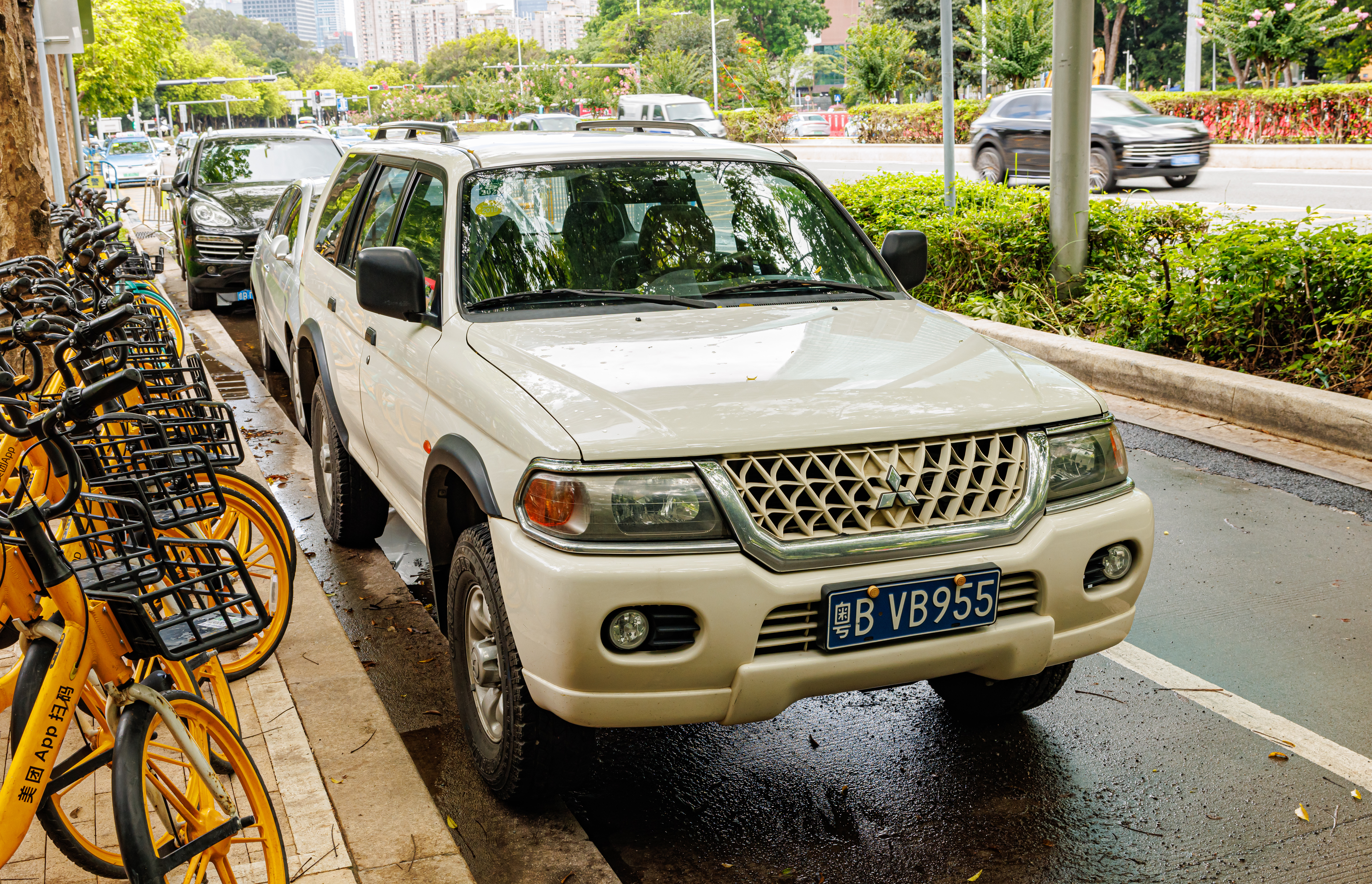
2003–2008
三菱帕杰罗速跑
Mitsubishi Pajero Sport

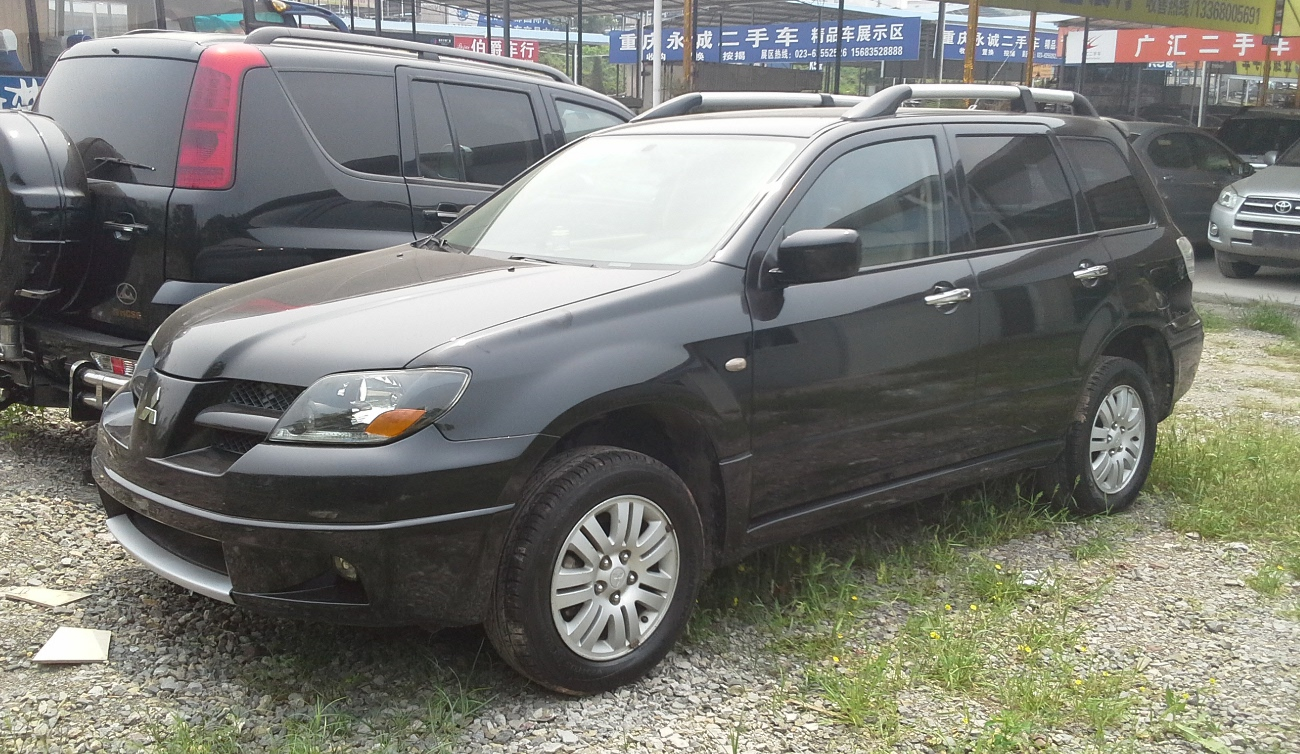
2003–2006
三菱欧蓝德经典
Mitsubishi Outlander

=== Former production (Beijing Benz) ===
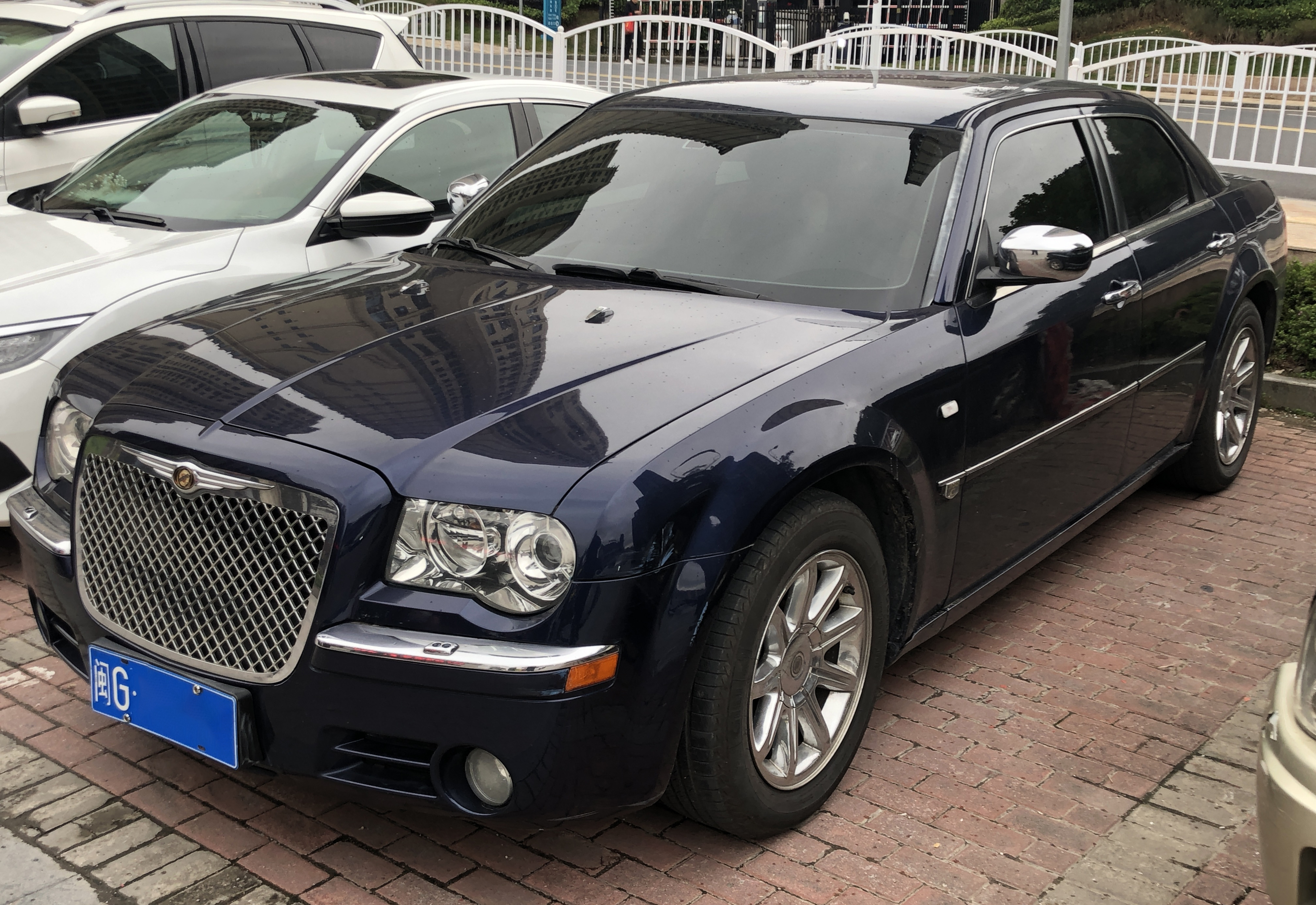
2006–2009
克莱斯勒300C
Chrysler 300C

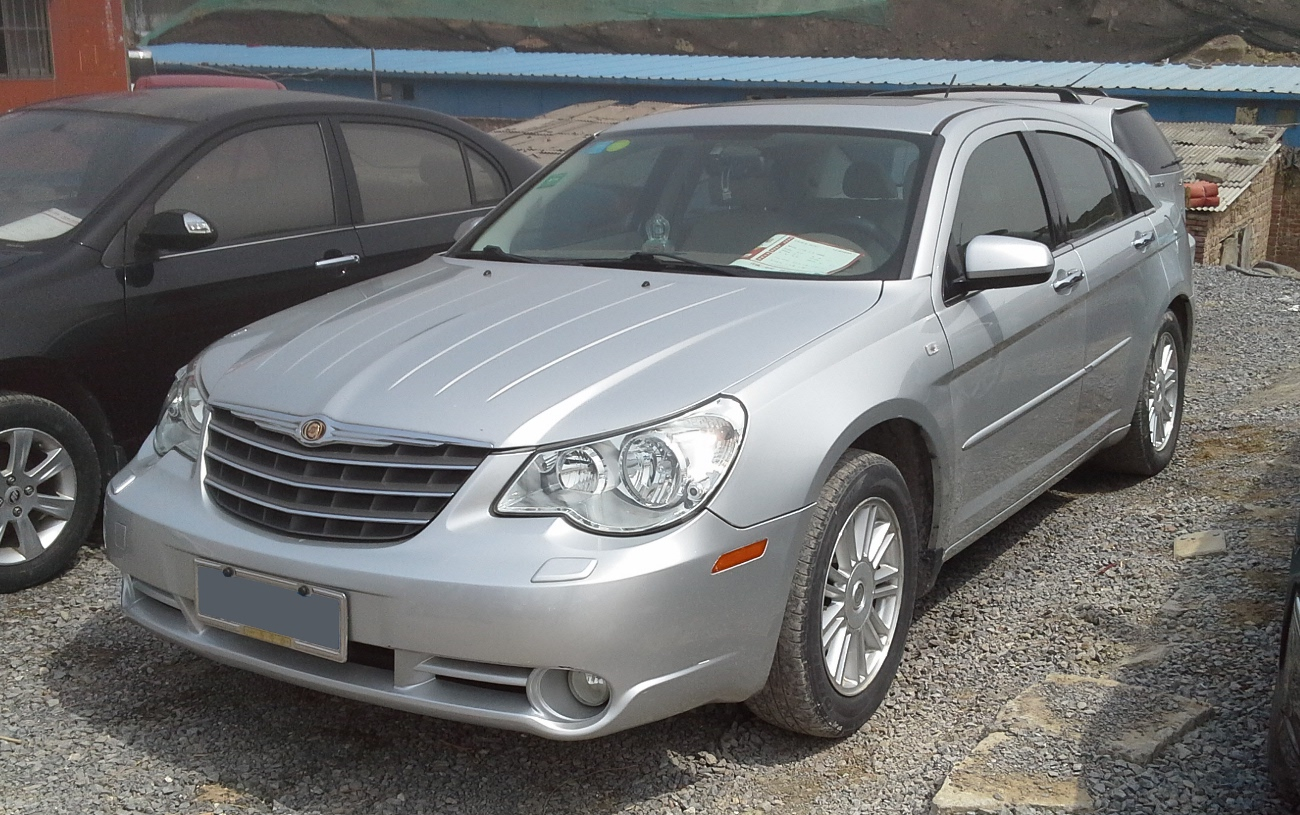
2008–2010
克莱斯勒铂锐
Chrysler Sebring

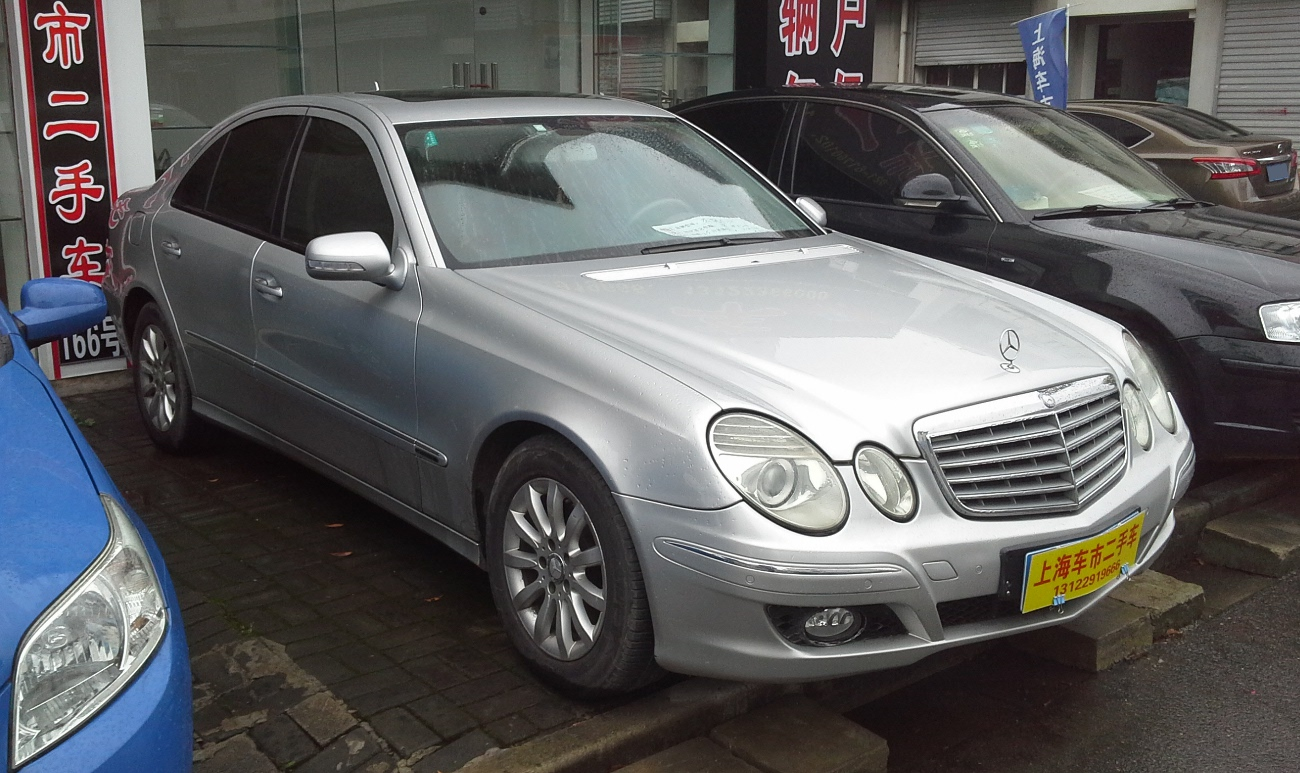
2005–2009
梅赛德斯-奔驰E级W211
Mercedes-Benz E-Class W211

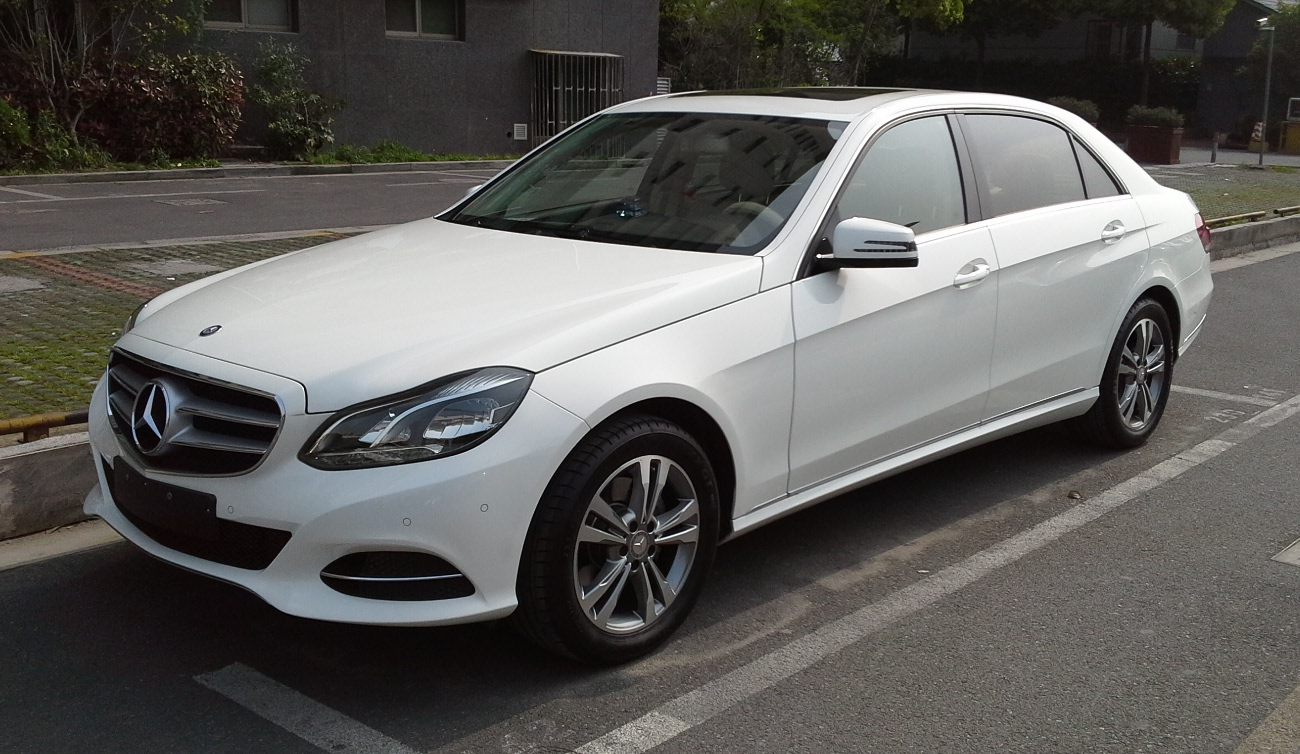
2010–2016
梅赛德斯-奔驰E级V212
Mercedes-Benz E-Class V212

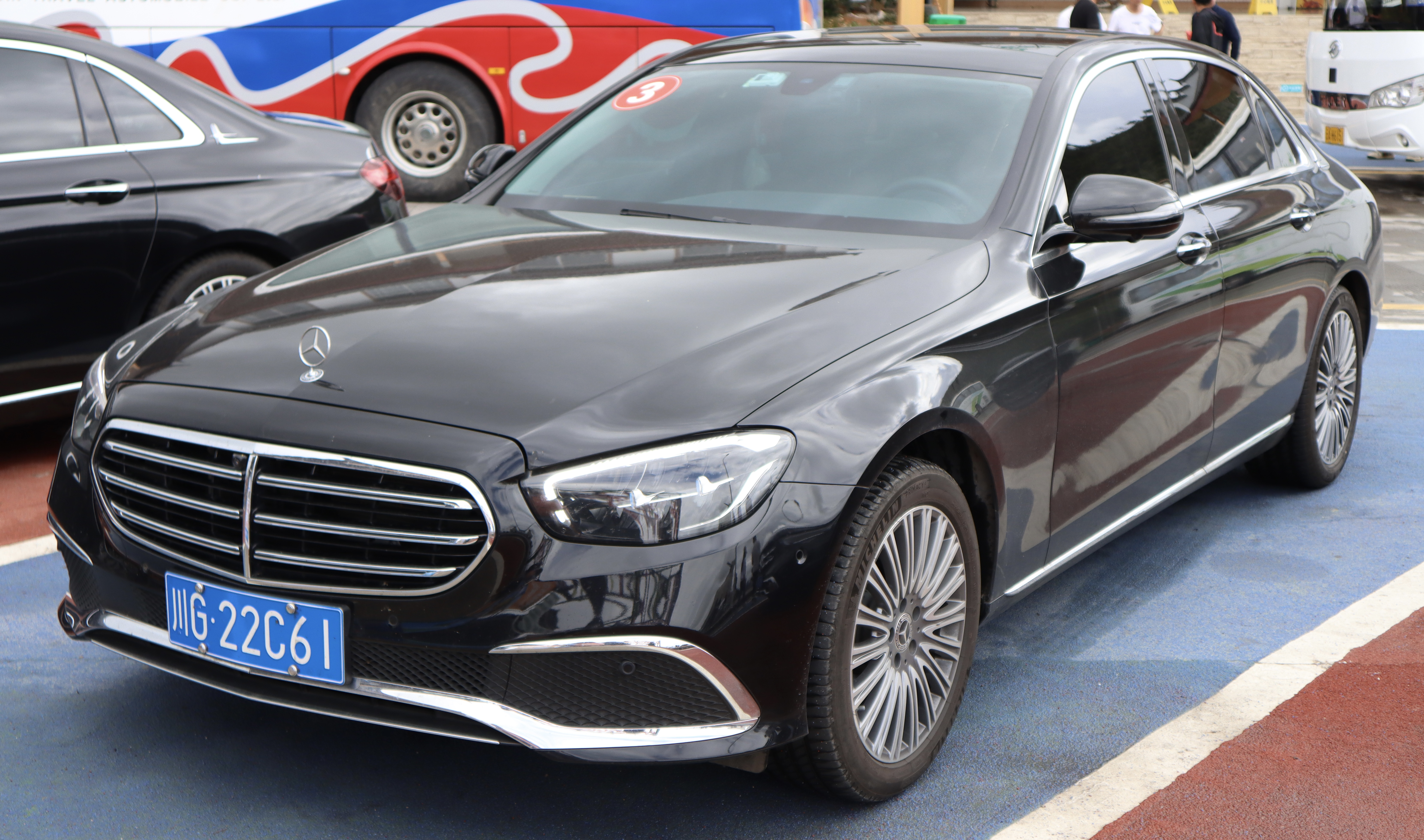
2016–2023
梅赛德斯-奔驰E级V213
Mercedes-Benz E-Class V213

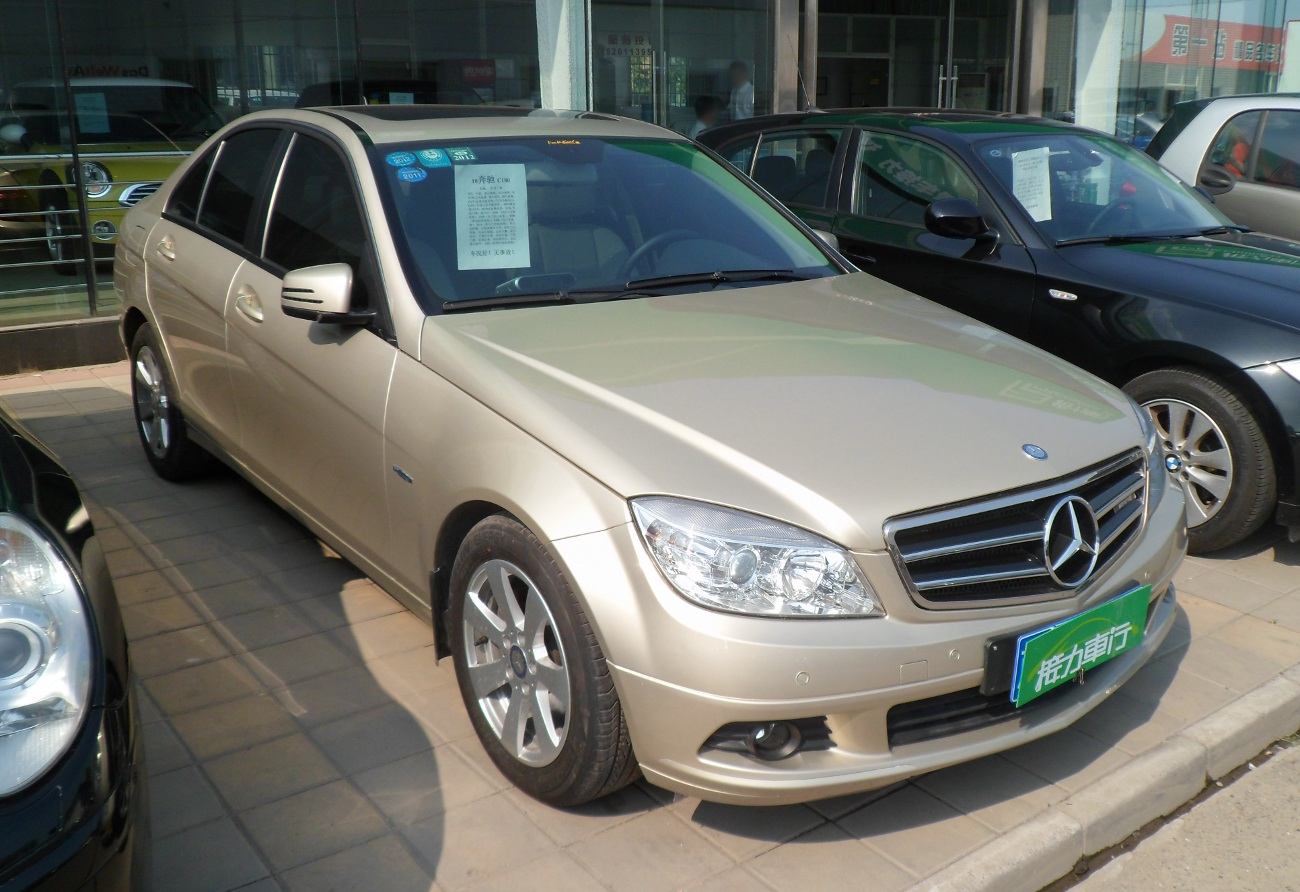
2008–2014
梅赛德斯-奔驰C级W204
Mercedes-Benz C-Class W204

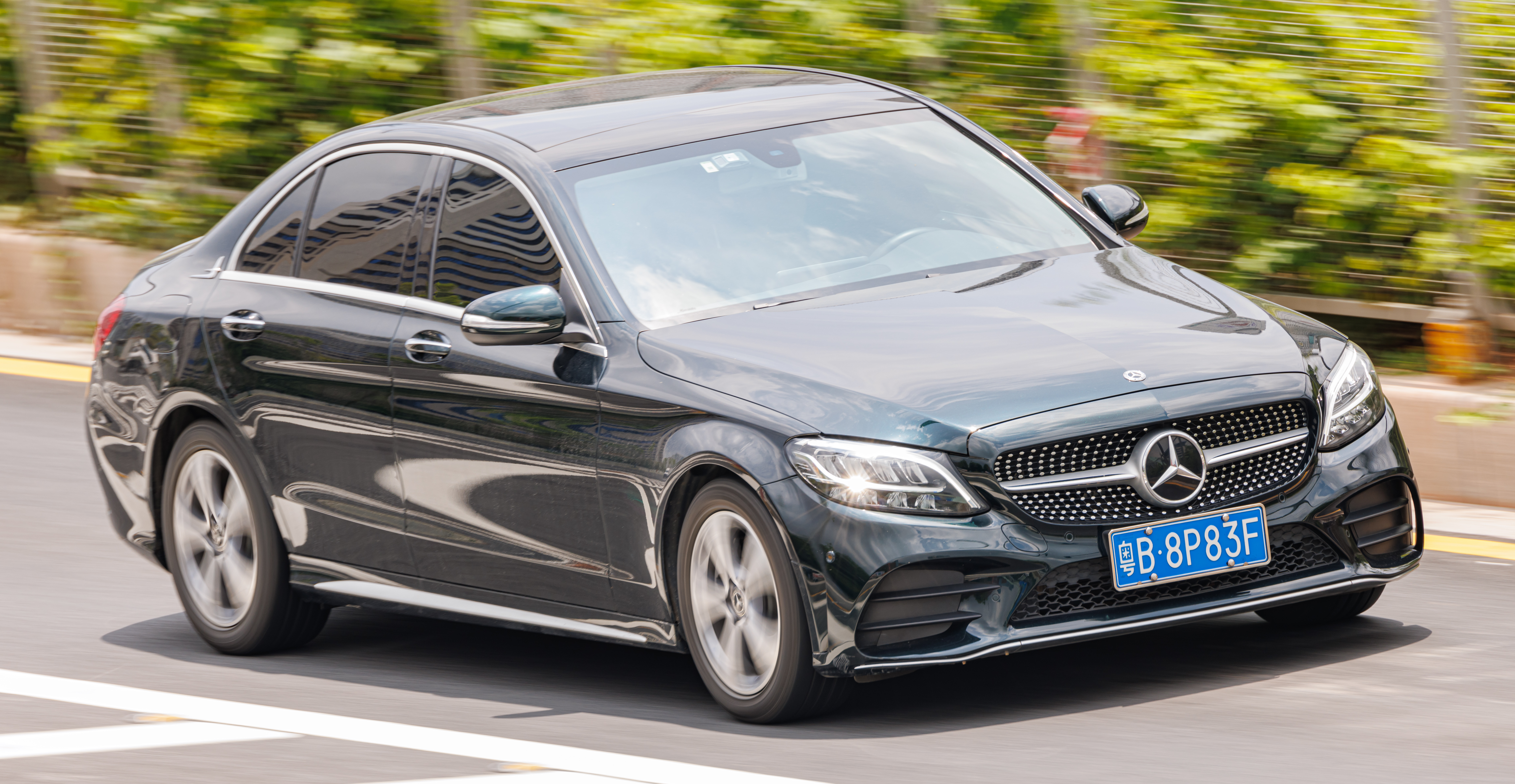
2014–2021
梅赛德斯-奔驰C级W205
Mercedes-Benz C-Class W205

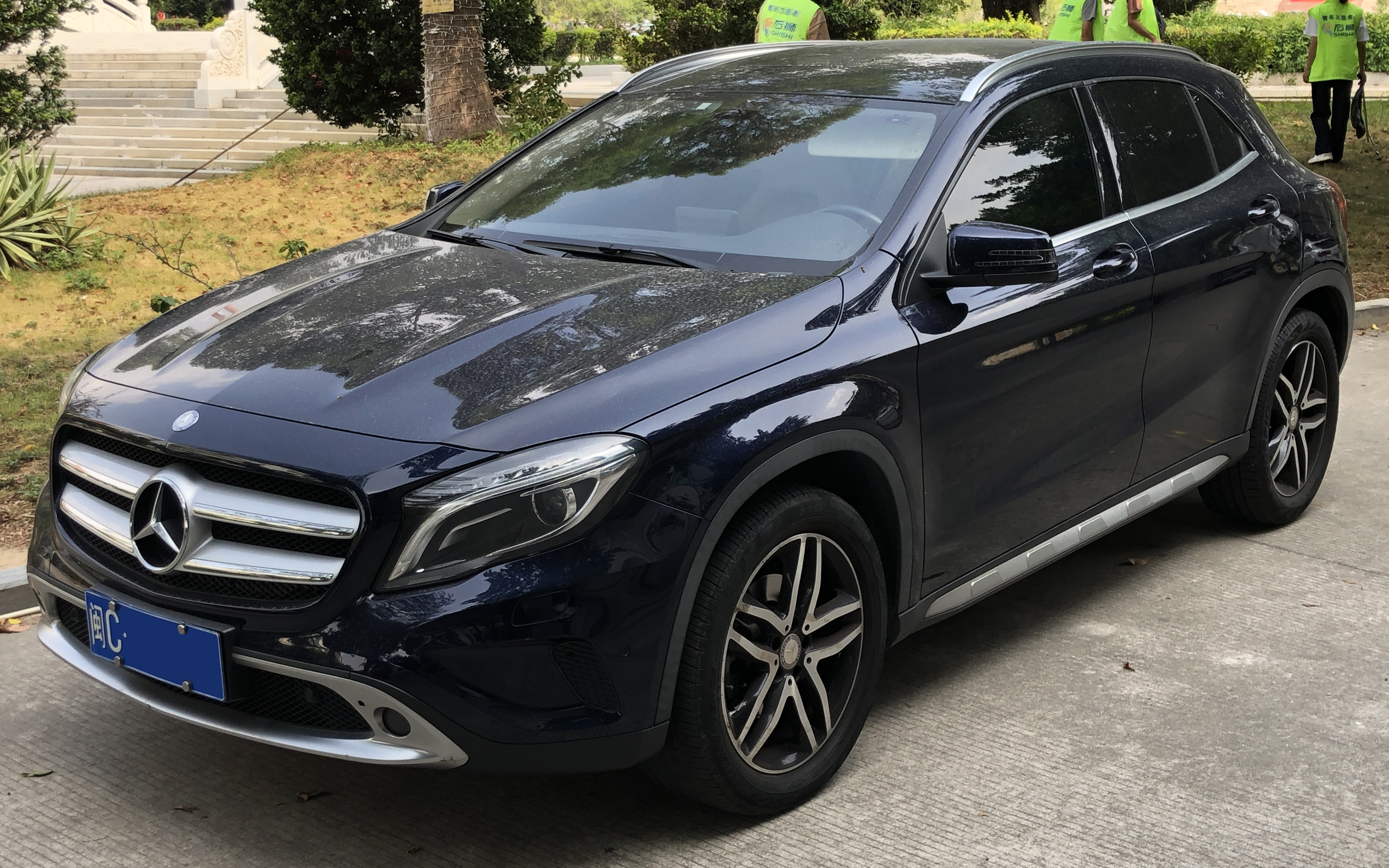
2015–2020
梅赛德斯-奔驰GLA级X156
Mercedes-Benz GLA-Class X156

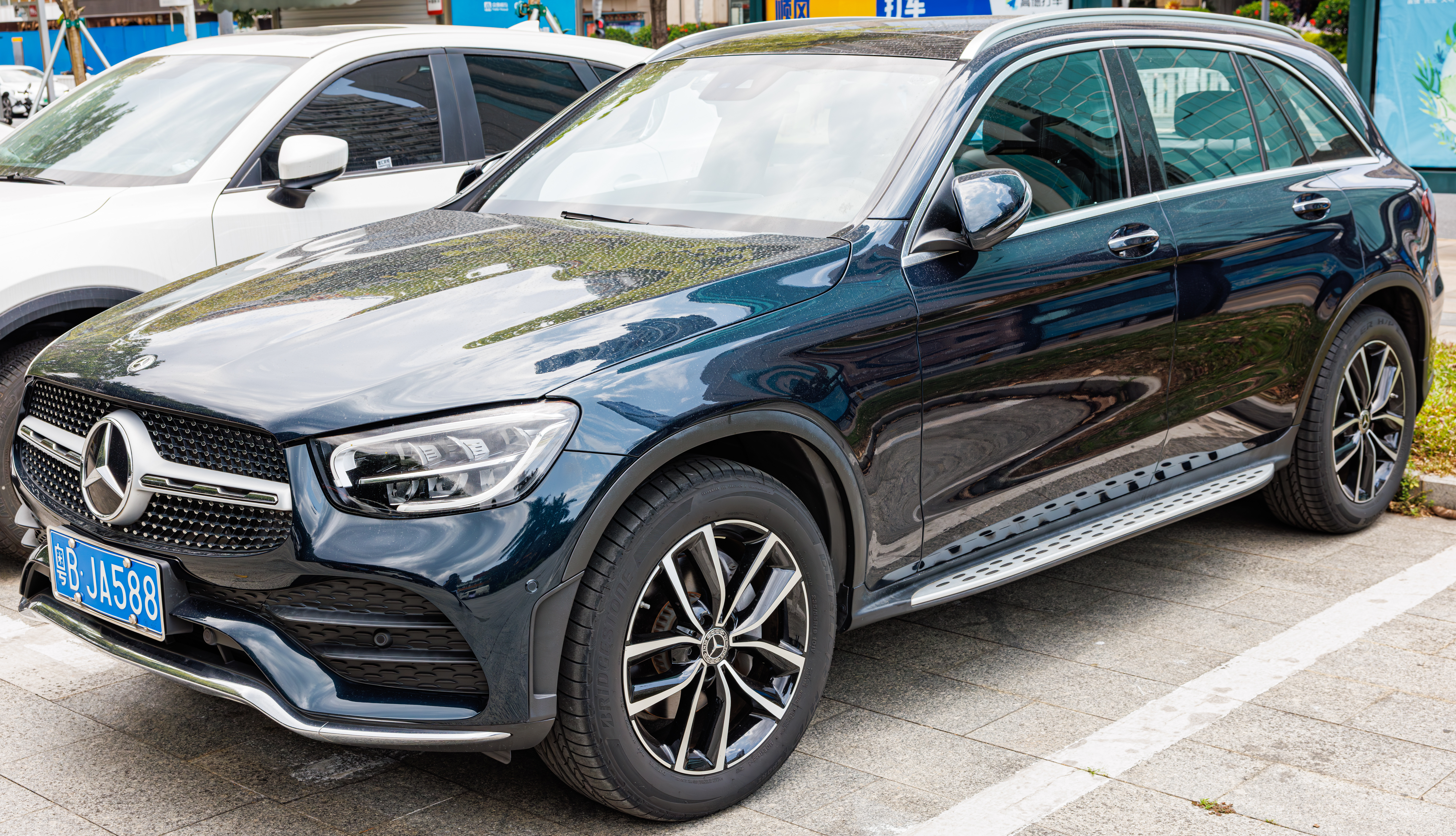
2015–2022
梅赛德斯-奔驰GLC
Mercedes-Benz GLC X253

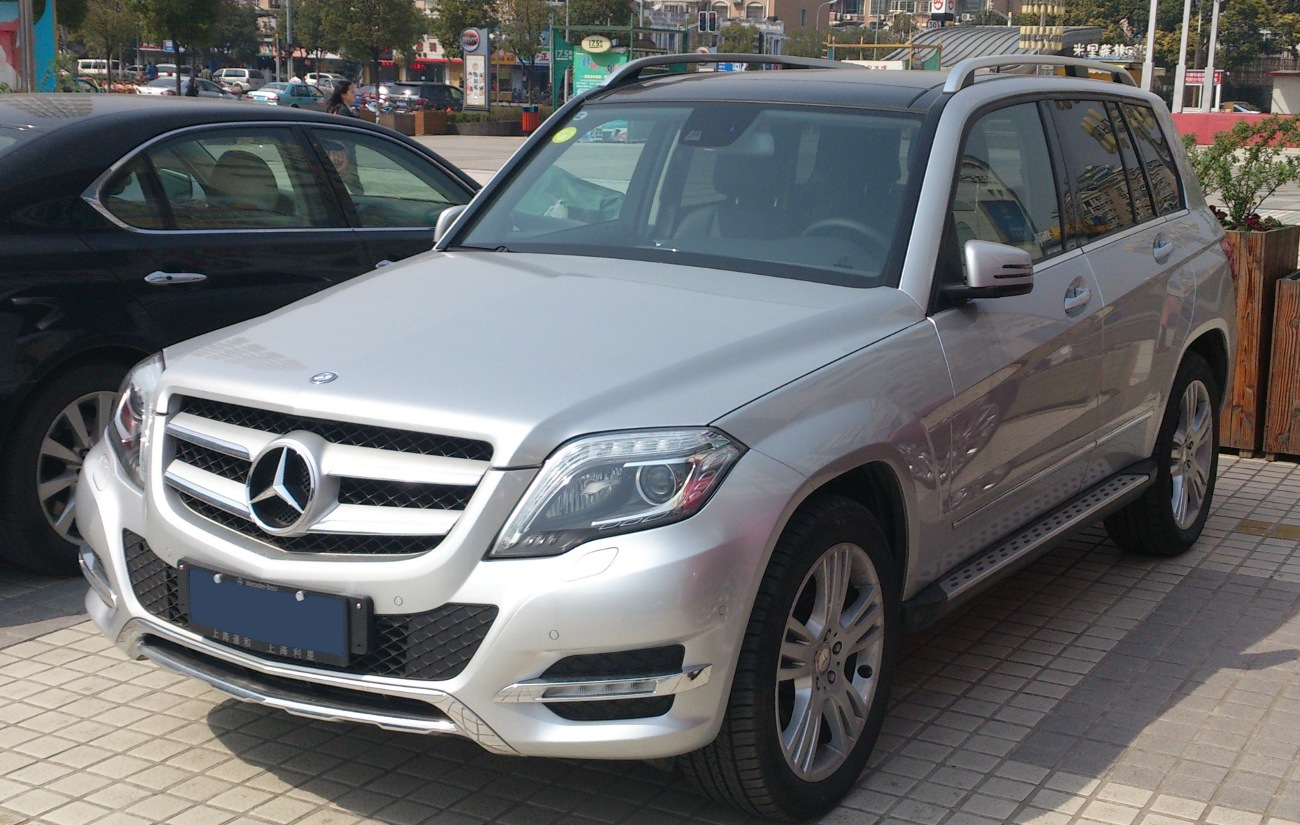
2008–2015
梅赛德斯-奔驰GLK级
Mercedes-Benz GLK-Class

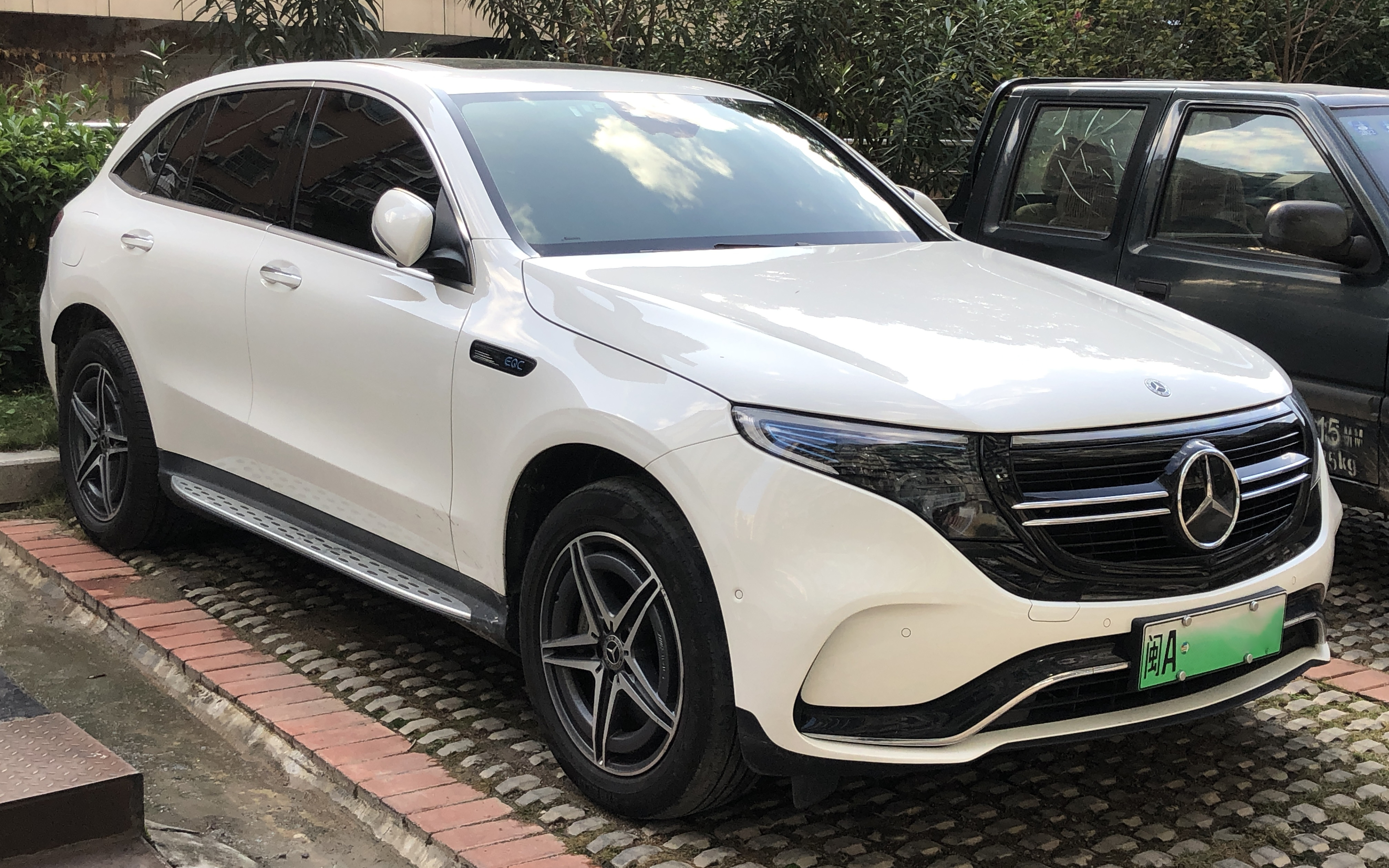
2019–2023
梅赛德斯-奔驰EQC
Mercedes-Benz EQC

=== Mercedes-Benz production under First Automobile Works ===
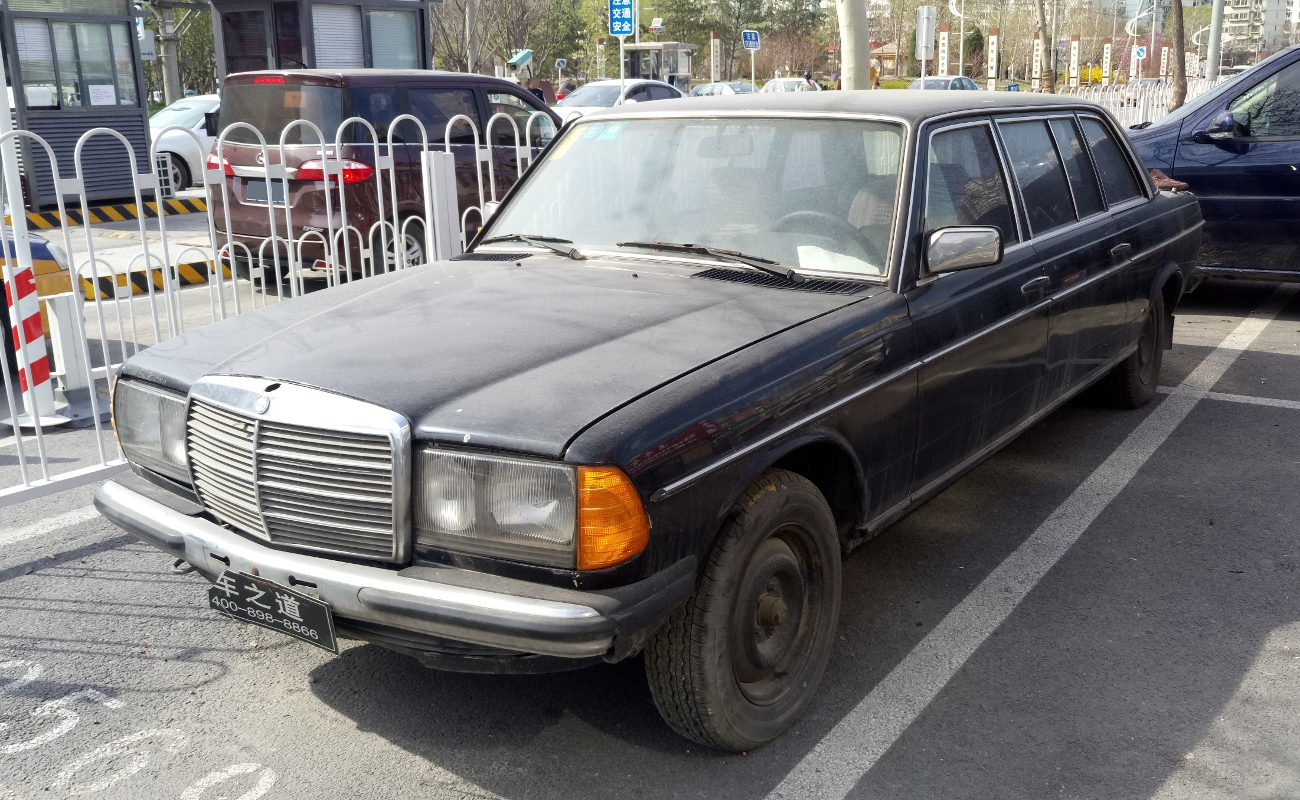
1988–1989
梅赛代斯-奔驰230E Lang V123
Mercedes-Benz 230E Lang V123

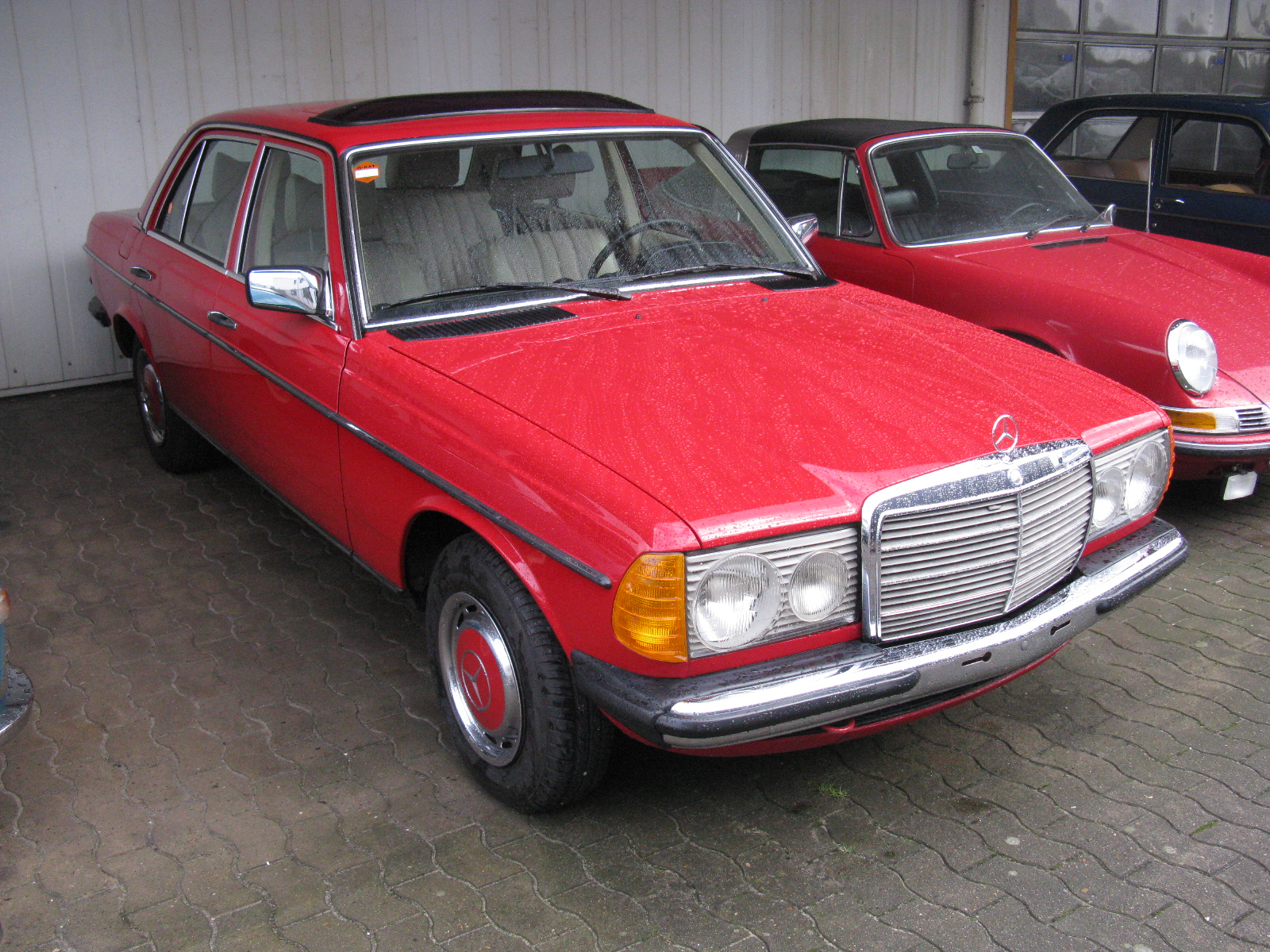
1988–1989
梅赛代斯-奔驰200 W123
Mercedes-Benz 200 W123

== See also ==
- Beijing Automobile Works (BAW)
- Beijing Automotive Industry Holding Co Ltd (BAIC)
- List of automobiles manufactured by Beijing Jeep Corporation
