= EK =

EK, Ek or ek may refer to:

== Businesses and organizations ==
- Eastern Kentucky Railway (with reporting mark EK), now-defunct railway
- Eastman Kodak (formerly with NYSE ticker symbol EK), US-based photography company, formerly
- Ek Commando Knife Co., US knife manufacturer
- Elinkeinoelämän keskusliitto, Confederation of Finnish Industries
- Emirates (airline) (IATA airline designator EK)
- European Kindred, prison/street gang in the United States

== People ==
People whose surname is Ek, or whose names include Ek, are listed at Ek.

== Places ==
- East Kilbride, town in South Lanarkshire, Scotland
- Ek Park, cricket ground in Kitwe, Zambia
- Enchanted Kingdom, theme park in the Philippines

== Science ==
- Exakelvin, unit of temperature, abbreviated as EK
- Kinetic energy, in physics, abbreviated as E_{k}

== Other uses ==
- Eisernes Kreuz, German acronym for the Iron Cross
- ek, the number 'one' in Hindi (Devanagari numerals)
- Ektara, ek tar, or ik tar, "one string," Indian musical instrument
- Mitsubishi eK, Japanese kei car

== See also ==
- Eric Kirkham Cole Limited (EKCO), a British electronics company
- ECC (disambiguation)
- Eck (disambiguation)
- Ekk (disambiguation)
- EC (disambiguation)
- EQ (disambiguation)
