= Eck =

Eck or ECK may refer to:

- Eck (brewery), a German brewery
- Eck en Wiel, a town in the Dutch province of Gelderland
- Eck Stadium, in Wichita, Kansas, United States
- Eckankar, a religion
  - Temple of Eck
- Loch Eck, in Scotland
- Team ECK, a World Wrestling Federation heel stable
- Electoral Commission of Kenya
- Energo-Chromo-Kinese, an esoteric-oriented movement
- European College of Kosovo

== People with the given name or nickname ==
- Eck Curtis (1902–1978), American football coach
- Dennis Eckersley (born 1954), American baseball player
- Alex McLeish (born 1959), Scottish footballer
- Eck Robertson (1886–1975), American fiddle player

== People with the surname ==
- Armin Eck (born 1964), German football coach and player
- Barbara Eck (born 1968), Austrian judoka
- Diana L. Eck (born 1946), American theologian
- Don Eck (born 1961), American football coach
- Dorothy Eck (1924–2017), American politician
- Franz Eck (1776–1810), German violinist
- Gary Eck, Australian comedian and actor
- Gerhard Eck (born 1960), German politician
- Heinz-Wilhelm Eck (1916–1945), German World War II U-boat commander
- Jason Eck (born 1977), American college football coach
- Jaxton Eck (born 2004), American football player
- Jay Eck (born 1950), American college basketball coach
- Jenny Eck (born 1979), American politician
- Johann Eck (1486–1543), 16th-century theologian
- Johnny Eck (1911–1991), American freak show performer
- Keith Eck (born 1955), American football player
- Stefan Eck (born 1956), German politician
- Ted Eck (born 1966), American soccer player
- Thomas Eck (1914–1988), American football player and coach
- Valentin Eck (c. 1494–before 1556), Swiss writer
- Werner Eck (born 1939), German historian

== See also ==
- Van Eck (disambiguation)
- Ekk (disambiguation)
- ECC (disambiguation)
- EC (disambiguation)
- EK (disambiguation)
- EQ (disambiguation)
