= EC =

EC or ec may refer to:

== Arts and entertainment ==
- EC Comics, an American publisher of comic books
- Electric Circus, a Canadian television program
- Eric Clapton Stratocaster, signature model guitars by Fender

== Businesses and organisations ==
=== Government ===
- Environment and Climate Change Canada, a Canadian federal government department
- European Commission, the executive body of the European Union
- European Council, the European Union institution comprising the college of heads of state of government
- European Communities, one of the three pillars of the EU
- European Community, a significant component of the European Union from 1993 to 2009, renamed European Economic Community

=== Transportation ===
- EuroCity, a train service of the European inter-city rail network
- EasyJet Europe (IATA code: EC)
- Avialeasing (former IATA code: EC), a cargo airline
- East Coast (train operating company), a train operating company in the UK
- EC, the aircraft registration prefix for Spain

=== Education ===
- Eckerd College, US
- Edinburgh College, Scotland
- Erskine College, US

=== Other businesses and organizations ===
- EC Comics, a defunct comic book company
- Equine Canada, Canada's national horse sport federation
- Engineers Canada, a national organization that regulates the practice of engineering in Canada
- Engineering Council, formerly Engineering Council UK, a regulatory authority in the UK for registration of engineers and technicians

== Places ==
- EC postcode area, for east central London
- Ecuador (ISO 3166-1 country code)
- East Chicago, Indiana, a city in the US

== Science and technology ==
=== Biology and medicine ===
- Emergency contraception
- Endothelial cell
- Enterochromaffin cell
- Entorhinal cortex, memory center in the brain
- Enzyme Commission number (EC number), used for the numerical classification of enzymes
- Extracellular

=== Chemistry ===
- Ethylene carbonate, an ester and a popular solvent in lithium-ion batteries
- European Community number (EC-No, or EC#), determined by the European Commission for identifying chemicals

=== Computing ===
- .ec, the country code top level domain (ccTLD) for Ecuador
- Amazon Elastic Compute Cloud
- Electronic cash, an electronic payment system
- Evolutionary computation, computing that utilises evolution to automatically find solutions to formally defined problems
- Embedded controller, a microcontroller in computers that handles various system tasks that the operating system does not handle
- ExpressCard, an interface connecting peripheral devices to a computer, usually a laptop
- Erasure code, in information theory

=== Physics ===
- Electrical conductivity, of a solution
  - EC meter (electrical conductivity meter), measures the electrical conductivity in a solution
- Edinburgh-Cape Blue Object Survey, an astronomical catalogue
- Electron capture, in nuclear physics
- Exacoulomb (EC), an SI unit for electric charge equal to 10^{18} coulomb

=== Other sciences ===
- Early Cycladic, an archaeological period
- Elliptic curve, in mathematics
- Emergent cyclical theory (E-C theory), in psychology
- Electronic cigarette, or e-cigarette

== Other uses ==
- Elimination communication, a method of toilet training
- Extended coverage, in insurance
- Extra credit, in academia
- Executive Condominium, a type of housing in Singapore
- Ethiopian calendar (EC or E.C.)

== See also ==
- Eastern Caribbean dollar (EC$)
- EC50, half maximal effective concentration of a drug, antibody or toxicant
- Embedded C++ (EC++), a programming language
- Elliptic-curve cryptography (ECC)
- ECC (disambiguation)
- Eck (disambiguation)
- Ekk (disambiguation)
- EK (disambiguation)
- EQ (disambiguation)
