= ECC =

ECC may refer to:

== Education ==
- ECC (eikaiwa), a Japanese English teaching company
- Eastern Christian College, in Bel Air, Maryland, United States; defunct
- El Camino College, in Alondra Park, California, United States
- Elgin Community College, in Illinois, United States
- Erie Community College, in Williamsville, New York, United States
- Essex County College, in New Jersey, United States
- Eveland Christian College, in San Mateo, Isabela
- Ewing Christian College, in Allahabad, Uttar Pradesh, India

== Government and politics ==
- Economic Coordination Committee (Pakistan), of the Government of Pakistan
- Employees' Compensation Commission, a Philippine government agency
- End Conscription Campaign, a former South African anti-apartheid organization
- European civil code
- European Commodity Clearing, the energy clearing house for the European Energy Exchange
- Electronic Communications Committee of the European Conference of Postal and Telecommunications Administrations
- Electronic Communications Convention, a treaty aiming at facilitating the use of electronic communications in international trade
- European Cryptologic Center of the United States National Security Agency
- Exeter City Council, the local government district of Exeter, England.

== Music ==
- Eastern Conference Champions, an American indie rock band
- Eugene Concert Choir, an American choir
- The Evolution Control Committee, an American experimental music band

== Religion ==
- Ecclesiastes, a book of the Hebrew Bible
- Ecumenical Catholic Church, US
- Ecumenical Catholic Communion, US
- Ecumenical Christian Centre, in Bengaluru, India
- Evangelical Covenant Church, North America

== Sports ==
- East Central Conference (IHSAA), an athletic conference from 1947 to 1969 in Eastern Indiana
- East Coast Conference (Division I), a former US NCAA Division I athletics conference
- East Coast Conference, a US NCAA Division II athletics conference
- ECC Antwerp, an indoor tennis tournament
- Empire Junior College Conference, a defunct US junior college athletic conference, also known as the Empire College Conference
- European Challenge Cup, a rugby union competition
- European Champions Cup (disambiguation)
- European Cricket Council, an international body in cricket

== Science and technology ==
- 3,4-Epoxycyclohexylmethyl-3’,4’-epoxycyclohexane carboxylate, a resin with industrial applications
- Early childhood caries, a tooth disease in children
- Elliptic-curve cryptography, a public-key cryptography algorithm
- Endocervical curettage, a medical procedure
- Engineered cementitious composite, a.k.a. bendable concrete
- Error correction code
  - ECC memory, a type of computer memory
- Exchange coupled composite media
- SAP ECC, enterprise resource planning software

== Transport ==
- Crossair Europe, a defunct French airline
- Eccles railway station, Manchester, England (National Rail station code)
- Electric Car Corporation, a British seller of electric cars
- Volvo ECC, a concept car
- A class designation for Reading electric multiple units

== Other uses ==
- Electronic Check Council, an American industry association
- English China Clays, an English mining company
- Emergency control centre, or emergency communications centre

== See also ==
- EC (disambiguation)
- Eck (disambiguation)
- Ekk (disambiguation)
- EK (disambiguation)
- EQ (disambiguation)
