= Ekk =

Ekk or EKK may refer to:

== People ==
- Nikolai Ekk (1902–1976), Soviet filmmaker
- Oksana Ekk (born 1974), Russian sprinter
- Ekkasak Buabao (born 1985), Thai footballer
- Ekkaluck Thonghkit (born 1983), Thai footballer

== Other uses ==
- North Estonian language (ISO 636:ekk)

== See also ==
- EK (disambiguation)
- Eck (disambiguation)
- ECC (disambiguation)
- EC (disambiguation)
- EQ (disambiguation)
