= BioSteel =

BioSteel may refer to:

- BioSteel Sports Nutrition, a Canadian company
- BioSteel (fiber), a material derived from goat's milk

== See also ==
- Biosteel, a silk-based material produced by AMSilk
