= Mercedes-Benz Vision EQXX =

2022 battery electric vehicle concept

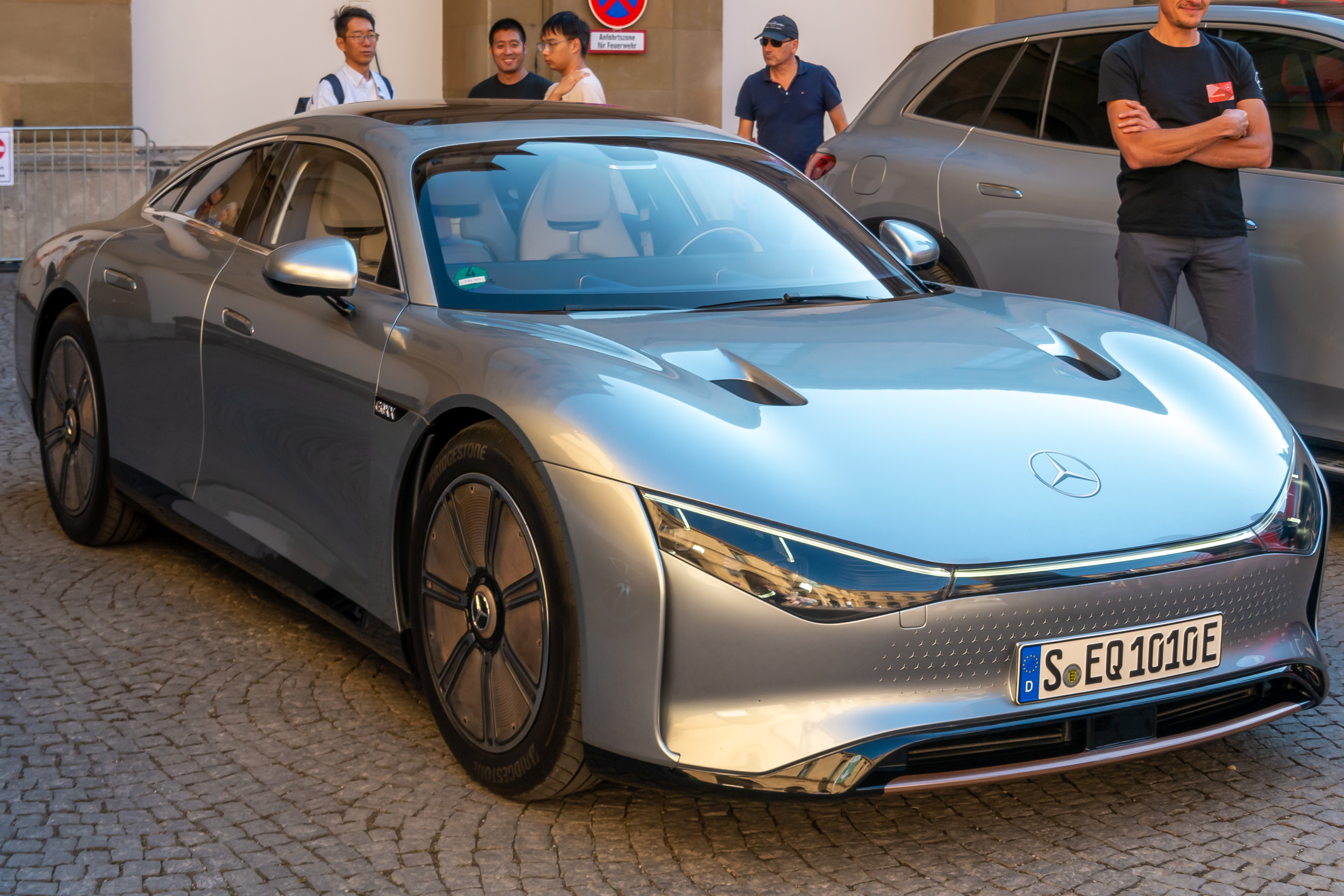

Overview
- Manufacturer: Mercedes-Benz Group
- Model years: 2022
- Assembly: Germany: Sindelfingen
- Designer: James Qiu, Gorden Wagener

Body and chassis
- Class: Executive car (E)
- Body style: 4-door kammback saloon
- Layout: Rear-motor, rear-wheel-drive
- Platform: Mercedes-Benz Modular Architecture (MMA)

Powertrain
- Electric motor: Permanent magnet synchronous
- Transmission: Single-speed reduction gear
- Battery: 100 kWh (360 MJ) 900V lithium-ion
- Electric range: >1,000 km (621 mi)
- Plug-in charging: 150 kW DC

Dimensions
- Wheelbase: 2,800 mm (110.2 in)
- Length: 4,977 mm (195.9 in)
- Width: 1,870 mm (73.6 in)
- Height: 1,350 mm (53.1 in)
- Kerb weight: 1,755 kg (3,869 lb) (dry)

The Mercedes-Benz Vision EQXX is a battery electric concept car by German carmaker Mercedes-Benz. Unveiled at the 2022 edition of the Consumer Electronics Show as part of the Mercedes-EQ series, it is a proof of concept, with Mercedes-Benz's primary goal being a target of below 10 kWh per 100 km (alternatively, greater than 10 km per kWh) in real-life conditions. The EQXX's exterior features various stylistic cues that help maximise its aerodynamic efficiency, and numerous eco-friendly materials that adorn the interior.

The car's name refers to Mercedes' vision for the future of automobile manufacturing, with Mercedes chairman Ola Källenius stating that the EQXX is "how we imagine the future of electric cars", and that the car "underlines where our entire company is headed". The first production model to incorporate aspects of the EQXX was the electrified model of the 2026 Mercedes-Benz CLA, with Källenius stating that the CLA was "the EQXX on the road".

== Background ==
Mercedes' entrance into the battery electric market began in 2016, with the introduction of the EQ concept car at the 2016 Paris Motor Show, where several other electric cars such as the Volkswagen ID. and Renault Zoe also made their debut. The EQ concept went into production at the end of 2019, and like its later EQA and EQB siblings, it was constructed on a platform designed for internal combustion engines rather than a battery electric vehicle.

In October 2020, Mercedes introduced two dedicated electric vehicle platforms as part of a weekly strategy meeting–the Electric Vehicle Architecture (EVA) and the Mercedes-Benz Modular Architecture (MMA). The former platform is aimed towards larger vehicles such as full-size saloons and SUVs, with the latter aimed towards smaller vehicles such as compact cars. Alongside the announcement of the platforms was also the revelation that Mercedes would build an electric vehicle with an extensive all-electric range, targeting a range of over 1,200 km (746 mi) with a 100 kWh (360 MJ) battery pack. This target was later revised to 1,000 km (621 mi). The structure of EQXX is said to incorporate several aspects of the upcoming MMA architecture, although it sits on its own bespoke rear-wheel drive platform.

The first teaser of the EQXX was revealed at the end of November 2021. Mercedes-Benz Chief Operating Officer Markus Schäfer also announced alongside the teaser the reveal date of the EQXX, which was to be 5 January 2022 at the Consumer Electronics Show. However, the car digitally debuted two days earlier on 3 January.

== Overview ==
Initial design on the EQXX began in June 2020, after a request from the company board for an electric vehicle with 1,000 km (621 mi) of range. In order to fulfill the request, Mercedes selected a team of specialised engineers from various departments. This team would also collaborate with Mercedes' Formula One engine manufacturing subsidiary, Mercedes AMG High Performance Powertrains. The latter had a significant role in the design of the EQXX's powertrain and packaging of the battery pack, incorporating their Formula One expertise. The primary design goals for the EQXX were weight reduction and aerodynamic efficiency, both of which would work in conjunction to give the EQXX 1,000 km (621 mi) of range. This meant that with a 100 kWh (360 MJ) battery, the car had to travel more than 10 km (6 mi) per kWh. Various smart features are also included in the interior of the EQXX to further reduce accessory power consumption.

=== Battery and powertrain ===
The EQXX's lithium-ion battery pack and drivetrain were largely developed in partnership with Mercedes AMG High Performance Powertrains. Several changes were made to optimise the efficiency of the powertrain, starting off with redesigning the inverter, now incorporating Onsemi's silicon carbide anodes, along with the engine control unit being almost identical to the one utilised in the Mercedes-AMG ONE. In order to increase energy density, Mercedes also introduced a new method of packing the individual cells in the battery pack called cell-to-pack. Cell-to-pack creates tighter packaging because the cells themselves are not separated into modules, but instead are directly placed into the battery pack itself without any sort of physical partition. A sugar cane-carbon fibre composite forms the lid of the 'OneBox', a structure which compartmentalises the electrical components and is said to weigh 495 kg (1,091 lb). The cell-to-pack method of packaging is often found in Formula One, including Mercedes' own cars. Mercedes worked together with their suppliers to reduce the battery pack's weight by 30%, reduce the size by half compared to a contemporary Mercedes-Benz EQS, and increase cell energy density by 20%. Lightweight brake discs fashioned from aluminium possess regenerative braking capabilities to further extend the EQXX's range.

A single-speed direct-drive transmission transfers power from the battery pack to the radial flux motor located at the rear axle, which produces 150 kW (204 PS; 201 hp). A cooling plate situated below the car provides a passive method of heat transfer, with shutters that can be adjusted to control airflow. A radiator is still present should there be a need for extreme heat or intense climate control. The EQXX also uses a 900-volt architecture, which allows for a lower electric current. A lower current reduces Joule heating caused by copper loss, despite the EQXX's relatively thinner cabling. As a result of the powertrain optimisations, the EQXX is said to have parasitic loss of only 5%, i.e. 95% of the energy from the battery is transferred to the wheels, with 5% lost during the energy transfer to things such as the gearbox.

The EQXX features DC fast charging, with Mercedes claiming the ability to add 300 km (186 mi) of range within 15 minutes. Despite this capability, the charging port was sealed during the EQXX's long-range demonstration runs to prevent tampering.

=== Interior ===
The EQXX features neuromorphic computer systems designed in partnership with Australian firm BrainChip which help to drastically reduce the power consumption of interior components such as the infotainment system. The EQXX's neuromorphic computer systems run spiking neural networks, which simulate the structure of natural neural networks and assist features such as the voice user interface. A 1,206 mm (47.5 in) 8K resolution screen spanning the entire front dashboard contains the controls for the infotainment, along with other information about car vitals. The interior features various eco-friendly materials; the carpet is woven from bamboo fibres, and the seats are adorned with faux leather made from mycelium. Instead of door handles, the EQXX features straps to open the doors that are fashioned from a vegan silk material produced in collaboration with German textile firm AMSilk. A cactus fibre-based material also upholsters the seats.

=== Exterior ===
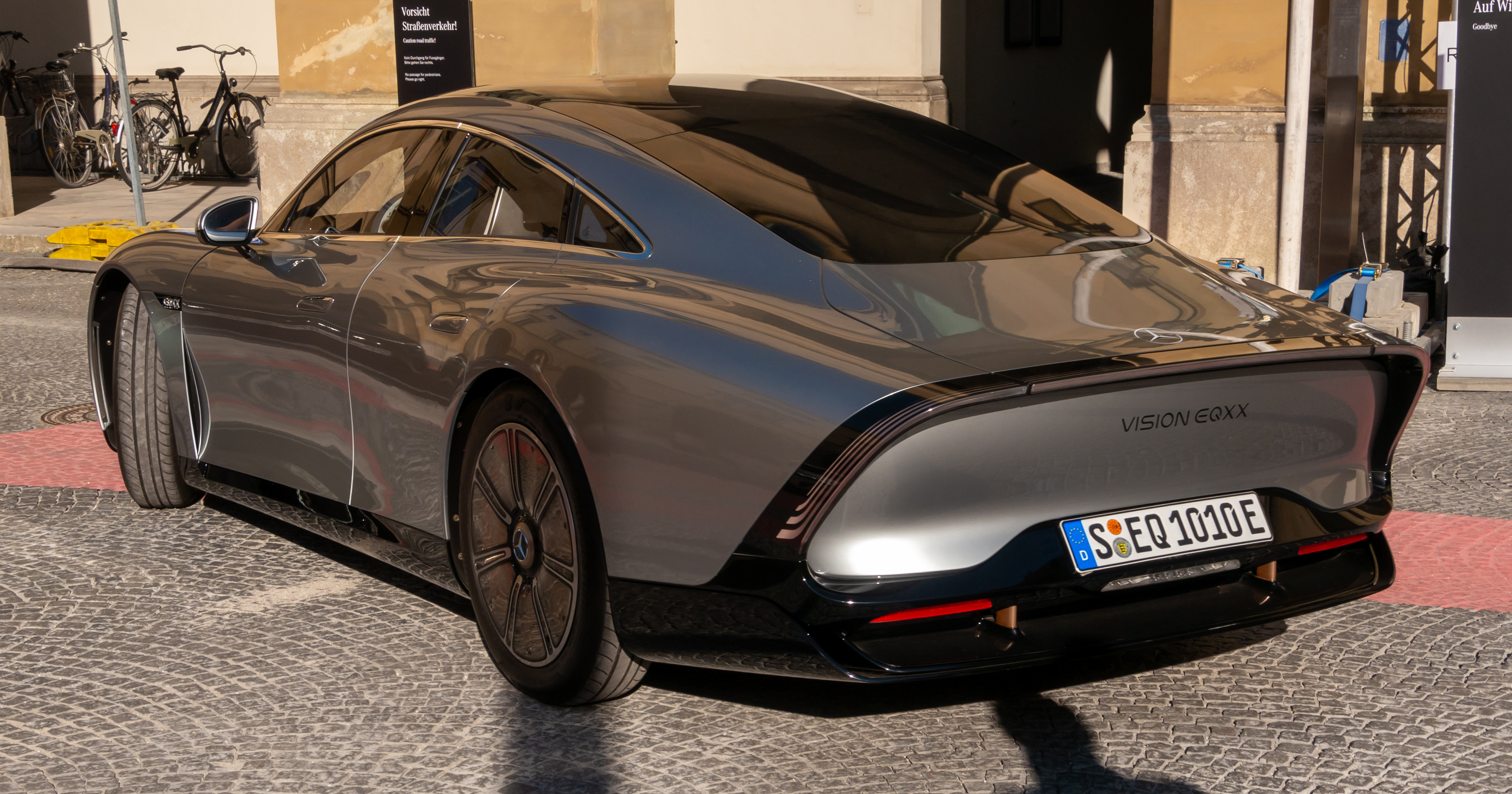
The EQXX, as seen from the rear, showing the distinctive Kammback styling.

Another area where Mercedes extracted significantly more range was the refinement of the EQXX's aerodynamic profile. The rear features Kammback styling and has an axle track 50 mm (2.0 in) narrower than the front, in order to create the ideal "teardrop" shape. The teardrop shape, first popularised in 1937 by Talbot-Lago, is considered to be the ideal shape for an automobile to have the least amount of aerodynamic drag. The Kamm styling aims to reduce the air vortex formed behind the rear of the car. The teardrop profile of the EQXX contributes greatly to lowering its drag coefficient, the lowest of any battery electric vehicle at 0.17. The EQXX also has semi-transparent wheel covers, which have miniature vents that help reduce turbulence surrounding the wheel wells. A lightweight forged magnesium rim construction helps to reduce the rolling resistance of the bespoke Bridgestone 185/65 R20 tyres, which themselves have been designed specifically with the goal of reducing rolling resistance.

The EQXX also has wing mirrors, instead of using cameras like the ones found in the Honda e, although the mirrors are said to be much more aerodynamic than regular wing mirrors. The decision to retain wing mirrors was made on the basis that an electronic camera system would draw too much power and negatively affect the range of the car. 117 solar panels developed in partnership with the Fraunhofer Institute for Solar Energy Systems adorn the roof of the EQXX, which power the ancillary systems such as the infotainment system, and are connected to a lithium iron phosphate battery separate from the main lithium-ion battery.

Illumination of the front and rear is provided by LEDs and a full light bar, and instead of the traditional Mercedes-Benz star bonnet ornament, the star is incorporated into the front bumper as a sticker. As with the rear wheels, the front wheels sit completely flush with the bodywork. This gives the EQXX a frontal area of 2.12 m^{2} (22.8 sq ft), 0.39 m^{2} (4.2 sq ft) less than Mercedes' most aerodynamically efficient production car, the EQS450+. In order to further reduce weight, the EQXX's body in white was constructed from a blend of high-tensile steel and steel recycled from scrap. Fibreglass and carbon fibre doors reinforced with aluminium help keep passengers safe in the event of a side collision.

== Demonstration runs ==
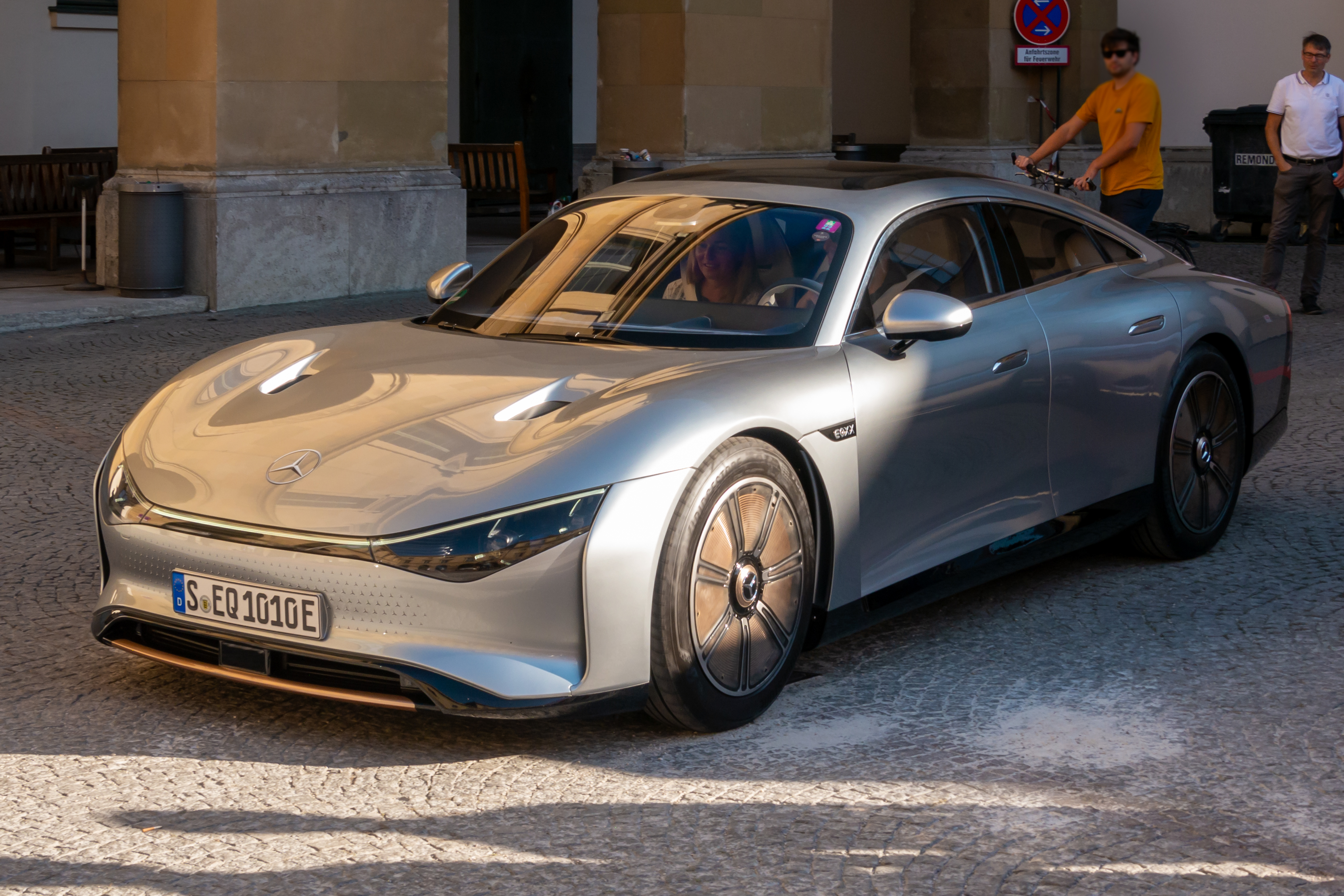
Vision EQXX on demonstration runs during IAA Mobility 2023 in Munich

The EQXX has completed several demonstration runs in which it surpassed the initial kilometrage target of 1,000 km (621 mi). The first was a trip from Sindelfingen, Germany to Cassis, France on a full charge, where it covered 1,008 km (626 mi) whilst maintaining an average energy consumption of 8.7 kWh (31 MJ) per 100 km (62 mi), or just over 10 km (6 mi) per kWh. The second was a trip from Stuttgart, Germany to Silverstone, Northamptonshire, in which it surpassed the first trip's record, travelling 1,202 km (747 mi) on a full charge. Average energy consumption was also lower, at 8.3 kWh (30 MJ) per 100 km (62 mi), or 12.1 km (7.5 mi) per kWh. The EQXX also participated in the 2022 Goodwood Festival of Speed.

Although the EQXX has travelled beyond 1,000 km (621 mi) in real-life conditions, Eva Grenier, chief engineer of the EQXX's drive system, claimed that the EQXX should score even higher on the Worldwide Harmonised Light Vehicles Test Procedure (WLTP).

In March 2024, the EQXX made another demonstration run, travelling from Riyadh to Dubai. This journey covered approximately 1,010 km (628 mi), with the focus being solely on efficiency during this run. The EQXX managed to maintain an average energy consumption of 13.5 km (8.4 mi) per kWh, in temperatures reaching 34 °C (93 °F).

== In production vehicles ==
Although the EQXX itself remains as a one-off concept, several of the EQXX's features such as powertrain components and other smart features will feature in production models. The first was the electrified version of the 2026 model year of the Mercedes-Benz CLA, which also sits upon Mercedes' new MMA architecture.
