= Ecks =

Ecks may refer to:

- X, a letter of the Latin alphabet
- Sumach Ecks (born 1978), American musician and yogi
- Ecks, a boss character in the 2024 Nintendo Switch game Mario & Luigi: Brothership
- Jeremiah Ecks, a character in the film Ballistic: Ecks vs. Sever

== See also ==
- Eck (disambiguation)
- X (disambiguation)
