= EQS =

EQS may refer to:

- Etixx-Quick-Step, a professional cycling team
- Mercedes-Benz EQS, an electric sedan
- Mercedes-Benz EQS SUV, an electric sport utility vehicle
- Environmental Quality Standard, an environmental standard for environmental quality
- Esquel Airport (IATA airport code: EQS), Esquel, Chubut Province, Argentina

== See also ==
- EQ (disambiguation)
