= ECCE =

Ecce is the Latin word meaning behold. It occurs in the following phrases:

- Ecce homo, Behold the man, the words used by Pontius Pilate when he presents a scourged Jesus Christ to a hostile crowd (in the late-4th-century Vulgate Latin translation of the Bible).
- Ecce Ancilla Domini!, Behold the handmaiden of the Lord, 1850 painting by Dante Gabriel Rossetti
- Ecce Cor Meum, Behold My Heart, album by Paul McCartney
- Ecce sacerdos magnus, Behold the great priest, in Catholic liturgy

ECCE as an acronym may also refer to:

- European Conference on Cognitive Ergonomics, an academic conference series on human-media interaction and cognitive engineering
- Examination for the Certificate of Competency in English, an English language examination
- Extensible Computational Chemistry Environment, a computer program
- Extracapsular cataract extraction, an ophthalmic surgical procedure

== See also ==
- ECC (disambiguation)
