= Boot knife =

Knife designed to be carried in or on a boot

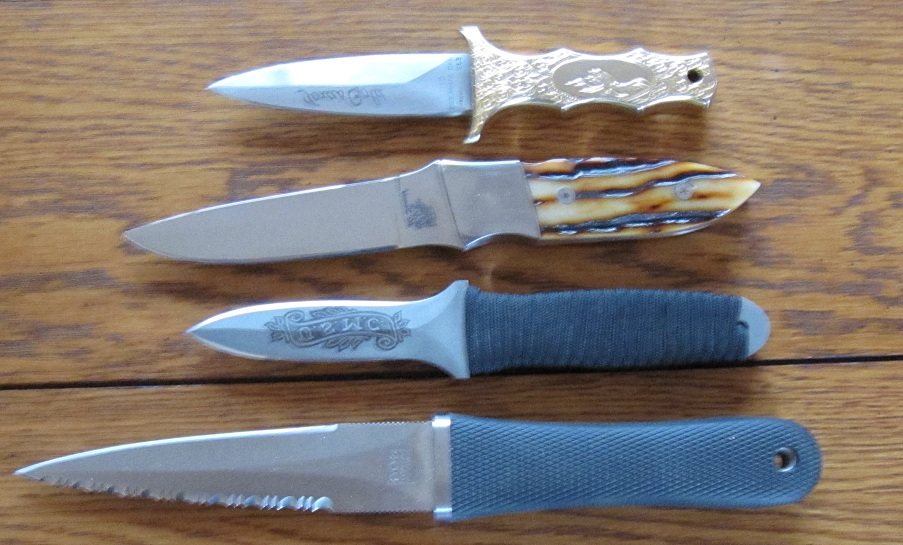
Four boot knives, including a SOG Pentagon, custom stag handled boot knife, Ek knife and Parker Bros knife

A boot knife or a gambler's dagger is a small fixed-blade knife (usually, a dagger) that is designed to be carried in or on a boot. Typically, such a knife is worn on a belt or under a pant leg. If worn around the neck (by means of a chain or lanyard) they become a neck knife. Boot knives generally come with a sheath that includes some form of a clip. Most have double-edged blades, like a dagger, that range from 3 to 5 inches (7.62 to 12.7 cm).

== Legal issues ==
A boot-knife carries with it a multitude of legal issues, as each defining factor is likely to cause legal trouble in certain jurisdictions. Some regions prohibit carrying fixed-blade knives, double edged knives (dirk or dagger), concealed knives, or knives over certain length.

== Manufacturers ==
Boot knives have been made by companies such as Blackjack Knives, Ek Knives, Valor Cutlery, Gerber Legendary Blades, Kershaw Knives, Parker Bros., and Cold Steel.
