= Botanical name =

Scientific name for a plant, alga or fungus

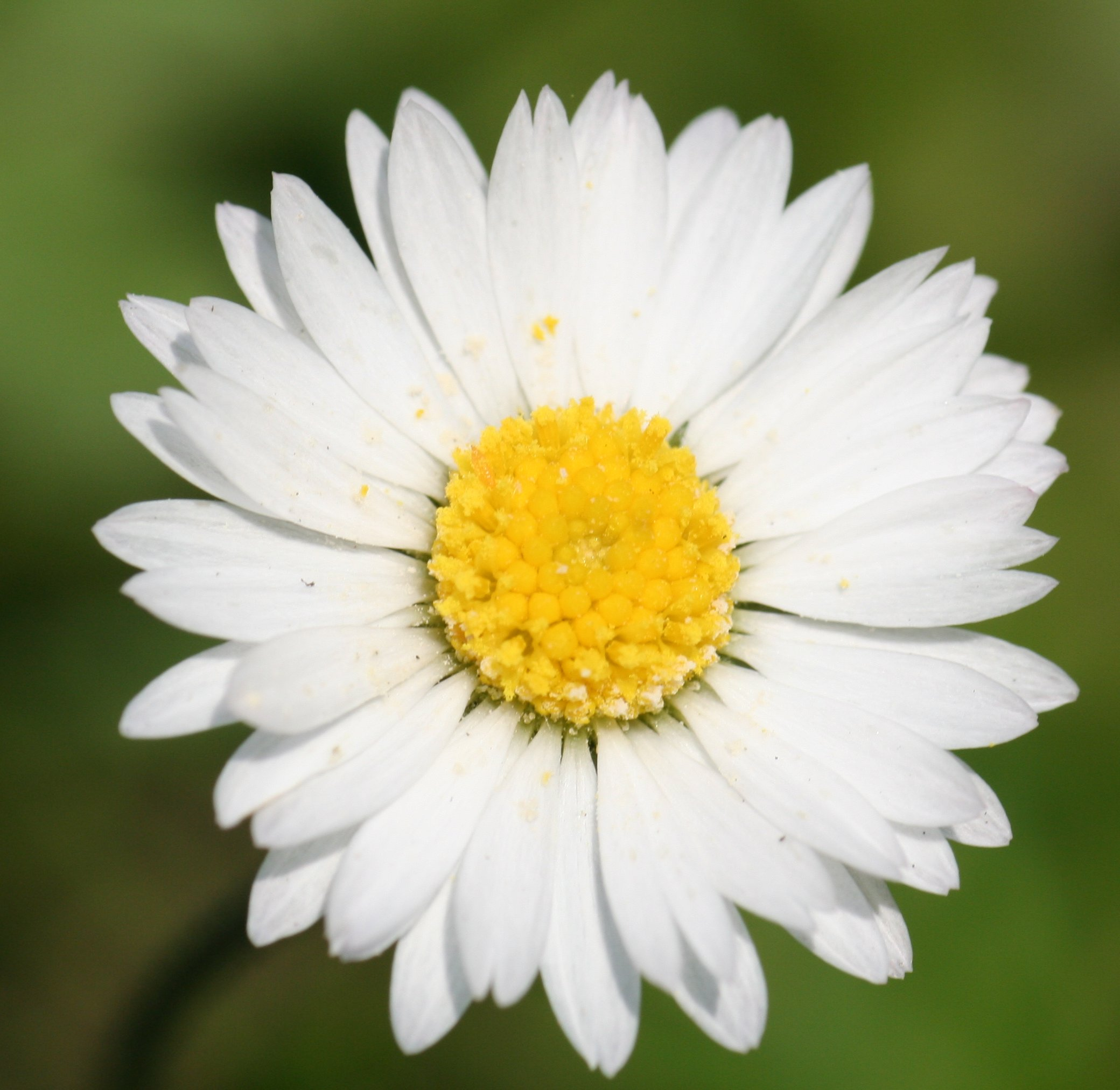
Bellis perennis has one botanical name and many common names, including perennial daisy, lawn daisy, common daisy, and English daisy.

A botanical name is a formal scientific name conforming to the International Code of Nomenclature for algae, fungi, and plants (ICN) and, if it concerns a plant cultigen, the additional cultivar or Group epithets must conform to the International Code of Nomenclature for Cultivated Plants (ICNCP). The code of nomenclature covers "all organisms traditionally treated as algae, fungi, or plants, whether fossil or non-fossil, including blue-green algae (Cyanobacteria), chytrids, oomycetes, slime moulds and photosynthetic protists with their taxonomically related non-photosynthetic groups (but excluding Microsporidia)."

The purpose of a formal name is to have a single name that is accepted and used worldwide for a particular plant or plant group. For example, the botanical name Bellis perennis denotes a plant species which is native to most of the countries of Europe and the Middle East, where it has accumulated various names in many languages. Later, the plant was introduced worldwide, bringing it into contact with more languages. English names for this plant species include: daisy, English daisy, and lawn daisy. The cultivar Bellis perennis 'Aucubifolia' is a golden-variegated horticultural selection of this species.

== Type specimens and circumscription ==
The botanical name itself is fixed by a type, which is a particular specimen (or in some cases a group of specimens) of an organism to which the scientific name is formally attached. In other words, a type is an example that serves to anchor or centralize the defining features of that particular taxon.

The usefulness of botanical names is limited by the fact that taxonomic groups are not fixed in size; a taxon may have a varying circumscription, depending on the taxonomic system, thus, the group that a particular botanical name refers to can be quite small according to some people and quite big according to others. For example, the traditional view of the family Malvaceae has been expanded in some modern approaches to include what were formerly considered to be several closely related families. Some botanical names refer to groups that are very stable (for example Equisetaceae, Magnoliaceae) while for other names a careful check is needed to see which circumscription is being used (for example Fabaceae, Amygdaloideae, Taraxacum officinale).

== Forms of plant names ==
Depending on rank, botanical names may be in one part (genus and above), two parts (various situations below the rank of genus) or three parts (below the rank of species). The names of cultivated plants are not necessarily similar to the botanical names, since they may instead involve "unambiguous common names" of species or genera. Cultivated plant names may also have an extra component, bringing a maximum of four parts:

in one part
Plantae (the plants)
Marchantiophyta (the liverworts)
Magnoliopsida (class including the family Magnoliaceae)
Liliidae (subclass including the family Liliaceae)
Pinophyta (the conifers)
Fagaceae (the beech family)
Betula (the birch genus)

in two parts
Acacia subg. Phyllodineae (the wattles)
lchemilla subsect. Heliodrosium
Berberis thunbergii (Japanese barberry) a species name, i.e., a combination consisting of a genus name and one epithet
Syringa 'Charisma' – a cultivar within a genus
Hydrangea Lacecap Group – a genus name and Group epithet
Lilium Darkest Red Group – a genus name and Group epithet
Paphiopedilum Greenteaicecreamandraspberries grex
snowdrop 'John Gray' – an unambiguous common name for the genus Galanthus and a cultivar epithet

in three parts
Calystegia sepium subsp. americana (American hedge bindweed), a combination consisting of a genus name and two epithets
Crataegus azarolus var. pontica (a Mediterranean hawthorn)
Bellis perennis 'Aucubifolia' – a cultivar
Brassica oleracea Gemmifera Group – a species name and Group epithet

in four parts
Scilla hispanica var. campanulata 'Rose Queen' – a cultivar within a botanical variety
apart from cultivars, the name of a plant can never have more than three parts.

== Components of plant names ==
A botanical name in three parts, i.e., an infraspecific name (a name for a taxon below the rank of species) needs a "connecting term" to indicate rank. In the Calystegia example above, this is "subsp.", an abbreviation for subspecies. In botany there are many ranks below that of species (in zoology there is only one such rank, subspecies, so that this "connecting term" is not used in zoology). A name of a "subdivision of a genus" also needs a connecting term (in the Acacia example above, this is "subg.", an abbreviation for subgenus). The connecting term is not part of the name itself.

A taxon may be indicated by a listing in more than three parts: "Saxifraga aizoon var. aizoon subvar. brevifolia f. multicaulis subf. surculosa Engl. & Irmsch." but this is a classification, not a formal botanical name. The botanical name is Saxifraga aizoon subf. surculosa Engl. & Irmsch. (ICN Art 24: Ex 1).

Generic, specific, and infraspecific botanical names are usually printed in italics. The example set by the ICN is to italicize all botanical names, including those above genus, though the ICN preface states: "The Code sets no binding standard in this respect, as typography is a matter of editorial style and tradition not of nomenclature". Most peer-reviewed scientific botanical publications do not italicize names above the rank of genus, and non-botanical scientific publications do not, which is in keeping with two of the three other kinds of scientific name: zoological and bacterial (viral names above genus are italicized, a new policy adopted in the early 1990s).

=== Binary name ===
For botanical nomenclature, the ICN prescribes a two-part name or binary name for any taxon below the rank of genus down to, and including, the rank of species. Taxa below the rank of species get a three part (infraspecific name).

A binary name consists of the name of a genus and an epithet.

- In the case of a species this is a specific epithet:

Bellis perennis is the name of a species, in which perennis is the specific epithet. There is no connecting term involved to indicate the rank.

- In the case of a subdivision of a genus (subgenus, section, subsection, series, subseries, etc.) the name consists of the name of a genus and a subdivisional epithet. A connecting term should be placed before the subdivisional epithet to indicate the rank:

Paraserianthes sect. Falcataria

=== In cultivated plants ===
In the case of cultivated plants, there is an additional epithet which is an often non-Latin part, not written in italics. For cultivars, it is always given in single quotation marks. The cultivar, Group, or grex epithet may follow either the botanical name of the species, or the name of the genus only, or the unambiguous common name of the genus or species. The generic name, followed by a cultivar name, is often used when the parentage of a particular hybrid cultivar is not relevant in the context, or is uncertain.

== See also ==
(specific to botany)

- Author citation (botany)
- Botanical nomenclature
- Correct name (botany)
- Hybrid name (botany)
- International Association for Plant Taxonomy
- International Plant Names Index
- The Plant List
- Validly published name (botany)
- World Checklist of Selected Plant Families

(more general)

- Glossary of scientific naming
- Biological classification
- Binomial nomenclature
- Nomenclature codes
- Open nomenclature
- Plant epithet
- Taxonomy
- Undescribed species

== Bibliography ==
- Pavord, Anna (2005). The naming of names the search for order in the world of plants. New York: Bloomsbury. ISBN 9781596919655.
