= Plant epithet =

Name used to label a person or group with some perceived quality of a plant

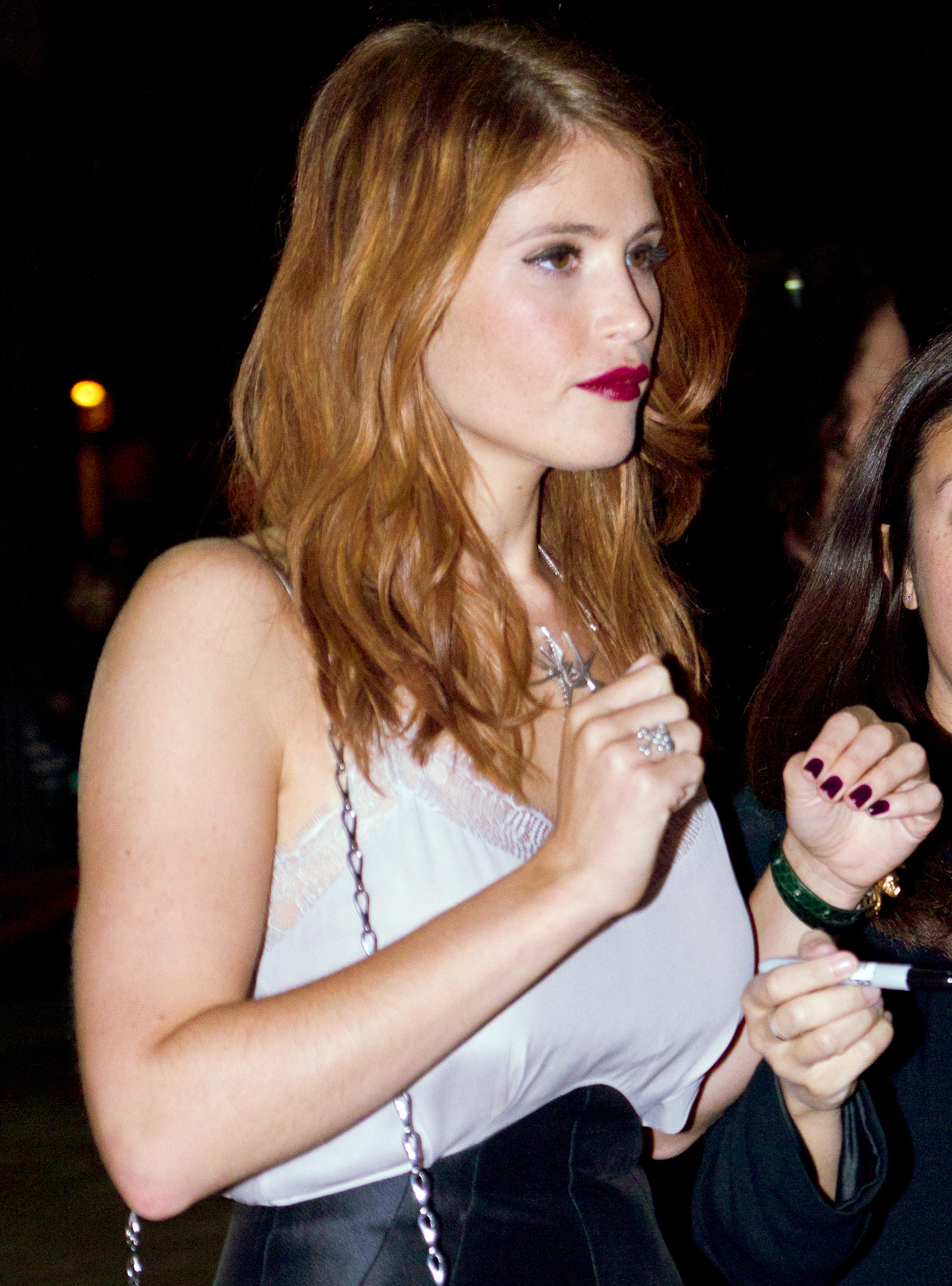
The actress Gemma Arterton, an "English rose"

A plant epithet is a name used to label a person or group, by association with some perceived quality of a plant. Vegetable epithets may be pejorative, such as turnip, readily giving offence, or positive, such as rose or other flowers implying beauty. Tree and flower forenames such as Hazel, Holly, Jasmine and Rose are commonly given to girls. Tree surnames such as Oakes (Oak) and Nash (Ash) are toponymic, given to a person in the Middle Ages who lived in a place near a conspicuous tree. A few plant surnames such as Pease and Onions are metonymic, for sellers of peas and onions respectively. Finally, plant surnames are sometimes emblematic, as in the name Rose, used as a family emblem.

== Vegetable insults ==
Plant epithets may be pejorative, used humorously and sometimes offensively. Some plant epithets are used directly as insults, as when people are called turnips, potatoes, or cabbages. When the England football team lost to Sweden under Graham Taylor, The Sun newspaper led with the headline "Swedes 2 Turnips 1", swede being a pun on a particular vegetable, and turnip being an insult. In English, the collective term vegetable is also pejorative. Plant epithets are used around the world, but the choice of plants and their meanings vary. Thus in China, "stupid melon" is used as an insult. In Britain, coconut is sometimes used by black people to insult other people of colour; the term indicates betrayal, as coconuts are brown on the outside but white on the inside. Trembling or quaking like an aspen leaf means shaking with fear; this may be descriptive or pejorative, and is recorded from around 1700 onwards, starting with Edward Taylor's Poems. In 2022, the British prime minister Liz Truss was described as "Lettuce Liz" and "The Iceberg Lady", (Note: "Iceberg" is a type of lettuce.) her short term in office compared unfavourably to the shelf life of a head of lettuce.

== Flower and tree names ==
In contrast to vegetable epithets, flower and tree names are generally positive. "English rose" has traditionally been used to describe an attractive English woman with a fair complexion. An early documented usage is in Basil Hood's 1902 comic opera Merrie England, while in modern times, the actress Gemma Arterton has been so described.

Flower and tree names are used in many countries for girls; examples in English include Bryony, Daisy, Iris, Hazel, Heather, Holly, Hyacinth, Jasmine, Lily, Rose, and Violet. Forms of the generic term flower are also popular in English as in other languages, including for example Fleur, Flora, Florence and Flores. English flower names are less common for boys, but include Hawthorn; in the form of May, the same flower is used as a girl's name. Laurel, for a victor's wreath made of the sweet bay or laurel, with feminine forms such as Laura, is used for both boys and girls.

== Plant surnames ==
People acquired plant surnames in the Middle Ages for different reasons. Toponymic surnames were given to people who lived by a significant feature such as a large isolated tree, a group of trees, or a wood: or, very often, in a village beside such a feature. Metonymic surnames, on the other hand, denoted a person's profession, and include Pease, for a seller of peas, and Onions, for a seller of onions (though some people with that surname got it from the Old Welsh name Enniaum).

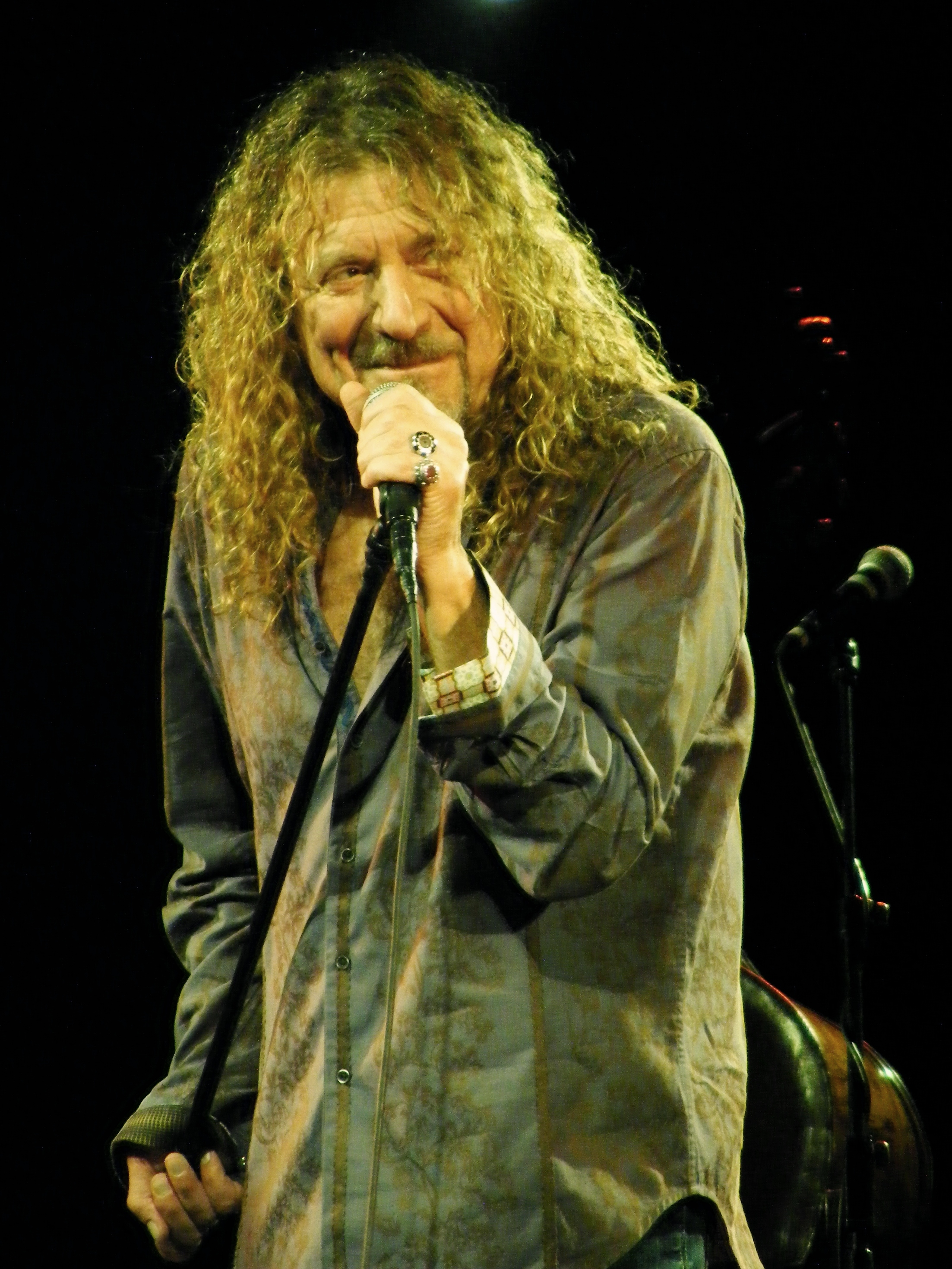
Robert Plant, lead singer of Led Zeppelin. The surname may be metonymic for a gardener or toponymic for an orchard or a town in France.

Plant or Plante itself may be a metonym (gardener), as with Plantebene (a grower of beans, 1199) and Planterose (a grower of roses, 1221), a metaphor meaning a branch of a family, or a toponym, as with de la Plaunt (1273) and de Plantes (1275, 1282), from a place in France such as le Plantis (Orne), or from a planted place such as a vineyard or orchard.

Toponymic surnames include Oak, with variants such as Oake, Oke, Oakes, Noke and Roke since 1273, Ash, with variations such as Ashe, Asche, Aish, Esch and Nash since 1221, and Birch or Birchwood, since 1182. Hazel is recorded in many toponymic surnames (sometimes via villages named for the tree), including Hazel itself from 1182, Hazelwood/Aizlewood, Hazelton, Hazelhurst, Hazelgrove, Hazelden and Heseltine. Surnames such as Hollies and Hollin(g)s, since 1275, mean a person who lived by a holly or holm oak tree. Surnames such as Plumtree, Plumpton, and Plumstead denote people who lived in places by a plum tree or orchard. Similarly, Appleby, Appleton, Applegarth and Appleyard name people who lived by an apple orchard, or in villages in Cheshire, Cumbria, Kent and Yorkshire which were named for their apple orchards. Surnames including Apps, Asp, Epps and Hesp record that a person lived by an aspen tree, the letters often being swapped over.

A third source of plant names is their use as emblems, as in the surnames Rose, Royce, and Pluckrose, all meaning a person who used the rose as their family emblem. The English royal Plantagenet dynasty appears to have derived its name from the use of a sprig of broom or planta genista as an emblem. "Plantegenest" (or "Plante Genest") was a 12th-century nickname for Geoffrey Plantagenet, Count of Anjou and duke of Normandy; Richard of York, 3rd Duke of York adopted Plantagenet as his family name in the 15th century, perhaps to emphasise his status as a patrilineal descendant of Geoffrey.

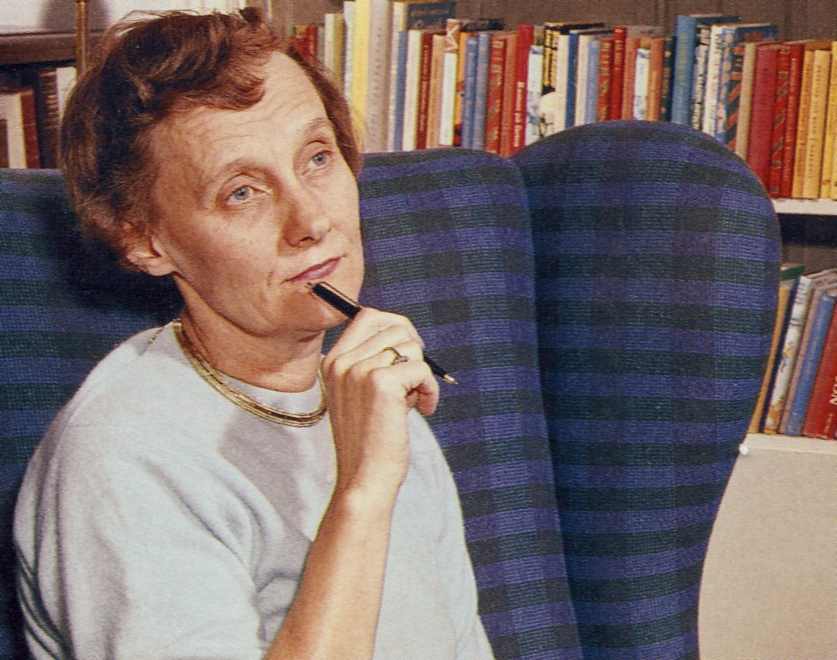
The Swedish author Astrid Lindgren is named for the Lime or Linden tree.

Plant surnames are found in other languages. For example, in Sweden, where "Lind" means the Lime or Linden tree, the 100 most common surnames in 2015 included at 17 Lindberg (Lime-hill), at 21 Lindström (Lime-stream), at 22 Lindqvist (Lime-twig), at 23 Lindgren (Lime-branch), and at 99 Lindholm (Lime-island). Other tree names in the top 100 were 46 Björk (Birch), 56 Löfgren (Leaf-branch), 66 Björklund (Birchwood), 77 Ekström (Oak-stream), 79 Hedlund (Heathwood) and 87 Ek (Oak). Many of these names are toponymic; however, suffixes like -gren and -qvist are often metaphorical, meaning an offshoot of a family. From around 1686, Swedish soldiers started to adopt military surnames; short monosyllabic tree-names like Al (Alder), Alm (Elm) and Ek (Oak) were popular.

In France, the surnames Laplante (the plant) and Levigne (the vine) denote the owner of a vineyard, or may be toponymic. Tree names also occur in France, where for example the surname Chene (oak) is not uncommon in Loire-Atlantique and Maine-et-Loire.

== See also ==
- Animal epithet

== Sources ==
- Mills, A. D. (1993). A Dictionary of English Place-Names. Oxford University Press. ISBN 0-192-83131-3.
- Reaney, P. H.; Wilson, R. M. (1997). A Dictionary of English Surnames. Oxford University Press. ISBN 0-198-60092-5.
