= Murphy Knives =

American knife manufacturer

Murphy Knives was a knife manufacturing company founded by custom knife maker David "Dave" Zephaniah Murphy. Murphy was best known as the original supplier of knives to the Gerber Legendary Blade Knife Company in 1938. Murphy's knives had a distinctive aluminum handle which was later used on many thousands of Gerber knives. Between 1941 and 1954 Murphy made approximately 90,000 Murphy Combat knives for troops to use in World War II. These knives were marked on the handle Murphy Combat with USA on the obverse side. They were made for servicemen during and after World War II. These knives are now collectible by military knife collectors and are scarce despite the large number made.

Murphy Knives also made about one hundred knives a year of a lesser known model called the Clause Combat knife. This knife was unmarked and similar to the Murphy Combat knife with a narrower blade. These Clause Combat knives were made from left-over parts from Murphy Combat knives between 1942 and 1949 by Mr. Clause, a neighbor of the Murphys in Oregon.

A cased commemorative copy of the Murphy Combat knife, with an etched blade, was issued by John Ek Knives out of Richmond, Virginia in the early 1990s but due to the etching is distinguishable from the originals.

Dave Murphy has produced a number of knives in small series or individually.
