= Hedlund =

Hedlund is a surname of Swedish origin. Notable people with the surname include:

- Andreas Hedlund (born 1973), Swedish vocalist, musician and producer
- Andy Hedlund (born 1978), American former ice hockey defenseman
- Bob Hedlund (born 1961), American politician, former member of the Massachusetts Senate
- Cole Hedlund (born 1995), American former football placekicker
- Dennis M. Hedlund (born 1947), American actor, comedian, newscaster and disc jockey
- Frederick Hedlund (1887–1971), American middle-distance runner
- Garrett Hedlund (born 1984), American actor
- Gustav A. Hedlund (1904–1993), American mathematician
- Göthe Hedlund (1918–2003), Swedish speed skater
- Gunnar Hedlund (1900–1989), Swedish politician
- Guy Hedlund (1884–1964), American actor of the silent era
- Hanna Hedlund (born 1975), Swedish singer, sister of Lina Hedlund
- Henric Hedlund (born 1945), Swedish retired ice hockey player
- Irene Hedlund, (born 1947), Danish book illustrator and children's writer
- Lars Hedlund (1949–2016), Swedish strongman who competed in three World's Strongest Man contests
- Lina Hedlund (born 1978), Swedish singer, member of the pop group Alcazar, sister of Hanna Hedlund
- Lotta Hedlund (born 1944), African-American singer, widow of Svenne Hedlund
- Mike Hedlund (born 1946), American retired Major League Baseball pitcher
- Per-Erik Hedlund (1897–1975), Swedish cross country skier
- Simon Hedlund (born 1993), Swedish footballer
- Stieg Hedlund (born 1965), American video game designer, artist and writer
- Svenne Hedlund (1945–2022), Swedish pop singer
- Sven Adolf Hedlund (1821–1900), Swedish newspaper publisher and politician
- Viktor Hedlund (1853–1922), Finnish politician
