= European College of Kosovo =

High school in Kosovo

Coordinates: 42.6609°N 21.1665°E

The European College of Kosovo, also referred to as ECK, is a higher education institution located in the center of Pristina, Kosovo.

== History ==
The college was established in 2013 by local and international professors and it is affiliated with the EU Business School, formerly known as European University in Barcelona. For the academic year 2014/15 classes are taught in Albanian, and all the students are enrolled in bachelor's degree programs. For the academic year 2015/16 the European College of Kosovo's strategic plan is to open doors for international students and offer programs in English language too. European College of Kosovo main mission is "Creation of new European values, for a better future".

Training Centre and professional services is a special unit of the trainings and professional development in different scientific and professional fields within the European college of Kosovo.

International certifications and recognitions from the Centre for trainings and professional development of the European College of Kosovo: Some of the international certifications and recognitions of trainings and testing for which the Centre of trainings and professional development of the European College of Kosovo is licensed are: Pearson Test of English General and Pearson Test of English young Learners.

== Programs ==
1. Economics and Managements (180)

Spezialization:

  1. Management
  2. Banking, Finance and Accounting
  3. Information Technology in Business
1. General Law (240)
  1. General Law

== See also ==
- EU Business School
- Pristina
- Kosovo
