= Extended coverage =

Insurance for additional risks

Extended coverage is a term used in the property insurance business. All insurance policies have exclusions for specific causes of loss (also called "perils") that are not covered by the insurance company. An extended coverage endorsement (EC) was a common extension of property insurance beyond coverage for fire and lightning. Extended coverage added insurance against loss by the perils of windstorm, hail, explosion, civil commotion, riot and riot attending a strike, aircraft damage, vehicle damage, and smoke damage.

The endorsement has been largely supplanted by what is referred to as "basic" causes-of-loss form first introduced by Insurance Services Office in 1986 as part of its simplified language revisions. The basic form includes most of the perils previously provided by fire and extended coverage and it adds vandalism and malicious mischief, sprinkler leakage damage, sinkhole collapse, and volcanic action. Coverage can also be extended on scheduled personal articles or applied as extensions to personal umbrella liability or extended title.

Broader coverage is available in "broad form" and "special form" causes-of-loss forms. Broad form adds three additional perils plus collapse due to certain causes. Special form covers almost all risks of loss except those that are specifically excluded.

There are many types of extended coverage and this is only a partial list.

Types of Extended Insurance Coverage

- Personal Umbrella Liability – You can add between $1 million to $5 million of liability coverage over and above your current policy limits, and with no deductible. While this is a valuable addition to your Home policy, the extended liability coverage also applies to your auto, seasonal, watercraft policies and more
- Flood Insurance – You may be particularly interested if you live in an area prone to flooding like near the coast because floods caused by hurricanes are usually not covered
- Hailstorm – Unless hail is explicitly covered by your basic homeowners policy (obviously particularly where hail is commonplace)
- Earthquake – This is usually only partially covered, or not at all by a conventional policy
- Extended Title – is an extended coverage because there are many things not covered by basic title insurance policies
- Medical – Covers illnesses and lengths of stay not covered by the basic medical or health care policy
- Dental – will help pay for some or partially covered dental surgeries
- Escape of fuel oil – If you use oil to heat your home, this optional insurance covers you for damages caused by oil leaking from your tank
- Water – Insures sewer backup and other water damage caused by overflow of outside drains or sewers
- Scheduled personal articles – Special limits are set on items like jeweler or fine arts. If these items are worth more than the limit specified, you may want to insure them for additional monies

== See also ==
- Insurable risk
- Flood insurance
