= European Commodity Clearing =

Company based in Germany

European Commodity Clearing AG
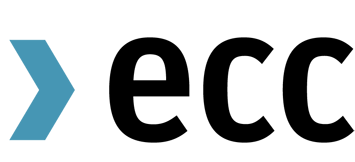
- Founded: 2006
- Headquarters: Leipzig, Germany
- Key people: Dr. Ralf Prinzler (CRO, deputy CEO), Dr. Götz Dittrich (COO), Jens Rick (CIO), Heike Eckert (Chairwoman of Supervisory Board)
- Products: Clearing and settlement services for energy and other commodities
- Website: www.ecc.de

European Commodity Clearing (ECC) is the leading clearing house for energy and commodity products in Europe and the central clearing house for the Global Commodity Exchange, part of the European Energy Exchange (EEX) Group. ECC assumes the counterparty risk and guarantees the physical and financial settlement of transactions, providing security and cross-margining benefits for its customers. As part of EEX Group, ECC provides clearing services for EEX, EEX Asia and EPEX SPOT with additional services provided to Power Exchange Central Europe (PXE). In addition, ECC also provides clearing services for the partner exchanges HUPX, HUDEX, NOREXECO, SEEPEX and SEMOpx.

== Foundation ==
ECC was established as a subsidiary of the European Energy Exchange (EEX) in 2006. In this context, EEX transferred its clearing activities to ECC. The aim has been to provide clearing services for partner exchanges as well. As a first step in this direction, on 5 July 2006, the European Energy Exchange AG (EEX) and the Amsterdam-based European Energy Derivatives Exchange N.V. (ENDEX) announced they would cooperate in the settlement of energy trading transactions. This cooperation agreement constituted ECC's first step towards a clearing house working for several exchanges. ECC acts as central counterparty for the exchanges of EEX group and further partner exchange. Currently, 10 partner exchange use the clearing and settlement services of ECC.

== Services ==
Currently, ECC provides clearing services for the Partner Exchanges EEX Asia, European Energy Exchange (EEX), EPEX SPOT, Hungarian Derivative Energy Exchange (HUDEX), Hungarian Power Exchange (HUPX), Norexeco, Powernext, POWER EXCHANGE CENTRAL EUROPE (PXE), SEEPEX and SEMOpx.

Overall, ECC provides clearing and settlement services for the following products:

- Power (Germany, France, Austria, Switzerland, Belgium, the Netherlands, Great Britain, Hungary)
- Natural Gas (Germany, France, the Netherlands, Austria)
- Emission allowances (EUA, CER, EUAA)
- Pulp (NBSK & BHKP)

== Expansion of the product offerings ==
- November 2008: ECC now provides clearing and settlement for natural gas contracts traded on the French exchange Powernext SA.
- April 2009: The clearing and settlement of all French power spot and derivatives contracts within the framework of the cooperation between EEX and Powernext is now assumed by ECC.
- October 2009: ECC assumes clearing and settlement for UK Power Futures.
- December 2009: ECC assumes clearing and settlement services for the new gas market in Austria. The trade is executed on the stock exchange systems of the Vienna Stock Exchange, delivery point is the Central European Gas Hub (CEGH).
- July 2010: ECC also acts as a clearing house for the newly built HUPX Hungarian Power Exchange and takes over the clearing and settlement of transactions concluded on HUPX electricity spot market in the framework of this cooperation.
- December 2010: Clearing is extended by derivative market products.
- July 2011: ECC takes over the clearing for HUPX electricity futures.
- February 2013: EEX group continues expanding its Trade Registration Services to offer more products that are not traded on the EEX or ECC partner exchanges.
- June 2013: EEX offers trading in Guarantees of Origin (GoOs). These certificates prove that one megawatt hour of electricity was generated from renewable energy sources. ECC takes over clearing and settlement of the trades.
- September 2013: ECC assumes clearing and settlement of all trades completed at the Prague-based Power Exchange Central Europe (PXE).
- December 2013: ECC and the Norwegian NOREXECO AS have agreed to cooperate in commodity trading, clearing and settlement and have concluded a cooperation agreement for that purpose.
- December 2013: EEX has become the majority shareholder of the Singaporean Futures Exchange Clear Trade Exchange (CLTX). The aim is to build a new global supply of raw materials. The CLTX supplements the existing products of the EEX with products such as freight, iron ore, fuel oil and fertilizers.

== Resources ==
- ECC Website

Partner exchanges:

- EEX Website
- Powernext Website
- EPEX Spot Website
- CEGH Website
- HUPX Website
