= Van Eck (disambiguation) =

Van Eck is a Dutch surname.

Van Eck may also refer to:

- VanEck, an American investment management firm
- Van Eck Professor of Engineering, a chair at Cambridge University
- Van Eck radiation
- Van Eck phreaking
- Van Eck Redoubt, a fort in Sri Lanka
- Hendrik Van Eck Airport, in South Africa
- Van Eck Trailers, trailer manufacturer in the Netherlands
