= AMSilk =

German material science company

AMSilk is an industrial supplier of synthetic silk biopolymers. The polymers are biocompatible and breathable. The company was founded in 2008 and has its headquarters at Campus Neuried in Munich. AMSilk is an industrial biotechnology company with a proprietary production process for their silk materials.

AMSilk produces a lightweight material trademarked as Biosteel, created from recombinant spider silk, which was used by Adidas to create a biodegradable running shoe. Jens Klein, former CEO of AMSilk, said during an interview that the biodegradable material can help reduce the amount of waste that has to be burned or pollutes the environment.

AMSilk is also developing breast implants made of biodegradable spider silk in collaboration with the German company Polytech.

== History ==
AMSilk was founded in 2008 by Lin Römer and Professor Thomas Scheibel in Planegg, Germany, with the aim of becoming the world's first industrial supplier of synthetic silk biopolymers.

In 2011, the company partnered with the Fraunhofer Institute for Applied Polymer Research (IAP) to develop a new spin process for the AMSilk spider silk proteins.

In 2015, AMSilk began producing Biosteel Fibre made from 100% silk proteins based on natural spider silk. Then, in November 2016, the company used its Biosteel Fibre to collaborate with Adidas to create the ‘Futurecraft Biofabric’ shoe prototype. The Biosteel Yarn fibre-based shoe is 100% biodegradable and is designed to replicate spider silk.

In April 2017, AMSilk announced its partnership with Gruschwitz Textilwerke.

In 2019, Swiss cosmetics manufacturer Givaudan acquired the cosmetics arm of AMSilk to expand the use of spider silk technology in cosmetic products.

In May 2021, the company secured a EUR 29 Million Series C fundraising. In April 2023 AMSilk raised an additional €25 million to accelerate industrial scale-up and expand commercial operations.

In February 2023, Evonik Industries signed a contract with AMSilk to supply industrial quantities of protein products made from the fermentation of renewable raw materials.

In 2023, AMSilk partnered with Brain Biotech, a company that develops and manufactures bio-based products for industry, to develop bio-based protein fibres for the textile industry.

Founding and Development

AMSilk has developed a range of silk biopolymers designed for application in various medical devices, focusing on enhancing the bio-compatibility of medical implants.

In 2017, AMSilk was named one of the 50 most innovative companies in the world by the German edition of MIT Technology Review.

In 2018, AMSilk signed a deal with Airbus to develop a spider silk-based material for lightweight, high-performance planes. The collaboration aimed to launch the first prototype composite material in 2019.

Within the same year, the company partnered with Polytech Health & Aesthetics, the leading manufacturer of silicone implants, to begin a clinical trial of silk-coated implants on a handful of patients in Austria.

== Headquarters ==
AMSilk is currently located at Campus Neuried in Munich, Germany, after relocating in October 2022.

== Products and services ==
AMSilk partnered with Swiss watchmaker Omega SA in 2019 to make the Nato watch strap, which blends polyamide and Biosteel.

In January 2022, Mercedes-Benz partnered with AMSilk to develop sustainable door pulls using Biosteel fibre on its VISION EQXX concept electric car.

Since announcing its partnership with Airbus in 2018, AMSilk has worked on developing silk-reinforced polymers as a substitute for Carbon-fiber-reinforced polymers (CFRPs).

== Environmental impact ==
AMSilk has worked with fashion brands to create sustainable alternatives using a biosynthetic silk made by adding silk genes into bacteria through biofermentation. This material has been used in collaboration with Omega and Adidas for a watch strap and the "Futurecraft" shoe. AMSilk's Biosteel Fiber, used in these collaborations is notable for its biodegradability, breaking down in seawater and on land within a few months.

Utilizing a bio-fabrication process that reprograms microorganisms based on spider DNA, the company produces this silk-like material at scale using bacteria and natural fermentation.

In November 2022, AMSilk participated as one of 100 renowned companies in the VISION 2045 Summit held alongside the United Nations Climate Change Conference (COP27).
