= Ek =

Ek is a Swedish surname, meaning 'oak tree'.

People with the surname Ek include:

- Anders Ek (1916–1979), Swedish actor
- Daniel Ek (born 1983), Swedish businessman and CEO of Spotify
- Elin Ek (actress) (born 1976), Swedish radio, television presenter and producer
- Elin Ek (cross-country skier) (born 1973), Swedish cross-country skier
- Lena Ek, Swedish politician
- Lisa Ek (born 1982), Swedish former football midfielder
- Malin Ek (born 1945), Swedish actress
- Mats Ek (born 1945), dancer, choreographer and stage director
- Phil Ek, American record producer
- Torbjörn Ek (1949–2010), Swedish bandy and football player and manager

Ek is also part of the names of the following people:

- Eknath (1533–1599), Ek Nāth, or Eka Nātha, Indian Hindu saint, philosopher, and poet
- Ek Boonsawad (born 1988), Thai windsurfer
- Ek Rangsiroj (born 1974), Thai actor
- Ix Ek' Naah, Maya queen of the Kaan kingdom in Campeche, Mexico

== See also ==
- Plant epithet#Plant surnames, where Ek is discussed
