= Neck knife =

Knife worn on a cord hanging from a person's neck

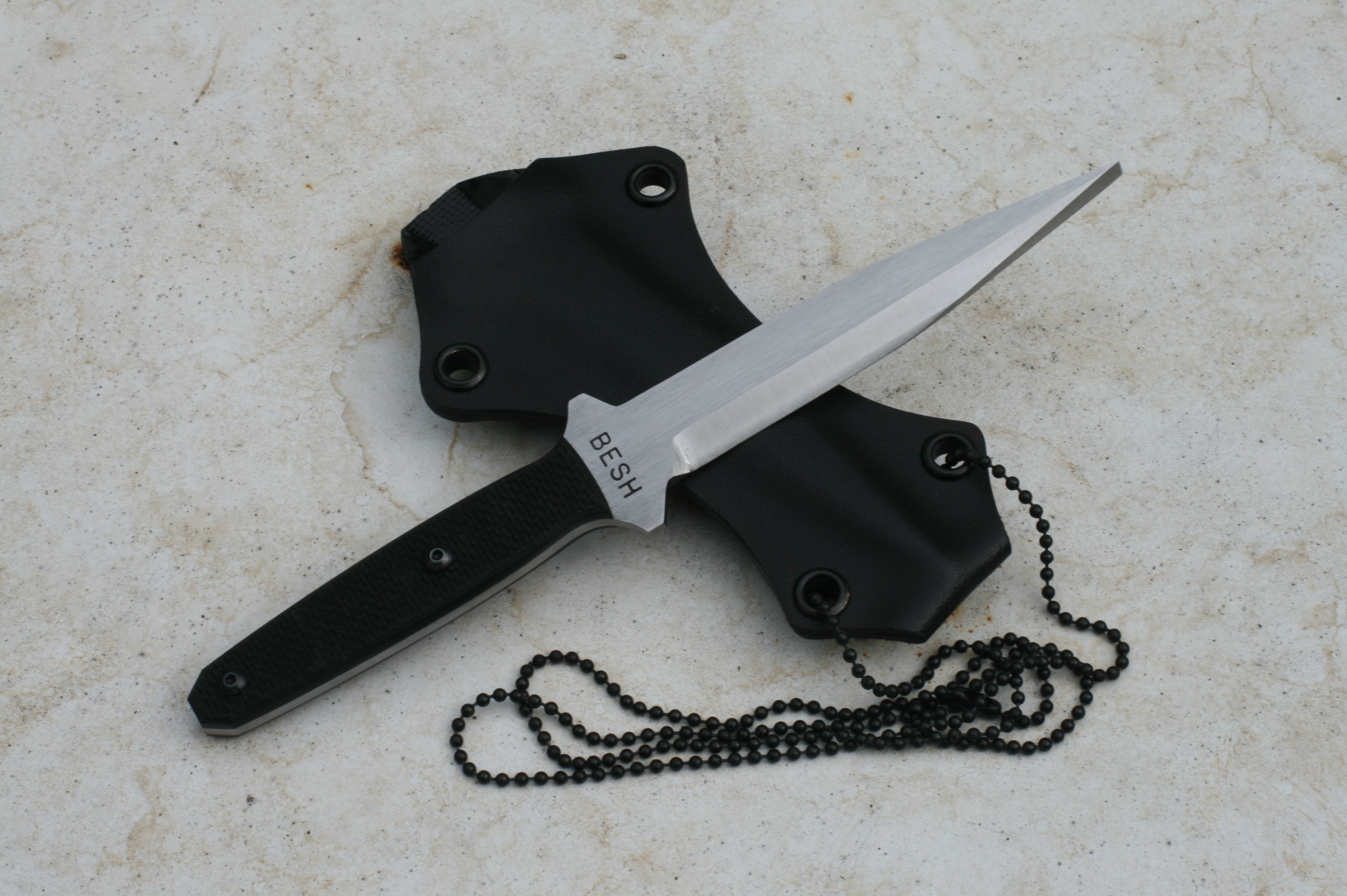
Neck knife

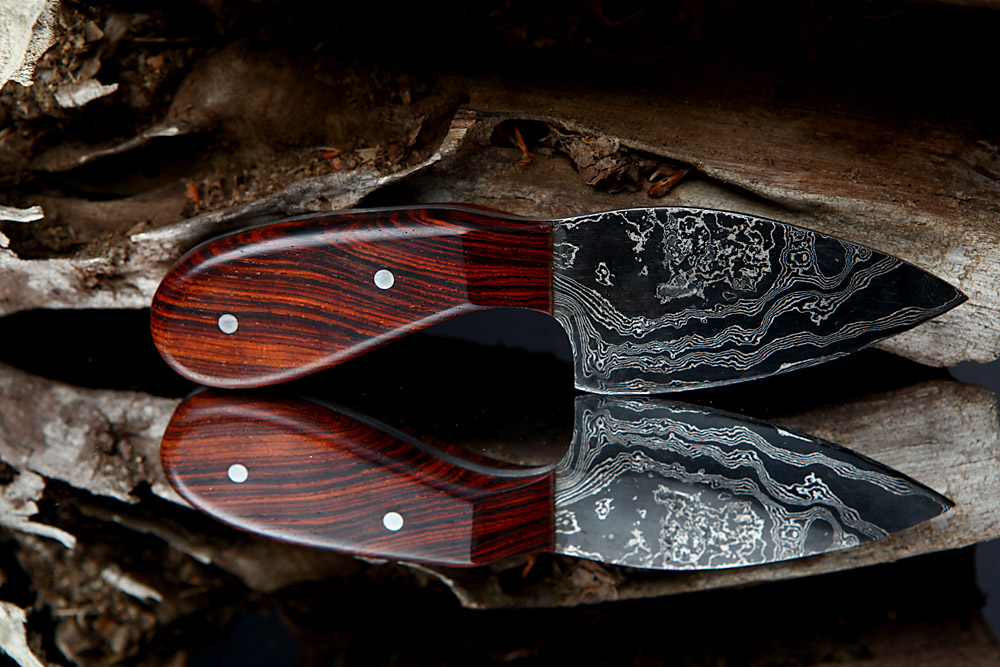
Neck knife of Damascus steel

A neck knife is a knife worn on a cord hanging from a person's neck. It usually means a small fixed-blade knife which is carried by means of a cord, by which the knife sheath is suspended from around one's neck. They can either hang handle up ("mountain man style") or handle down. The knife may be hung from a loop of natural or synthetic cord, a length of braided paracord, a leather thong, or even a breakaway beaded or ball chain such as those utilized for military dog tags.

The upside-down carry knife often stays in place by means of a form-fitting synthetic sheath, which holds it securely in place until yanked sharply. Some manufacturers prefer a looser fitting sheath augmented with magnets. When carried handle up, a normal style leather sheath can be used. When drawing the knife from this sort of carry, the off side hand holds the sheath while the dominant hand pulls the knife free.

Neck knives are usually single-edged, with blade lengths typically under four inches, and frequently less than three inches. They are primarily intended for utilitarian use, although non-utilitarian versions (i.e., daggers and T-handled push daggers) also exist.

Neck knives are most frequently worn around the neck, but may be suspended from under the arm as well. They are sometimes worn under one's shirt for concealment, although this makes a quick draw nearly impossible, and even simple retrieval for utility purposes awkward. They are more frequently worn outside a shirt. Not only does this make drawing the knife far easier, but it also avoids legal issues in jurisdictions where concealed knives are regulated.

== See also ==
- Everyday carry
- Fighting knife
- Utility knife
