= Viktor Hedlund =

Finnish politician

Viktor Hedlund (27 May 1853 - 4 July 1922 in Helsinki) was a Finnish politician. He was a member of the Senate of Finland.
