= Ek Commando Knife Co. =

American combat knife brand produced by several different companies

Ek Knives
- Product type: Combat knife
- Current owner: Ka-Bar
- Introduced: 1941; 85 years ago
- Previous owners: Ek Commando Knife Co.

Ek Commando Knife Co.
- Historic logo
- Founded: 1941; 85 years ago in Hamden, Connecticut
- Founder: John Ek
- Defunct: 1997
- Fate: Parent company bankrupt; Brand later acquired by Ka-Bar
- Parent: Blackjack Knives (1993-1997)

Ek Commando Knife Co. or Ek Knives is an American combat knife brand produced by several different companies since the original founded by John Ek in 1941. In May 2014 the Ek brand was purchased by Ka-Bar, which began selling its versions of Ek knife designs in 2015. Although not officially issued gear, Ek Knives have seen use by US forces in six major conflicts: World War II, the Korean War, the Vietnam War, the Gulf War, both wars in Afghanistan and the Iraq War. Ek Knives manufactures Bowie-style blades, daggers, and a Fairbairn-Sykes MkII. President Franklin Delano Roosevelt, Clark Gable, and General George S. Patton have been identified as Ek knife owners.

== World War II ==
A knifemaker since 1939, in January 1941, John Ek started producing knives in quantity in Hamden, Connecticut. By 1943 he was making six different styles of knives. By August 1944, demand for his knives had grown to the point where he had three shifts working around the clock seven days a week, to produce 10 different models.

All of the knives made during WWII by Ek were numbered to help the owners keep track of them if they were lost, and because he guaranteed each knife for the lifetime of the original owner. By keeping the original owner's name on record, he could follow up his lifetime guarantee system. Ek had very strong feelings about restricting his knives to active-duty US servicemen.

It is reported that President Franklin D. Roosevelt kept a John Ek Commando Knife on his desk in the White House until the time of his death. General George S. Patton, Jr. owned a John Ek Commando Knife (as did several of his subordinates); Ek eventually named his Model No. 6 the "Patton Knife". Captain Clark Gable, while not necessarily expecting to see combat, purchased a number of Ek Knives while he served.

== Post WWII ==
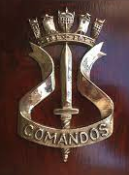
Chilean Marines Commandos Badge with an EK Knife

In 1949 John Ek moved to Miami, Florida where he continued production of his knives. From here he provided knives to American forces during the Korean and Vietnam wars. Miami-produced knives were marked "John Ek Knives, Miami, Fla.", whereas earlier knives bore the "Hamden, Conn." identification.

John Ek died on October 21, 1976, but the business was continued by his son, Gary W. Ek who had worked for his father as a knifemaker since 1971 prior to John Ek's death. Due to the growing crime rate in Miami, the Ek family decided to relocate the operation to St. Augustine until 1982, when they moved it to Richmond, Virginia.

In 1982 Ek Knife President Robert Buerlein took the reins and convinced John's Son and his Mother to move the company to Richmond, VA, with the new company slogan of "Constant Improvement". New knives have been introduced, developed by Gary Ek including the Raider/MCMAP Knife, authorized by the U.S. Marine Raider Association. Handles were made of finely grooved black Micarta and hand-checkered walnut handles were offered as an upgrade. Machined brass X-nut screws to fasten the handle became standard instead of the original poured lead rivets. Blades were ground out of stainless steel and were mirror polished. Ek knives produced lower cost models with a handle made entirely of green or black (and occasionally "desert camo") wrapped parachute cord and a heavy nylon-webbing sheath in a matching color. A number of variants, such as Ek bowie knives, hunting knives, throwing knives, boot knives and reproductions of other WW II patterns such as the Australian bowie and a copy of the Murphy-pattern combat knife were produced. During the 1980s EK Commando knife blades were made by Hattori in Seki Japan but marked Richmond VA. But early and later ones were made in the United States. Since 1992, Chilean Marines Corps Commandos use the EK Knife as combat knife. Also, EK DAgger is part of the Marine Commandos Badge and ChMCSOC.

== Blackjack Knives ==
In 1993 Blackjack Knives bought Ek, and moved production to Blackjack's plant in Effingham, Illinois. Leather scabbards were discontinued to cut costs and the nylon-webbing sheath was instead substituted on all models. As Blackjack endured internal problems, they began producing small lots of different knives marked with the Ek brand in an attempt to catch the knife-buying public's attention. Blackjack went bankrupt in 1997 and sold the remaining stocks of knives to Century International Arms. Some Ek knives made by Blackjack had a label stitched on the back of the nylon sheath reading "Handmade in U.S.A." over "Ek Commando Knife Co" over "Richmond, Virginia."

== KA-BAR Knives and current production ==
In 2014 KA-BAR Knives announced that they would acquire Ek Knife brand and reintroduce Ek-branded knives to the market. Production on the new knives began in 2015, and they remain in production.

These current production knives are branded with both KA-BAR and Ek logos and are generally recognizable as Ek-style knives while sharing few design details with previous generations of the knives. Current production knives are constructed of 1095 steel, and feature black parkerized blades in a variety of styles, including the Model 4 spear point double edged knife and Model 5 clip point Bowie. All models feature glass filled nylon handles that mirror the shape of previous generations. Handles are attached with traditional x-head fasteners. A composite sheath is provided.

== Construction ==
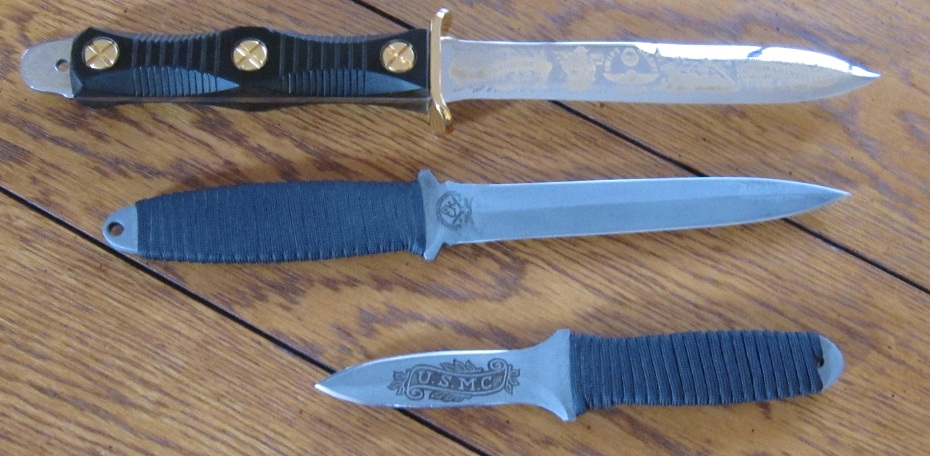

World War 2 in the United States was a time of steel shortages as it was a scarce strategic material. The U.S. Government War Production Board tested and approved the designs of John Ek's knives and authorized continued availability of the nickel-chrome-moly steel which he used. Subsequently, he was admitted to the Army Ordnance Association.

Ek found the nickel-chrome-moly steel to be strong, yet stain and rust resistant. In later years Ek would use Swedish Sandvik stainless steel, upon request. In April or May 1939 John Ek designed the first John Ek Commando Knife which he named the Model No. 1 and that was the only model that he planned to make. The Model No. 1 had a single-edged blade of spearpoint design, with a sharpened false edge extending approximately three inches along the back edge of the blade.

Ek later developed a double-edged version of this named the Model No. 2. He added crossguards to these versions, designating them Models No. 6 and No. 7, respectively (today these are referred to as the No. 3 and No. 4).

Several aspects of Ek's design made the knives distinct and rugged. The knife was made with a full-width, full-length tang (the extension of the blade which runs through the grips) construction. Not only did the tang run the entire length of the grips, but the tang was the full width of the grips. Most knives of the day (even ones made today) had narrow "rat-tail" tangs, many running only one-third the length of the grip. Ek believed his full tang design made the knife inherently stronger.

Ek's knives featured an extended butt, a direct extension of the blade and the blade tang itself protruding beyond the end of the handle slabs anywhere from nearly 1/2 " to 1". This allowed the butt end of the knife to be used as a pry bar for opening ammunition crates or, according to Ek's 1944 manual, Your Silent Partner, for "an upstroke to lay your opponent out." Another use of this extension was to protect both the hand and the wooden grips when the butt was used as a hammer. The extended butt of the Ek Commando Knife may have inspired the design of the "skullcrusher" pommel on the First Special Service Force V-42 stiletto, which appeared in 1943.

Ek preferred wood grips to leather, as the leather was prone to rot under tropical conditions. He found the rock maple grips he chose to be more comfortable and to provide a better grip, especially when the hand was wet with perspiration, than the brass/alloy grips of the British Fairbairn–Sykes fighting knife. The wood grips allowed the owner to custom fit the grip, by sanding, to the exact contour of his hand. For a number of years, Ek included a piece of sandpaper with each knife for this purpose.

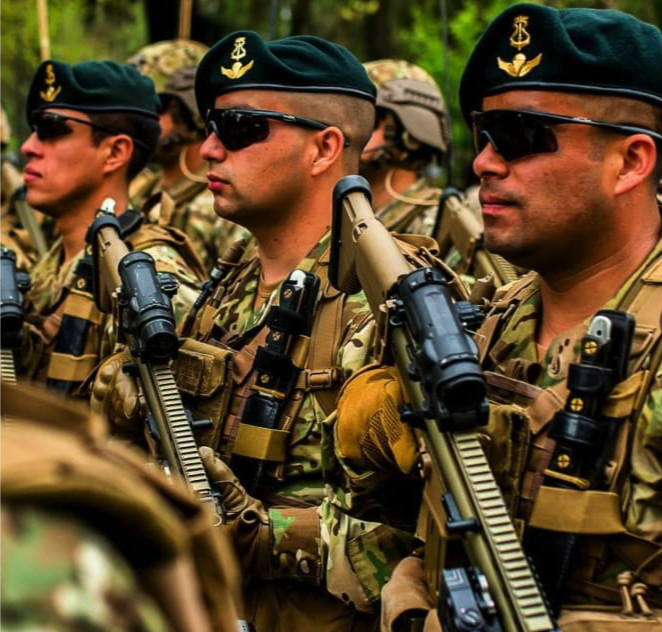
Chilean Marine Corps Special Operations Command

Ek preferred his knives without crossguards for ease of concealment and for quick withdrawal as there was no crossguard to snag on clothing or a soldier's equipment. The grips on Ek's knives had eight scalloped groves:four on each of two grips. This gave the user such a good grip that John Ek found that a crossguard was not necessary to prevent the hand from sliding onto the blade. When questioned about this by the War Production Board, Ek greased his hand and plunged one of his knives into the wooden floor with such force that no one was able to pull it out.

The "Poured-Lead" Rivets which were used to affix the two wooden grips to the blade tang were unique to Ek Knives. Most knives at the time used standard cutlery rivets or pins, or they were simply driven onto the rat-tail tang. The Poured-Lead Rivets had the advantage that, if the grips ever became loose, they could be tightened in the field without any tools. All the owner needed to do was take a heavy object, such as a rock, and pound the lead rivets to tighten them. Another advantage of the Poured-Lead Rivets was the extra weight which made the knife balance far better than most, as it added weight to the hilt. This caused it to fall into the hand, rather than fall out of the hand.

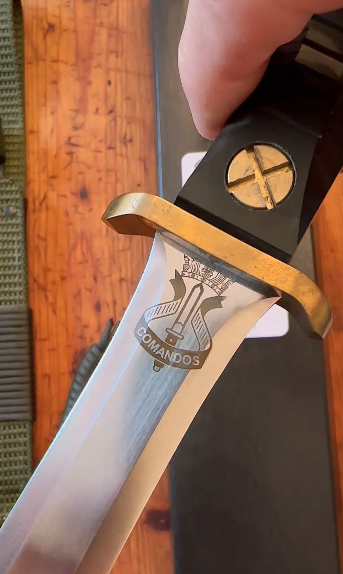
EK Knife with a Chilean Marines Special Operations Badge
