= Eveland Christian College =

Private college in Isabela, Philippines

- Established: 1947
- President: Rev. Melanio A. Castillo
- Location: Bonifacio St., Barangay IV, San Mateo, Isabela, 3318, Philippines; 16°53′6.75″N 121°35′.14″E
- Location in Luzon Location in the Philippines

Eveland Christian College is a private nonsectarian school in San Mateo, Isabela. It began as Eveland Memorial College in 1947, named after William Perry Eveland. It was renamed Eveland Junior College in the 1970s, and renamed again in 2000 to its current name. It offers primary, secondary, and tertiary education.
