= Mercedes-Benz EQS =

Battery electric full-size luxury liftback

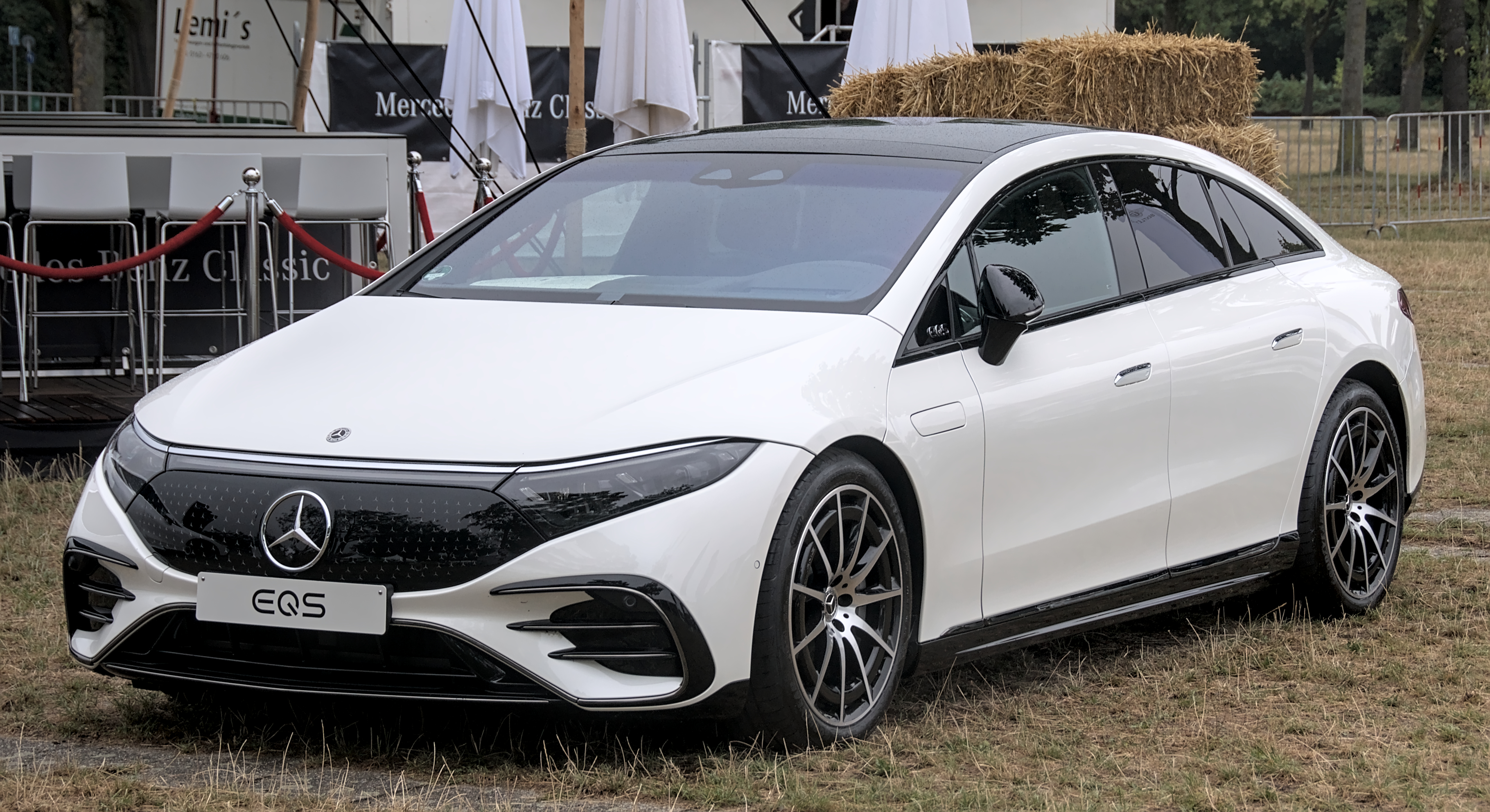

Overview
- Manufacturer: Mercedes-Benz Group
- Model code: V297
- Production: May 2021 – present
- Model years: 2022–present
- Assembly: Germany: Sindelfingen; India: Pune (MBI); Thailand: Samut Prakan (TAAP); Malaysia: Pekan (HICOM)
- Designer: Robert Lešnik, Lukas Haag, Mark Fetherston, Gabriel Nemeth, Balázs Filczer

Body and chassis
- Class: Full-size luxury car (F)
- Body style: 5-door liftback
- Layout: Rear-motor, rear-wheel-drive; Dual-motor, all-wheel-drive (4Matic)
- Platform: Mercedes-Benz EVA platform
- Related: Mercedes-Benz EQS SUV; Mercedes-Benz EQE; Mercedes-Benz EQE SUV

Powertrain
- Electric motor: Permanent magnet AC synchronous
- Power output: 215 kW (288 hp) (EQS 350); 245 kW (329 hp) (EQS 450+); 2 with total 265 kW (355 hp) (450 4MATIC); 2 with total 330 kW (440 hp) (500 4MATIC); 2 with total 385 kW (516 hp) (580 4MATIC); 2 with total 484–560 kW (649–751 hp) (EQS 53 AMG 4MATIC+)
- Transmission: Direct-drive automatic
- Battery: 108 kWh 400V NCM 811 lithium-ion
- Electric range: WLTP: 108.4 kWh 2wd: 785 km (488 mi); 107.8 kWh 4wd: 676 km (420 mi); 90 kWh 2wd: 640 km (398 mi)
- Plug-in charging: 22 kW 3-phase on board, 200 kW DC, bidirectional (Japan only), 350 kW DC

Dimensions
- Wheelbase: 3,210 mm (126.4 in)
- Length: 5,216–5,265 mm (205.4–207.3 in)
- Width: 1,926 mm (75.8 in)
- Height: 1,512–1,513 mm (59.5–59.6 in)
- Kerb weight: 2,480–2,655 kg (5,467–5,853 lb)

The Mercedes-Benz EQS (V297) is a battery electric full-size luxury liftback produced by German automobile manufacturer Mercedes-Benz Group. Part of the Mercedes-EQ family, it was released in September 2021 in Germany and the fourth quarter of 2021 in the United States.

== Presentation ==
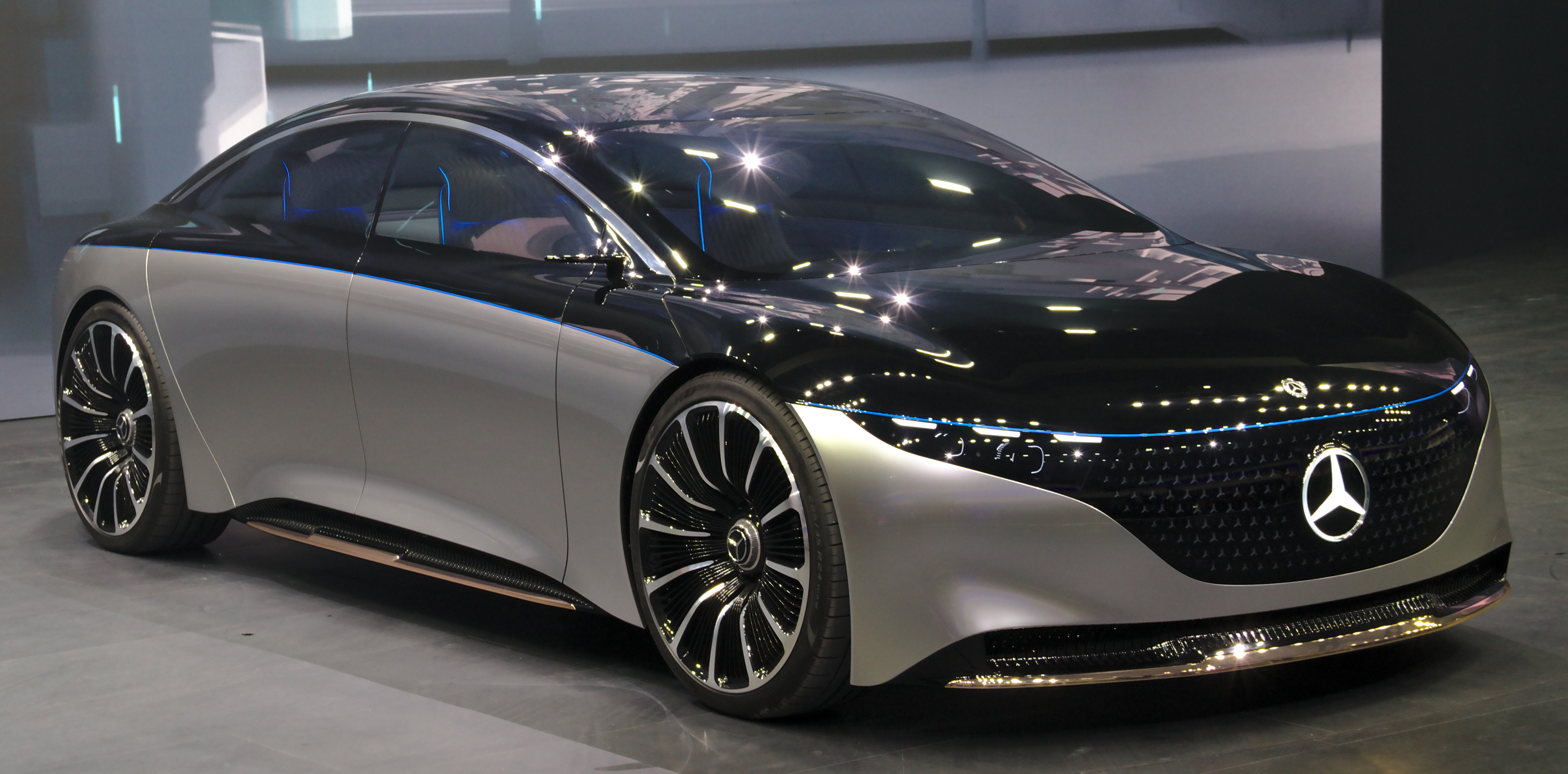
Mercedes-Benz Vision EQS concept at the 2019 IAA

The EQS was presented at the 2019 International Motor Show Germany (IAA) as the Mercedes-Benz Vision EQS and foreshadows the future Mercedes-Benz series luxury electric saloon cars announced for 2021. The production model debuted on 15 April 2021.

== Technical details ==
The EQS is the first EQ model that is based on the technical platform specific to the electric models, called the MEA. Its automobile drag coefficient is as low as 0.20, making it the car with lowest drag coefficient in production at the time of its introduction (not to be confused with total air drag, which consists of drag coefficient and frontal area).

The car is powered by a water-cooled permanent magnet synchronous motor from Valeo Siemens in the EQS 450+ model, and by two of these motors in the EQS 580 4MATIC model. The torque is sent from the motor(s) to the wheels through a single-speed reduction gearbox. In the single-motor EQS 450+ model, the motor has a rated power of 245 kW (329 hp), and a braking power of 186 kW (249 hp), allowing a deceleration of 5 m·s^{−2}. German motor journalist Alexander Bloch from Auto Motor und Sport found the energy consumption to be 150...160 W·h/km at 130 km/h (81 mph), and the average energy consumption to be 158 W·h/km. With the 107.8 kW·h secondary cell, the car has a range of more than 638 km. The average recharging power is 163 kW with a peak of >200 kW, allowing the car to reach a 79% state of charge in about half an hour.

The Mercedes-AMG EQS 53 4Matic+ was presented at the Munich Motor Show in September 2021 and is the first all-electric AMG car. It has two electric motors producing 560 kW (751 hp) of power and delivering 1,020 N⋅m (752 lbf⋅ft) of torque. Its handling characteristics as well as its cooling system have been upgraded to match the motors' higher power output.

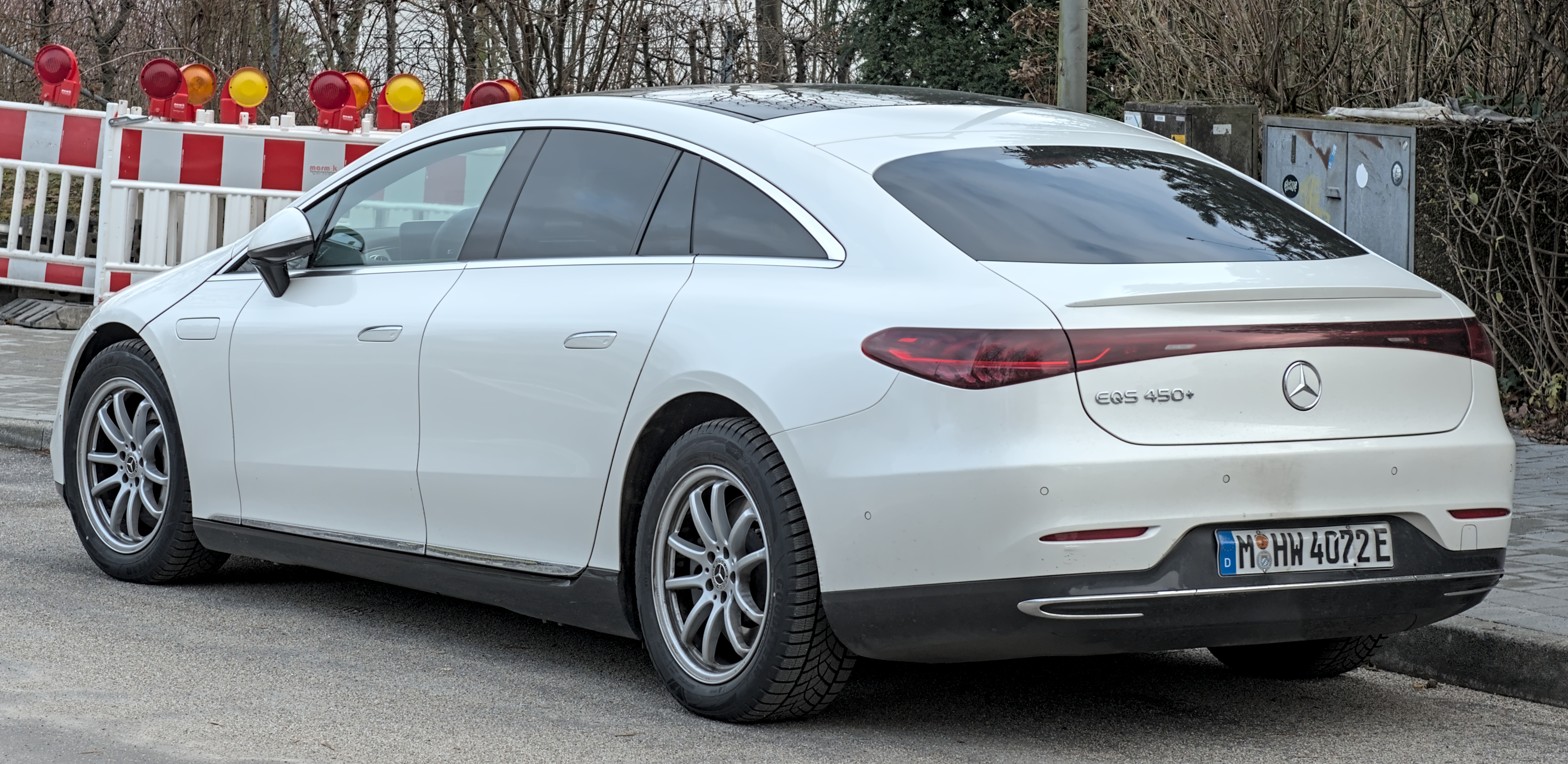
Rear view

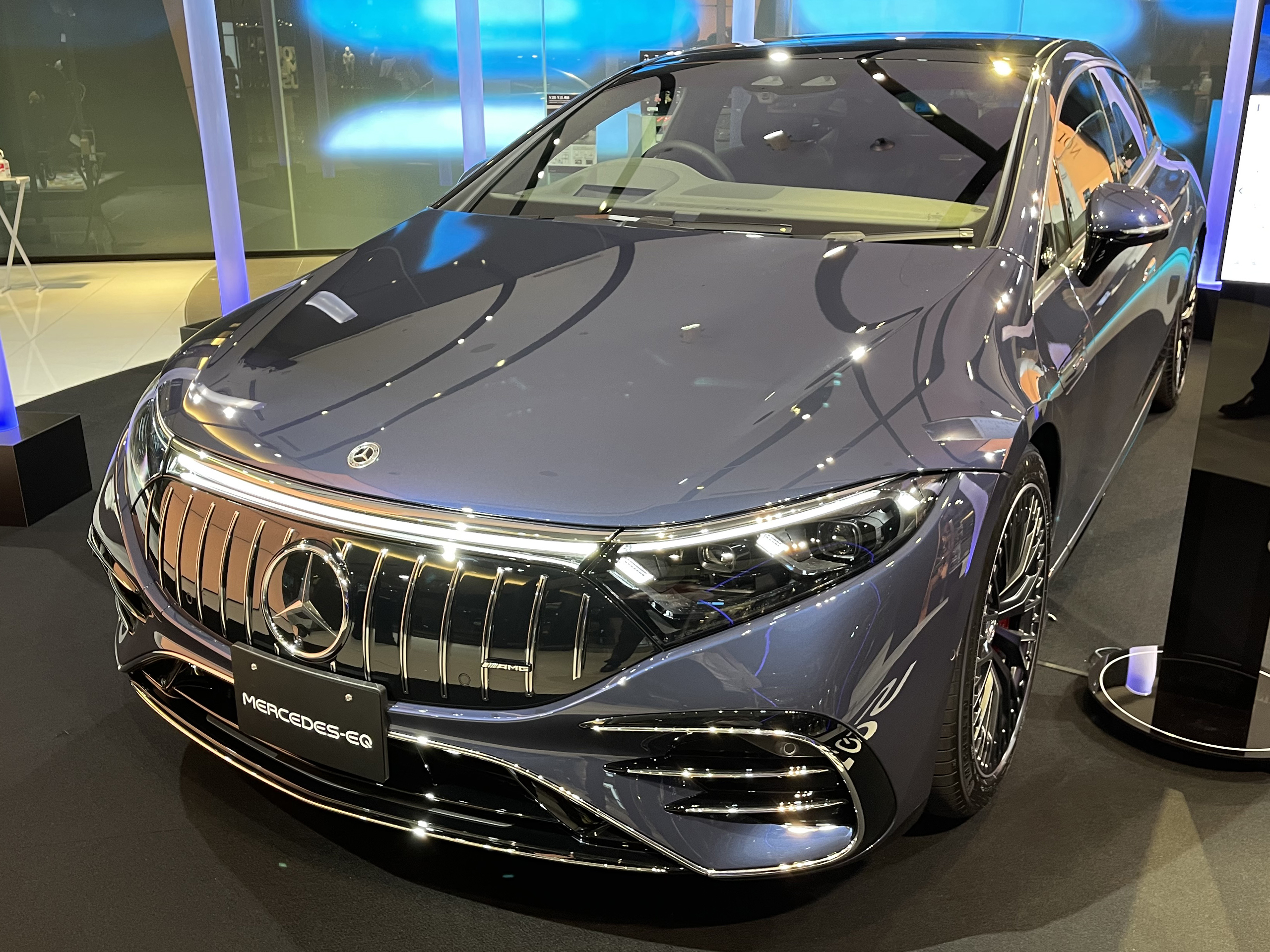
Mercedes-AMG EQS 53 4Matic+

== Equipment ==
As a luxury car, the EQS comes with rear-wheel steering, over-the-air updates, wireless phone charging, 360-degree camera system, keyless entry, and can optionally be equipped with seats with massage, head-up display with augmented reality, automatically opening and closing doors, integrated toll payment system, gesture controls, HEPA air filter, heat, noise, and infrared rays insulated glass and heated windshield. Starting in late 2026, the EQS began to be offered with steer-by-wire as an option.

=== MBUX Hyperscreen ===
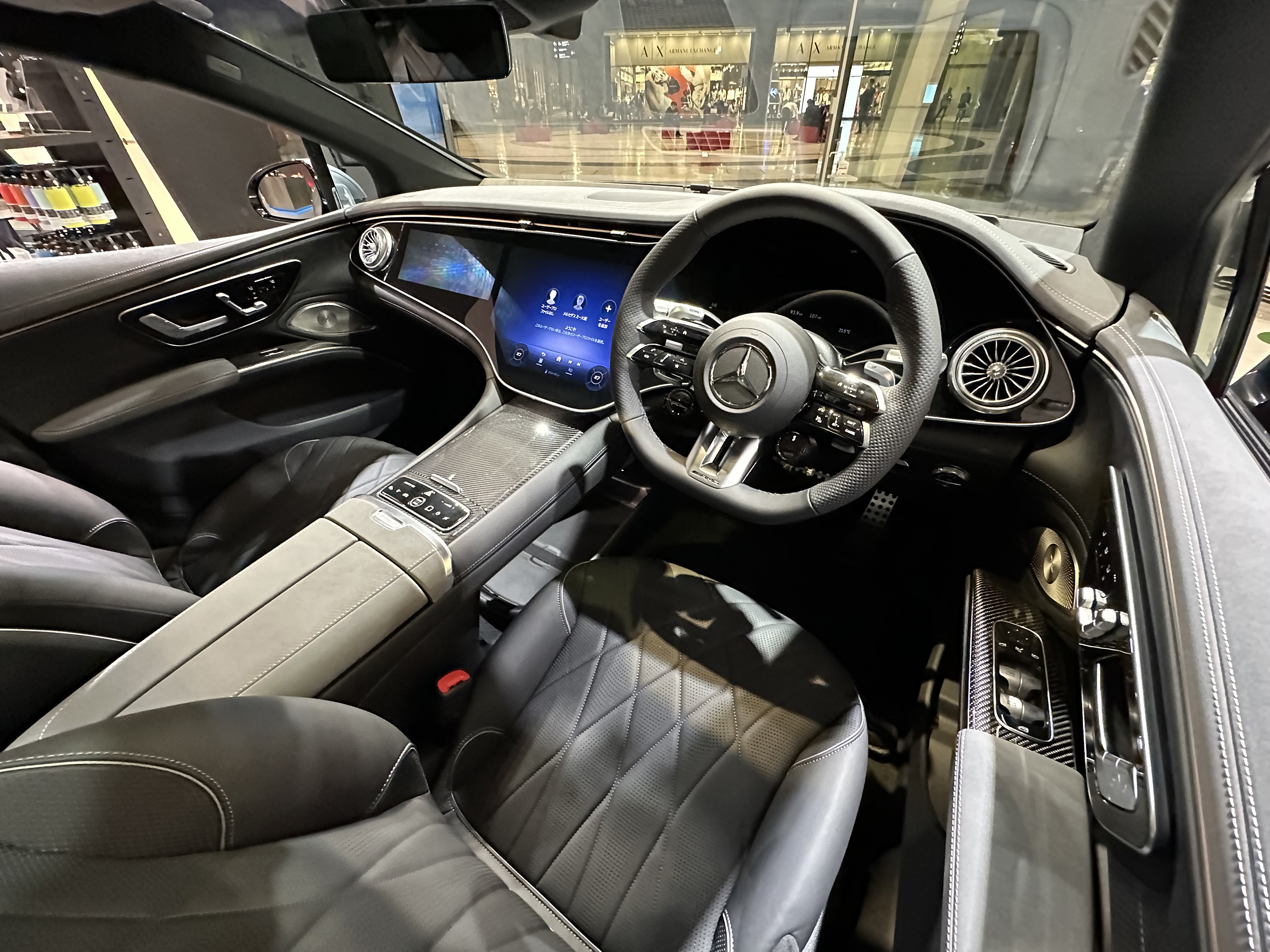
Interior

The high-end versions of the EQS feature two separate OLED screens and an LCD instrument cluster that cover nearly the full width of the dashboard. The whole infotainment system is powered by eight CPU cores and 24 gigabytes of RAM. The multi-purpose digital dashboard has been generally well received by consumers.

=== Safety and automated features ===
The car has several safety and automated features, including adaptive cruise control, lane centering, automatic lane changing, automated emergency braking, avoidance assist (for pedestrians and bicycles), blind spot monitoring including rear seat exit warning, cross-traffic alert, traffic-sign recognition, automatic parking assist, and adaptive headlights.

Up until January 2026, the car optionally included a level 3 autonomous driving feature named Drive Pilot, allowing the driver to take their hands off the wheel and their eyes off the road in heavy traffic up to a 60 km/h (37 mph) speed on 13,191 kilometres (8,197 mi) of German motorways. The system was a world first and works by using lidar cameras, microphones, and various sensors. It was planned to also become available in other countries. The car was the first that included a level 4 automated valet parking system named Intelligent Park Pilot. In January 2026, Mercedes removed the Level 3 feature from its cars in favor of an upcoming Level 2 capability.

Euro NCAP test results Mercedes-EQ EQS 450+ 4x2 AMG Line (LHD) (2021)
Test	Points	%
Overall:	5 /5 stars	
Adult occupant:	36.6	96%
Child occupant:	45	91%
Pedestrian:	41.3	76%
Safety assist:	12.9	80%

ANCAP test results Mercedes-Benz EQS 450 4MATIC only (2021, aligned with Euro NCAP)
Test	Points	%
Overall:	5 /5 stars	
Adult occupant:	36.61	96%
Child occupant:	46	93%
Pedestrian:	41.33	76%
Safety assist:	12.93	80%

== Models ==
The specifications include:

Model	Years	Power	Torque	Battery capacity full/usable [kWh]	Drivetrain	0–100 km/h (0–62 mph)	Top speed	Max. range (WLTP)	Range (EPA)
EQS 350	2022–	215 kW (292 PS; 288 hp)	565 N⋅m (417 lb⋅ft)	100/90.6	RWD	6.6 s	210 km/h (130 mph)	638 km (396 mi)	
EQS 450+	2021–	245 kW (333 PS; 329 hp)	568 N⋅m (419 lb⋅ft)	120/107.8	RWD	6.2 s	210 km/h (130 mph)	785 km (488 mi)	350 mi (563 km)
EQS 450; 4MATIC	2022–	265 kW (360 PS; 355 hp)	800 N⋅m (590 lb⋅ft)	120/107.8	4WD	5.6 s	210 km/h (130 mph)	685 km (426 mi)	
EQS 500; 4MATIC	2022–	330 kW (449 PS; 443 hp)	855 N⋅m (631 lb⋅ft)	120/107.8	4WD	4.8 s	210 km/h (130 mph)	685 km (426 mi)	
EQS 580; 4MATIC	2021–	385 kW (523 PS; 516 hp)	855 N⋅m (631 lb⋅ft)	120/107.8	4WD	4.3 s	210 km/h (130 mph)	676 km (420 mi)	340 mi (547 km)
AMG EQS 53; 4MATIC+	2022–	484–560 kW (658–761 PS; 649–751 hp)	949 N⋅m (700 lb⋅ft)	120/107.8	4WD	3.4–3.8 s	220 km/h (137 mph)	586 km (364 mi)	277 mi (446 km)

== 2024 facelift ==
Mercedes-Benz released the facelifted model of the EQS on 10 April 2024. Changes includes the addition of a free-standing hood ornament, an updated front fascia with a faux grille and horizontal chrome slats, the interior received minor changes with chrome accents on the B-pillar air vents and the rear seat pillows features contrast stitching and Nappa leather piping, and increased battery capacity for model variants.

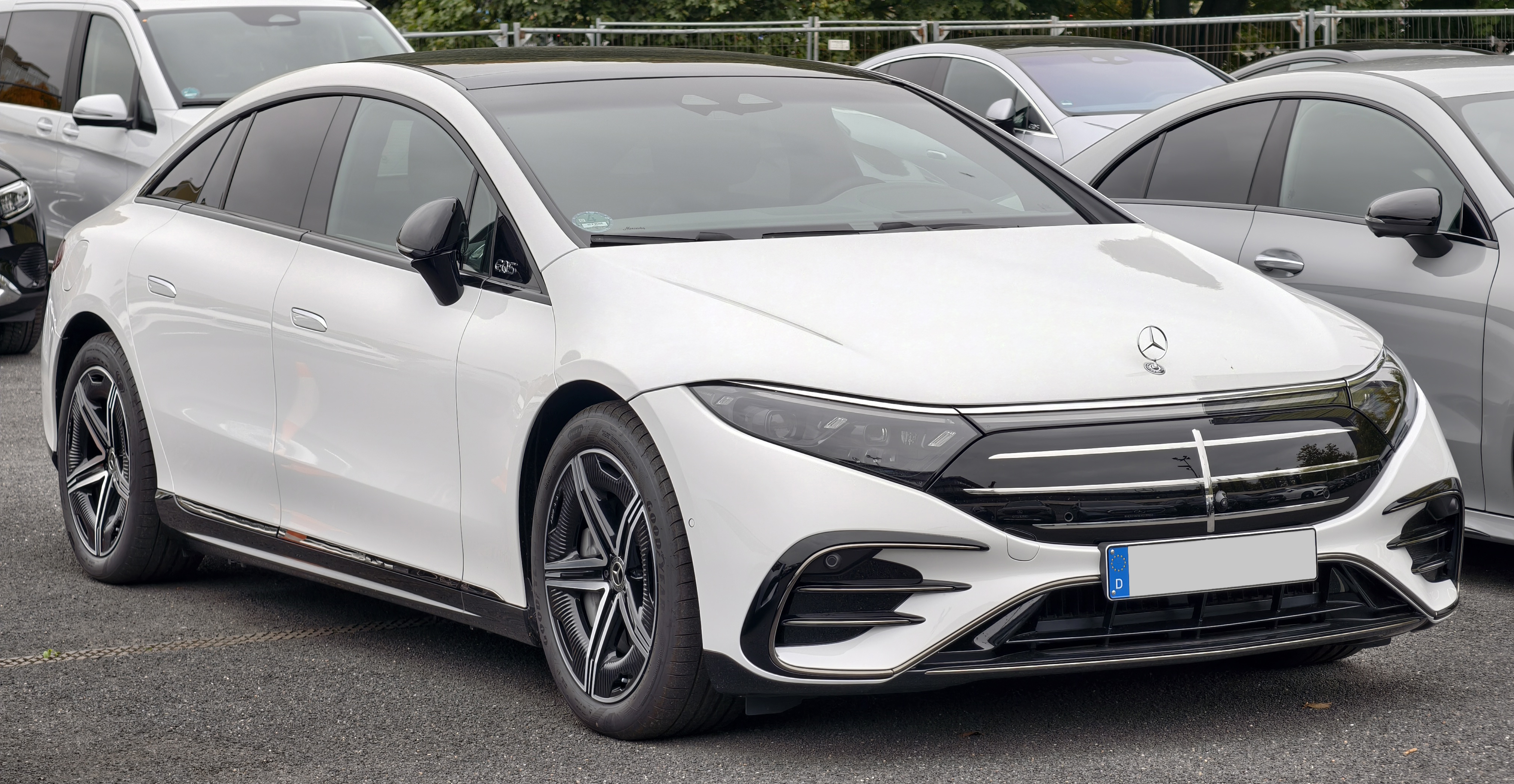
EQS 500 (facelift)

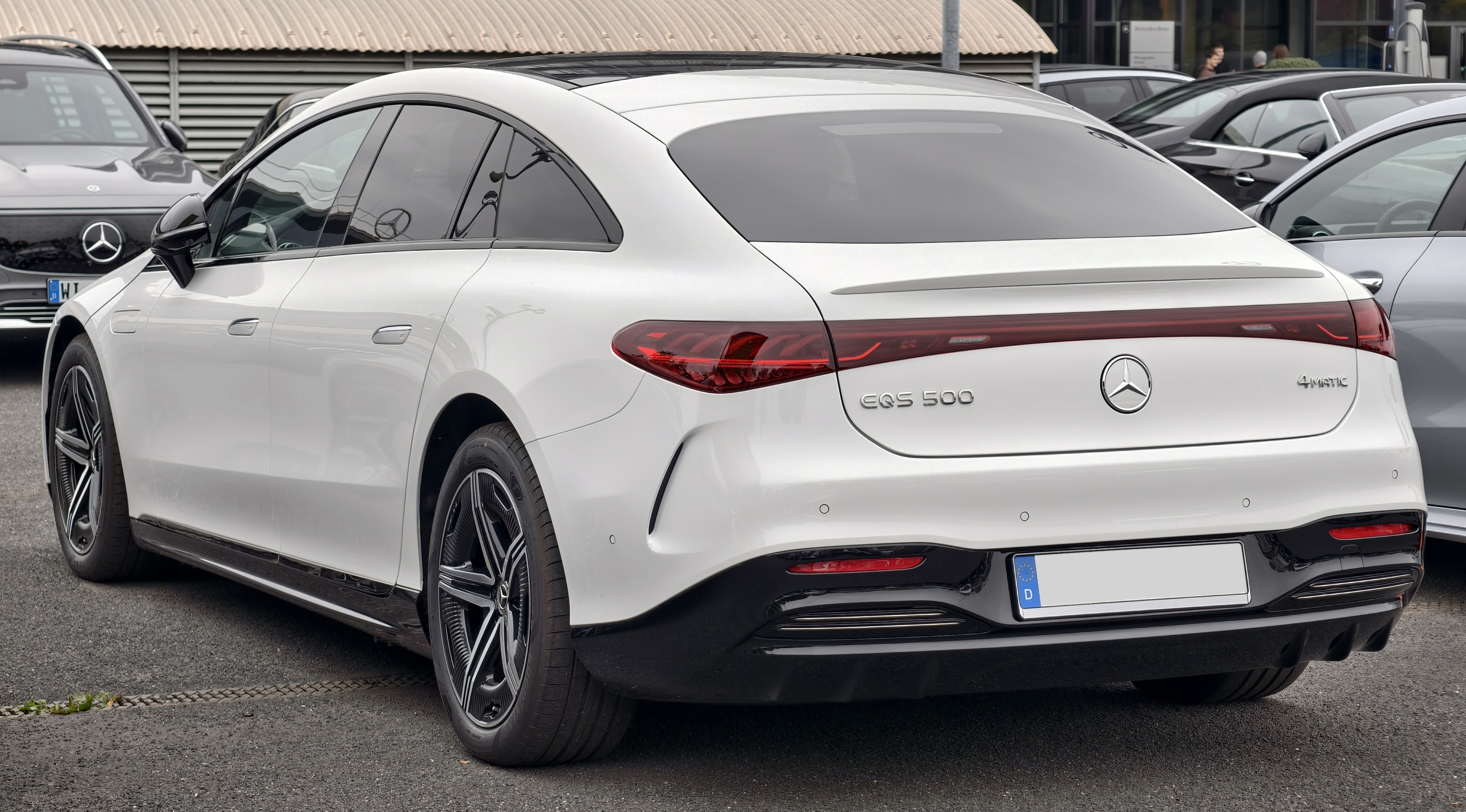
Rear view (facelift)

== 2026 facelift ==
The second facelift of the EQS was officially unveiled on 14 April 2026.

The EQS received multiple aesthetic changes. The front fascia was revised, including 3-pointed stars in the new illuminated grille and reshaped headlights. The taillights were also updated with the spiral-like LED element extending towards the centre.

The interior features heated seatbelts first seen on the updated W223 S-Class and an optional yoke-based steering wheel for versions equipped with steer-by-wire.

The updated range, including the EQS 400, EQS 450+, EQS 500 4MATIC and EQS 580 4MATIC, are upgraded to an 800-volt architecture and offered with either 112 or 122 kWh battery packs. All models are able to achieve a maximum charing speed of 350 kW, increasing up to 198 miles of range in 10 minutes. The EQS 450+ has the highest WLTP-rated range, with up to 926 km (575 mi) and a claimed energy consumption of between 15.4 kWh/100 km and 19.3 kWh/100 km.

EQS (2026 facelift)

Rear view (2026 facelift)

== Reviews and reception ==
In December 2022, Bloomberg News listed the EQS as a "terrific" (great) alternative option to the Tesla Model S for auto owners angered by Elon Musk.

== Sales ==
Year	China	
Year	EQS	AMG
2023	1,983	302
2024	839	72
2025	235	100
