= EQ =

EQ or eQ may refer to:

== Arts, entertainment, and media ==
- Evangelical Quarterly, religious journal
- EverQuest, a fantasy-themed role-playing game first released in 1999

== Businesses ==
- eQ Bank, a Finnish bank
- EQ Bank, a direct banking brand of Canadian lender Equitable Bank
- Equiniti, a British outsourcing business focused on financial and administration services.
- Embarq (NYSE stock symbol EQ), a local exchange carrier in the United States

== Science and technology ==
=== Chemistry ===
- Electrochemical equivalent
- Equivalent, unit of amount of substance
- Boldenone undecylenate (Equpoise), an anabolic–androgenic steroid

=== Computer science ===
- Equality (relational operator), used in computer programming for an equality operator

=== Music technology ===
- Equalization (audio), in audio processing

=== Earth science ===
- Earthquake
- Equator, in geography

=== Mathematics ===
- Equation, in mathematics
- Equivalent (chemistry), a measurement unit used in chemistry

=== Neuroscience ===
- Encephalization quotient, a value for the brain to body mass ratio
- Emotional quotient, a capacity to recognize and use emotional information
- Empathy quotient, a psychological self-report measure of empathy

== Transportation ==
=== Stations ===
- Elizabeth Quay (EQ) station, terminus of the Yanchep and Mandurah railway lines in Perth, Australia

=== Automobiles ===
- Chery eQ, a 2014–present Chinese electric city car
- Mercedes-EQ, a family of German electric vehicles
- TAME, an airline based in Quito, Ecuador, IATA airline designator EQ

== Other ==
=== Education ===
- Education Queensland, part of the Department of Education (Queensland)

=== Religion and mysticism ===
- English Qaballa, a system of numerology

=== Sport ===
- Equestrianism, a term pertaining to horses or their riders

== See also ==
- EQS (disambiguation)
- E (disambiguation)
- Q (disambiguation)
- QE (disambiguation)
- Equals (disambiguation)
