= Blade Show =

Cutlery industry trade show

- Status: Active
- Genre: knives
- Venue: Cobb Galleria Centre (As of 1995)
- Locations: Atlanta, Georgia (As of 1995)
- Country: United States
- Inaugurated: 1982
- Organizer: BLADE (magazine)
- Filing status: 501(c)(3)
- Website: www.bladeshow.com

The Blade Show is an annual tradeshow for the cutlery industry. It is the largest event of its type in the world. The show is owned by Caribou Media Group and is hosted by Blade Magazine. The event has over 1,000 exhibitors and is the host for inductees into the annual Cutlery Hall of Fame. It also hosts the annual Blade HQ Balisong Competition, BladeSports International Cutting World Championships, Blade University, Knife of the Year Awards, and a variety of knifemaking classes and demos. The event takes place every year over the course of several days and brings in knifemakers and knife companies from all parts of world.

== History ==
The first Blade Show was held in 1982 as the American Blade Convention and Show in Cincinnati, Ohio. The magazine who hosted the show was known as 'American Blade' at the time. In 1983 it became known as "The American Blade Collector's Show". In 1984 the name became "The Blade Super Show". In 1986 the show relocated to Knoxville, Tennessee. In 1988, the name was changed to the Blade Show & Cutlery Fair and it became loosely referred to as the Blade Show. In 1993 the show moved to Atlanta, Georgia and officially became known as Blade Show hosted by BLADE Magazine. In 2018, the show went under the ownership of Caribou Media Group.

== Cutlery Hall of Fame ==
Every year, the Blade Show admits a new person into the "Cutlery Hall of Fame". The Cutlery Hall of Fame is composed of knifemakers, authors and persons who promote knife making, Bladesmithing, and Knife collecting. Each year, the living members of the Cutlery Hall Of Fame nominate and vote on the latest inductee to join their ranks.

- Henry D. Baer - Knifemaker, President of Schrade Knives and namesake of the "Uncle Henry" brand of pocketknives.
- Dewey Ferguson - Author
- Bo Randall - Knifemaker
- James B. Lile - Knifemaker
- M.H. Cole - Knifemaker and Author
- Al Buck - Founder of Buck Knives
- William R. Williamson - Scholar and collector of Bowie knives
- Pete Gerber - Founder of Gerber Legendary Blades
- Bob Loveless - Knifemaker
- William F. Moran - Bladesmith
- Jim Parker - Knifemaker
- George Herron - Knifemaker 1932-2007
- Frank Buster - Knifemaker
- Frank Forsyth
- A.G. Russell - Knifemaker
- Ken Warner - Author
- Jim Bowie - Father of the Bowie knife
- Maury Shavin
- Hubert Lawell
- William Scagel - Knifemaker
- Gil Hibben - Knifemaker
- Harry McEvoy - Author
- Buster Warenski - Knifemaker
- Albert M. Baer - Founder of Schrade Knives
- Col. Rex Applegate - Knife designer, author
- B.R. Hughes - Author
- Bruce Voyles - Author
- Bernard Levine - Author
- Houston Price - Author
- Bill Adams - Author
- Jim Weyer - Author and photographer
- Chuck Buck - Knifemaker - Buck Knives
- Blackie Collins - Knifemaker
- Frank Centofante - Knifemaker
- Ron Lake - Knifemaker
- Sal Glesser - Designer, Founder of Spyderco
- Joe Drouin - Knife Collector
- Bob Schrimsher - Knifemaking Supply
- Rudy Ruana - Knifemaker
- D¹Alton Holder - Knifemaker
- Michael Walker - Knifemaker, Inventor of the Walker linerlock
- George "Butch" Winter - Author
- Tim Leatherman - Inventor of the multi-tool knife and founder of Leatherman Tools
- Dan Dennehy - Knifemaker, Founding Member of the Knifemakers' Guild
- Ken Onion - Knifemaker and inventor of the SpeedSafe Mechanism
- Al Mar - Knifemaker, founder of Al Mar Knives
- Paul Bos - Master heat treater - Buck Knives
- Carl Elsener III (2011) - Knifemaker - Victorinox
- Kit Carson (2012) - Knifemaker
- Wayne Goddard (2013) - Knifemaker and Author
- Goldie Russell (2014) - Knifemaker
- Chris Reeve (2015) - Knifemaker and inventor of the Integral Lock
- CJ Buck (2016) - Knifemaker - Buck Knives
- Jim Batson (2017) - Knifemaker - Benchmade Knife
- Les de Asis (2017) - CEO - Benchmade Knife
- Phil Lobred (2018) - Knife Collector
- Dan Delavan (2018) - Knife Retailer - Founder California Custom Knife Show
- Tony Bose (2019) - Knifemaker
- Mel Pardue (2019) - Knifemaker
- Steve Shackleford (2019) - Editor-in-Chief - Blade Magazine
- Joe Keeslar (2020) - Knifemaker
- Jim Sornberger (2020) - Knifemaker
- Jay Hendrickson (2021) - Knifemaker
- Beverly and Billy-Mace Imel (2021) - Knifemakers

== See also ==
SHOT Show
