= W. R. Case & Sons Cutlery Co. =

American manufacturer of knives

W.R. Case & Sons Cutlery Company
- Type: Subsidiary
- Industry: Cutlery
- Founded: 1889; 137 years ago
- Headquarters: Bradford, Pennsylvania,
- Products: Pocket knives Kitchen knives
- Number of employees: over 350
- Parent: Zippo
- Website: www.wrcase.com

W.R. Case & Sons Cutlery Company is an American manufacturer of traditional pocket knives, fixed blades/sporting knives, kitchen knives, limited edition commemoratives and collectibles. The company originated in Little Valley, New York, around the turn of the 20th century, before relocating to its current home, Bradford, Pennsylvania, in 1905. The company's namesake, William Russell Case, first made knives with his brothers under the name Case Brothers Cutlery Company. His son, John Russell ("Russ") Case, worked as a salesman for his father's company before founding W.R. Case & Sons.

== History ==
The company's roots extend back to 1889, when the Case brothers – William Russell (W.R.), Jean, John and Andrew Case, formerly of the Cattaraugus Cutlery Company – began selling cutlery from the back of a wagon in various small western New York villages. In January 1900, the brothers incorporated to form Case Brothers Cutlery Company.

John Russell Case, who named the company after his father, William Russell ("W.R."), formed W.R. Case & Sons as it is known today. By the time the company moved to Pennsylvania in 1905, the four Case brothers had established their brands. The company's original factory in Little Valley, New York, burned down in 1912. This resulted in the factory moving to Springville, NY.

Beginning with World War I, Case has made military knives for U.S. servicemen including the M3 Fighting Knife and the V-42 stiletto (the latter, for the Devil's Brigade). During the 1965 flight of the Molly Brown, astronauts Gus Grissom and John Young used special Case knives on a NASA space mission.

The company, alongside Alcoa, founded the Cutco brand of cutlery in 1949 under the company name Alcas (its name being an amalgamation of Alcoa and Case); Alcoa would purchase Case's stake in the company in 1972, and Alcas' management bought the company from Alcoa in 1982, and is now simply known as the Cutco Corporation.

The Case Company is currently owned by Zippo Manufacturing Company, another business based in Bradford.

Case knives are made with blades usually stamped from domestic chromium-vanadium steel alloy or stainless steel, and hardened using proprietary heat treatment methods. Knife handles or scales are made of a variety of materials, from the more common synthetic materials to natural materials like Brazilian cattle bone, India stag, buffalo horn, ancient mammoth ivory, mother of pearl, exotic hardwoods and precious stones on the more expensive collector's knives. Brass and nickel silver metals are used to make the knives' other component parts.

Many people collect Case knives as a hobby. This practice arose from the unique tang stamp dating systems employed by the company beginning in the late 19th century. Today's Case Collectors Club is made up of 18,000 members.

== Case knife patterns ==
The list of Case knife patterns has remained fairly consistent throughout its history, although a number of new Case designs have been patented in recent years. Some of these include: The SlimLock, Trapper, Tiny Trapper, Baby Doc, Tribal-Lock, CopperLock, RussLock, Baby Butterbean, Cheetah, Cheetah Cub, Hobo, Sod Buster, Mako, Mini-Blackhorn and XX-Changer.

The Hobo

When the Hobo (54HB) is closed, it resembles a regular Trapper. The handle splits apart revealing a separate knife, fork, spoon and bottle opener. Case produced two variations of the Hobo ('51 and '52) from the early 1900s-1940. These were made with two to four utensil implements using a can opener, soup spoon, three-pronged fork, and knife blade. Case re-introduced the Hobo (54) in 1983.

The CopperLock

In 1997, Case introduced the CopperLock. Designed by Tom Hart, the CopperLock (549L) combined elements from older Case knife patterns to make an entirely new knife with a fully locking blade. Case celebrated the 10th Anniversary of the CopperLock in 2007. This pattern was retired to the Case XX Vault in July 2008.

The SlimLock

The SlimLock was originally produced in 2005 as a tribute to John Russell Case. Each knife carries a "JRC" (John Russell Case) tang stamp and a liner that locks. The first featured BG-42 steel blades. A second family was released in 2006 that featured ladder patterned Damascus blades.

The Cheetah

The Cheetah is a single-bladed knife that has a swing guard. Throughout its existence, it has been manufactured with or without a swing guard, and with and without a locking mechanism. Some of the more recent knives are stamped with an "L" after the pattern number, which signifies that the blade locks when opened.

The RussLock

The RussLock (953L) debuted in 2000. This pattern features a liner lock and a gimped lever for convenient one-hand opening. The RussLock was inspired by the Jack Knife (028), a pattern that has been retired for over 40 years. It was designed by the late Case master knifemaker Tommy Hart, who named it after William Russell (Russ) Case. The pattern number (1953) represents the year Russ Case died.

== Case licensed knives ==
Case has regularly manufactured knives under licenses with American icons like Elvis Presley Enterprises, Ford Motor Company, Coca-Cola Company, Boy Scouts of America, Ducks Unlimited, John Deere, Sturm, Ruger & Co., National Wild Turkey Federation, John Wayne, Dale Earnhardt Jr., Johnny Cash and Brooks & Dunn. Case has also partnered with custom knifemaker Tony Bose to produce new designs.

== Steel types ==
Chrome vanadium (CV)

Chrome vanadium is a special formula of alloyed cutlery steel known for its ease of re-sharpening. (CV blades require extra care. A thin film of oil should be kept on the blade to maintain the polished finish of the steel.)

Case Tru-Sharp Surgical Stainless Steel (SS)

Case Tru-Sharp Surgical Stainless Steel is a stainless steel. It offers excellent blade strength and corrosion resistance.

Damascus (DAM)

Damascus steels date back to the Crusades, and are named for the famous Syrian city where some of the first man-made metals were traded publicly. It consists of many thin layers of metal that are forged together to form a laminated solid. Designs take shape as layers are folded in then welded together by forging; while creating an intricate design and strong blade.

BG42 (BG42)

BG42 is a domestic alloy steel. It is an aeronautics bearing-grade composition with added carbon and vanadium.

154CM

154-CM is an American-made stainless alloy. It combines three principal elements: carbon, chromium, and molybdenum. Added levels of carbon and chromium are also used. Re-sharpening can require extra effort, but is needed less often.

== Awards ==
W.R. Case & Sons has been the recipient of awards in the cutlery industry over the years. In 2004 Case was awarded the Industry Achievement Award at the Blade Show held in Atlanta, GA; the Case Family Brands Encyclopedia Set was awarded the Blade Investor Collector Knife of the Year at the same show. The Case SlimLock won an Editor's Choice Award from Popular Mechanics. In 2008 Case won "Collaboration Knife of the Year" at the Blade Show in Atlanta, GA with a Tony Bose designed piece named the "Arkansas Hunter".

Case has also won awards for advertising and marketing, for instance its packaging designs won in two categories at the North American Packaging Competition for Excellence: Best Family Packages and General Superiority According to End-Use Household. The Case website won an ADDY award for creative excellence in 2006. A Case packaging design won the Best of the Show Award at the North American Packaging Competition for Excellence in the Collector's Item category.

== Case Collectors Club ==
In 1972, Dewey Ferguson, a Case knife collector and author, wrote to Case President Bob Farquharson about forming a knife collectors association for the W. R. Case & Sons Cutlery Company. The Case Collectors Club (CCC) was established in 1981. A newsletter was introduced in March of that year to formalize communications between Case and its club members. The first edition of the newsletter was in black and white and had eight pages. During the same year, the first Case Collectors Club Annual Club Knife, an Appaloosa Bone Large Trapper (A6151 SSP), was made available to club members. The club began with 426 charter members in 1981. As of 2016, there were 11,000 members. Ferguson was listed on Case's "Wall of Fame" in 2001.
