= Bob Loveless =

American knife maker (1929–2010)

Robert Waldorf Loveless
- Born: January 2, 1929; Warren, Ohio, U.S.
- Died: 2 September 2010 (aged 81); Riverside, California, U.S.
- Education: Kent State University
- Occupation: Knifemaker
- Awards: Blade Cutlery Hall of Fame

Robert Waldorf Loveless (January 2, 1929 – September 2, 2010), also known as Bob Loveless or RW Loveless, was an American knife maker who designed and popularized the hollowground drop point blade and the use of full tapered tangs and screw-type handle scale fasteners within the art of knifemaking. He is cited by other knifemakers and collectors as one of the most innovative custom knife makers in the world.

== Early life ==
Loveless was born on January 2, 1929, in Warren, Ohio. At age 14, he altered his birth certificate and joined the Merchant Marine and later served as an Air Corps control tower operator on Iwo Jima. He witnessed a number of knife fights in the bars of foreign ports, which he attributed to giving him an interest in knives.

In 1950, Loveless attended Chicago's Armour Institute of Technology (later renamed Illinois Institute of Technology - IIT) and took a course taught by the architect Ludwig Mies van der Rohe. In 1951, he returned to Ohio and studied literature and sociology at Kent State University.

== Knifemaking ==
In December 1953, Loveless returned to the Merchant Marine on a tanker based in New York. Loveless visited Abercrombie & Fitch in New York City in order to purchase a Randall Made knife. After learning there was a nine-month wait for the knife he wanted, he decided to make his own. He ground his first blade from a 1937 Packard Automobile spring found in a Newark, New Jersey junkyard and forged it on the oil-fired galley stove of the ship on which he was serving. After showing this homemade knife to the head of the Abercrombie & Fitch cutlery department he formed a relationship with the retailer to sell his knives. Loveless sold his knives to Abercrombie & Fitch for $14 USD a piece at the time.

From 1954 to 1960, Loveless made knives called "Delaware Maids" and they became Abercrombie & Fitch's best-selling handmade items, outselling the Randall blades. Loveless admitted that these knives were copies of Randall's designs, but by 1960 he began making his own innovations which set them apart. Loveless was a founding member of the Knifemakers' Guild in 1970 and served as the club's first Secretary. Loveless went on to serve two terms as the Guild's president from 1973 to 1976.

Through his study of 19th-century techniques, Loveless developed the fully-tapered-tang method of knife construction. This technique was formerly used to offset the weaknesses of steel in use prior to modern metallurgy. In Loveless' knives the entire piece of steel used to make the knife ran to the end of the butt as opposed to being cut to half the length of the handle and either pinned or glued in place. Loveless tapered the butt-end of the tang down to 1/16" the same way he tapered the point on the blade, placing the balance of the knife's weight in the center. The handles were secured via screw-type fasteners, making for a stronger knife overall.

Loveless introduced ATS-34 stainless steel to the knife making world in 1972 and pioneered the use of Micarta as a handle material. Loveless always considered himself a "Bench Maker" as opposed to a "Custom Maker" in that he only made knives from patterns that he designed instead of ideas that came from his customers. The only input Loveless would receive from a customer would be regarding the type of handle material used in the knife's construction.

He marked his blades by electro acid-etching his Football logo on the blade "R.W. LOVELESS, MAKER, RIVERSIDE, CALIFORNIA"; the Reclining Nude logo was also used on many of his knives. Most of his contemporaries stamped their logo on their knives using a power hammer or other device. Loveless believed this stamping could compromise the strength of the knife by causing stress fractures in the steel.

The primary style of knife made by Loveless was the Dropped Point hunting knife and he is considered to be the first maker to produce what is known as a tactical knife. However, Loveless refused to sell a customer one of his fighting knives unless the buyer could provide either police or military identification and could require a knife as a weapon. Loveless also made knives for use by US Army Special Forces and the CIA. One such knife was the size and shape of a pocket comb and fit inside a passport case. When the case was thrown, the blade cut through the case and sliced into whatever it hit.

Loveless designed the Gerber Guardian knife model for Gerber Knives and for a time was Gerber's Lead designer. Loveless went on to design knives for other factories such as Lone Wolf Knives, Beretta, Schrade Cutlery and others. Cold Steel makes a reproduction of his "Big Bear Classic" fighting knife. Loveless had been a participating maker from 1993 through 2006 in the Art Knife Invitational Show which is a closed association of the 25 most collectible knifemakers.

In addition to making knives, Loveless authored several books on making knives such as the 1977 How to Make Knives with coauthor Richard Barney.

For his many influences in custom knife design and promoting the art of handmade knives, Loveless was inducted into the Blade magazine Cutlery Hall of Fame at the 1985 Blade Show in Knoxville, Tennessee.

Loveless died September 2, 2010, aged 81, of lung cancer at his longtime home in Riverside, California.

In tribute to Bob's works throughout the years he was alive the Loveless collection created a rare tribute knife called the "Pioneers of Loveless." With a worth of $3500 only 25 of these knives were created in 2014 and is now owned by folks who have appreciation and solitude for the works of Bob Loveless.

== Quotes ==
- "Our lives are mired in detritus. Objects own us; they keep us from our creativity."
- "Why would anyone pay $3,000 for a hunting knife? They say, because my name is on it. I'm carrying an awfully big rep. If I were a gunfighter, I'd be hiding in a cave somewhere. But I wouldn't spend that much money for a knife if it were autographed by Jesus Christ himself!"
- "What's the point of a new knife in a museum or a cabinet? That's for history to decide, not the knifemaker."
- "When a man picks up a knife, there's an old memory from the collective unconscious that surfaces. A knife is an atavistic experience. It was man's first tool and weapon. Man was chipping flint into cutting edges before he invented the wheel. No matter how sophisticated we become, a knife takes us back to the cave."
