= Case knife =

Case knife can refer to:

- A large type of table knife, typically stored in a case
- Sheath knife
- The Dutch case-knife, a variety of runner bean
- W. R. Case & Sons Cutlery Co., a maker of knives
