= Blade (magazine) =

Consumer magazine about knife collecting

- Editor: Steve Shackleford
- Categories: Knives, knife collecting
- Frequency: Monthly
- Circulation: 40,000
- Publisher: Gun Digest Media LLC
- Founded: 1973
- Country: USA
- Based in: Appleton, Wisconsin
- Language: English
- Website: https://blademag.com/
- ISSN: 0744-6179

Blade is a consumer magazine about knife collecting. The magazine is based in Appleton, Wisconsin.

== History and profile ==
First published in 1973 under the title American Blade by Southern House Publishing Co. with Blackie Collins as the editor. The headquarters was in Chattanooga, Tennessee. The magazine's title was changed to Blade in 1982 after its purchase by Jim Parker and Bruce Voyles. In the 1980s, the magazine served as the launching point for an annual convention for knife collectors, the Blade Show; established a Cutlery Hall of Fame; and spun off a trade magazine, Blade Trade. In 1994, Voyles, then the sole owner, sold the publication and its properties to Krause Publications, which increased its frequency to monthly. F+W Publications Inc. purchased Krause Publications and Blade in 2002 and published it under its brand beginning in October 2004. In 2018, Gun Digest Media LLC acquired Blade, Blade Show and all related properties.

Coverage in the magazine ranges across the knife hobby, including military knives, kitchen cutlery, and manufacturing and legislation issues. The magazine publishes several identification columns and values for collectible knives.

Blade sponsors two annual knife shows every year. The Blade Show, held in Atlanta, Georgia every Spring and the Usual Suspect Gathering held in Las Vegas, Nevada in September.

== Cutlery Hall of Fame ==
Every year, Blade enters a new person into the "Cutlery Hall of Fame". The Cutlery Hall of Fame is composed of knifemakers, authors and persons who promote knife making, Bladesmithing, and Knife collecting. Each year, the living members of the Cutlery Hall Of Fame nominate and vote on the latest inductee to join their ranks.

- Henry D. Baer - Knifemaker, President of Schrade Knives and namesake of the "Uncle Henry" brand of pocketknives.
- Dewey Ferguson - Author
- Bo Randall - Knifemaker
- James B. Lile - Knifemaker
- M.H. Cole - Knifemaker and Author
- Al Buck - Founder of Buck Knives
- William R. Williamson - Scholar and collector of Bowie knives
- Pete Gerber - Founder of Gerber Legendary Blades
- Bob Loveless - Knifemaker
- William F. Moran - Bladesmith
- Jim Parker - Knifemaker
- George Herron - Knifemaker 1932-2007
- Frank Buster - Knifemaker
- Frank Forsyth
- A.G. Russell - Knifemaker
- Ken Warner - Author
- Jim Bowie - Father of the Bowie knife
- Maury Shavin
- Hubert Lawell
- William Scagel - Knifemaker
- Gil Hibben - Knifemaker
- Harry McEvoy - Author
- Buster Warenski - Knifemaker
- Albert M. Baer - Founder of Schrade Knives
- Col. Rex Applegate - Knife designer, author
- B.R. Hughes - Author
- Bruce Voyles - Author
- Bernard Levine - Author
- Houston Price - Author
- Bill Adams - Author
- Jim Weyer - Author and photographer
- Chuck Buck - Knifemaker - Buck Knives
- Blackie Collins - Knifemaker
- Frank Centofante - Knifemaker
- Ron Lake - Knifemaker
- Sal Glesser - Designer, Founder of Spyderco
- Joe Drouin - Knife Collector
- Bob Schrimsher - Knifemaking Supply
- Rudy Ruana - Knifemaker
- D¹Alton Holder - Knifemaker
- Michael Walker - Knifemaker, Inventor of the Walker linerlock
- George "Butch" Winter - Author
- Tim Leatherman - Inventor of the multi-tool knife and founder of Leatherman Tools
- Dan Dennehy - Knifemaker, Founding Member of the Knifemakers' Guild
- Ken Onion - Knifemaker and inventor of the SpeedSafe Mechanism
- Al Mar - Knifemaker, founder of Al Mar Knives
- Paul Bos - Master heat treater - Buck Knives
- Kit Carson - Knifemaker
- Wayne Goddard - Knifemaker
- Chris Reeve - Knifemaker
