= William Scagel =

American knifemaker (1873–1963)

William Wales Scagel
- Born: February 12, 1873; Alpena, Michigan
- Died: March 26, 1963 (aged 90)
- Occupations: Knifemaker, Bladesmith
- Awards: Blade Cutlery Hall of Fame

William Wales Scagel (February 12, 1873 – March 26, 1963) was an American knifemaker whose style had a profound impact on the cutlery trade, influencing it for over 100 years.

== Early life ==
Born near Alpena, Michigan and raised in Canada, Scagel began making knives in 1910 while working at lumber camps throughout Michigan and Canada. Prior to this he worked as a bridgebuilder and an artist in wrought iron. In 1920, after his shop in Muskegon, Michigan burned down he settled in nearby Fruitport and built a new shop on a piece of land he named "Dogwood Nub" which began his long full-time career of making knives, axes, cookware, and boats.

== Knifemaking ==
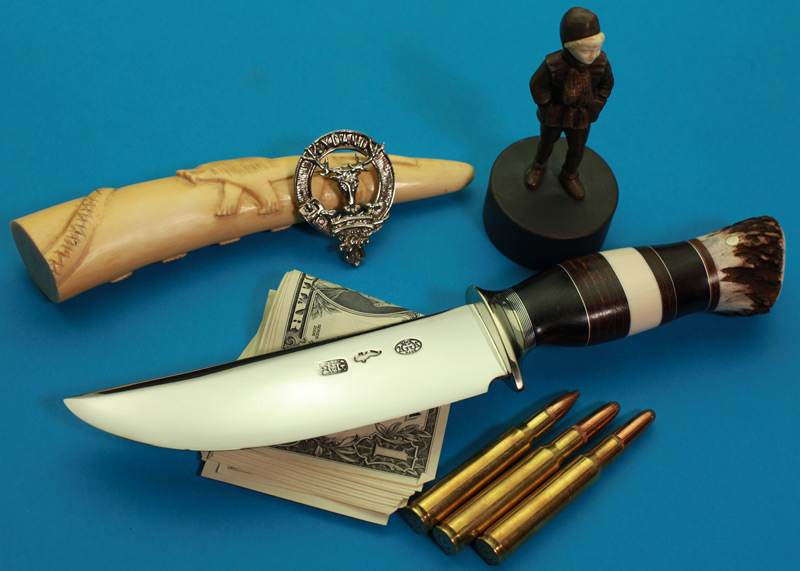
Modern replica of Scagel style hunting knife, made by 2G knives Mallorca

From 1920 through 1929, Scagel sold his knives through Abercrombie & Fitch of New York and their subsidiaries such as Von Lengerke & Antoine. Scagel made hunting knives, machetes, and axes for the expeditions of the Smithsonian Institution. Scagel made a variety of knives throughout his career including Bowie knives, fighting knives, and pocketknives. One of the rarest of Scagel's knives is his personal hunting knife pattern, a fixed blade drop-point hunter with a secondary folding spey-blade in the handle. Valued at over $15,000, seven of the twelve made are accounted for in private collections.

Scagel used a half stag and half leather stacked washer assembly in his knife handles that became his trademark style. One such Scagel knife provided the influence for Bo Randall to start making his own knives. In 1937, Randall witnessed someone using a Scagel knife to scrape paint off of a boat near Walloon Lake, without damaging the edge of the blade. Randall bought the knife and in the years that followed Scagel became a mentor to Randall, influencing many of his designs. In addition to leather and stag handles, Scagel had several friends who worked at the Brunswick Pool Table and Bowling Ball Company who kept him supplied with scrap pieces of ivory, rosewood, bakelite, vulcanized fiber, and maple spacers which he used in his knife handles over the years.

Every knife Scagel made was completely by hand and without modern tools such as a grinder or buffer, his Fruitport shop was powered off a gasoline engine from a Cadillac automobile and as a result, the quantity of knives he produced over his 50 years of knifemaking is very low. Scagel was known for not trusting "mass produced items" and even made his own rifle for hunting. Scagel never visited doctors, resetting his own broken wrist at one time and successfully extracting his own teeth and making his own dentures. During a polio epidemic in 1939, he made leg braces for children at his shop. He made his last knife in 1962, the year before he died. Twenty-three years later he was inducted into the Blade magazine Cutlery Hall of Fame at the 1990 Blade Show. In 1996, Scagel was inducted into the American Bladesmith Society Hall of Fame as an inauguree. The Randall Knife Museum in Orlando, Florida is home to the world's largest collection of Scagel's knives.
