= Gerber 31-001901 Bear Grylls Ultimate Pro =

Gerber Ultimate Survival Knife
- Type: Survival Knife
- Place of origin: Portland, Oregon (1939)

Production history
- Designer: Pete Gerber, Bear Grylls
- Manufacturer: Gerber Legendary Blades
- Produced: 2000–present

Specifications
- Mass: 13.7 oz (390 g)

The Gerber Ultimate Survival Knife is a survival knife made by Gerber Legendary Blades in Portland, Oregon.

== History ==
The Gerber Ultimate Survival Knife was the first in the Bear Grylls Ultimate Survival Knife series created in the early 2000s in collaboration with Bear Grylls and Gerber.

In April 2013, Gerber released the Ultimate Pro Knife as an improved version of the original Ultimate Survival knife.

== Design ==
The knife itself comes as more of a survival kit compared to most standard survival knives, including a firestriker flint and scabbard in the complete package.

== Variant ==
=== Ultimate Pro ===
The biggest of the improvements saw the Ultimate Pro issued as a full tang knife, increasing its stability and strength.

This, together with the knife's endorsement by Bear Grylls, contributed to Gerber's reputation as a knife manufacturer.

== Criticism ==
The original Gerber Ultimate Survival Knife received many criticisms up until the release of the Ultimate Pro Knife.

Some of these complaints included its weak pommel, handle, and blade. The makers responded with a number of improvements to address the complaints and the release of the Ultimate Pro variant.
