= Randall Made Knives =

American manufacturer of knives

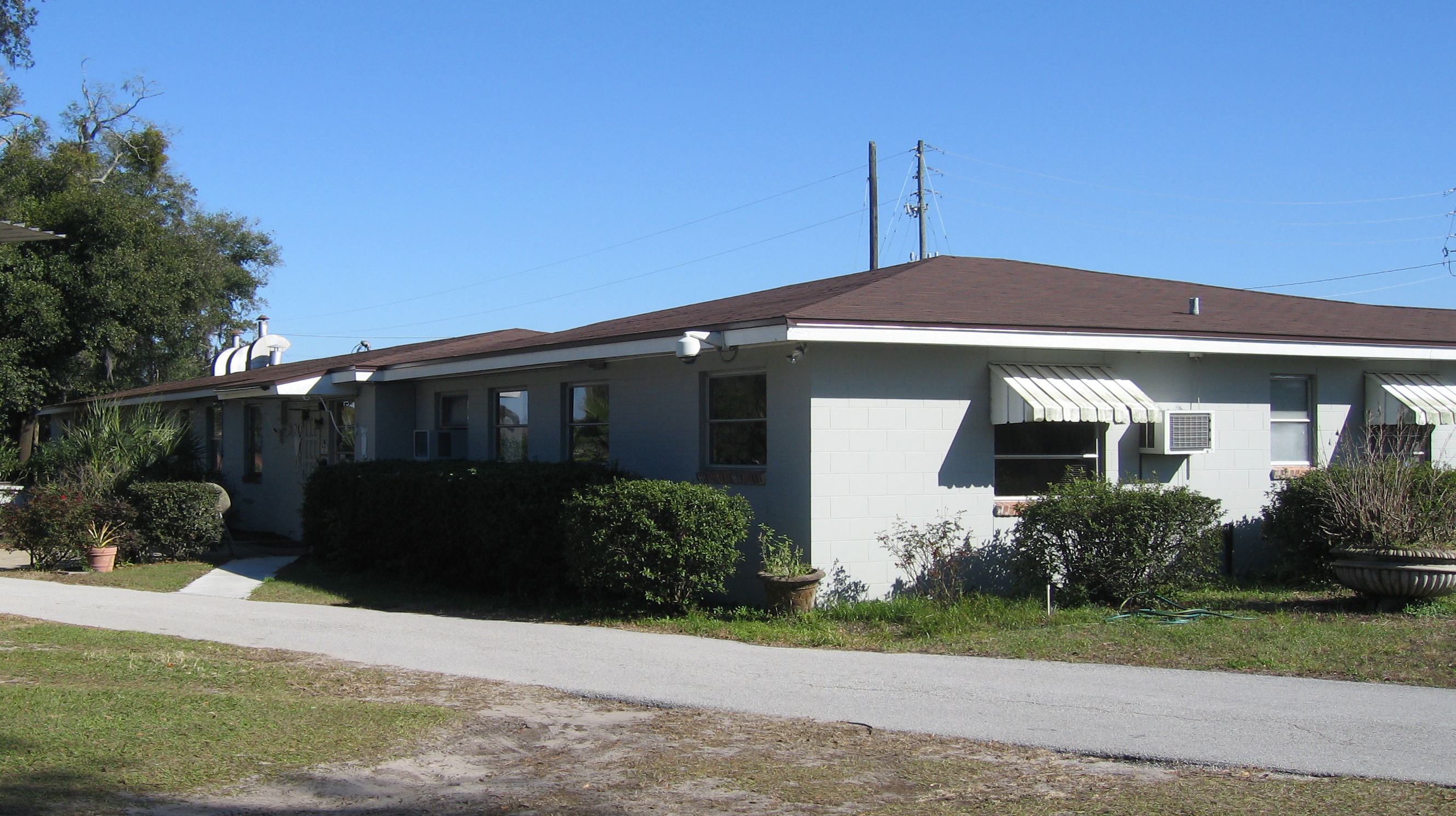
- Type: Private
- Industry: Manufacturing
- Founded: 1938; 88 years ago
- Founder: Walter Doane "Bo" Randall, Jr.
- Headquarters: 4857 S. Orange Blossom Trail; Orlando, Florida
- Key people: "Bo" Randall and his son Gary
- Products: Custom Handmade Knives
- Number of employees: About 20
- Website: Randall Made Knives

Randall Made Knives, usually referred to as Randall, is an American custom handcrafted knife manufacturer founded by Walter Doane "Bo" Randall, Jr. in the U.S. The knife making shop and showroom is located in Orlando, Florida. Randall began making knives as a hobby in 1937. His son and grandson continue the family trade along with 20 staff producing about 8,000 knives per year in South Orange Blossom Trail.

Randall offers 28 models of knives for different applications, each customizable at the factory based on customer specification. Randall hand forges nearly all models of knives instead of using factory stamping or stock removal, one of few manufacturers to do so. Randall uses a 17-step process for making knives, which usually takes over 8 hours to complete. The waiting list for obtaining a Randall from the shop is typically six years.

Two examples of Randall's Model 17 "Astro", designed for the use of astronauts, are on display in the Smithsonian Institution. The company operates its own museum containing more than 7,000 knives and other edged weapons, including one of the world's largest collections of pocketknives.

== History ==
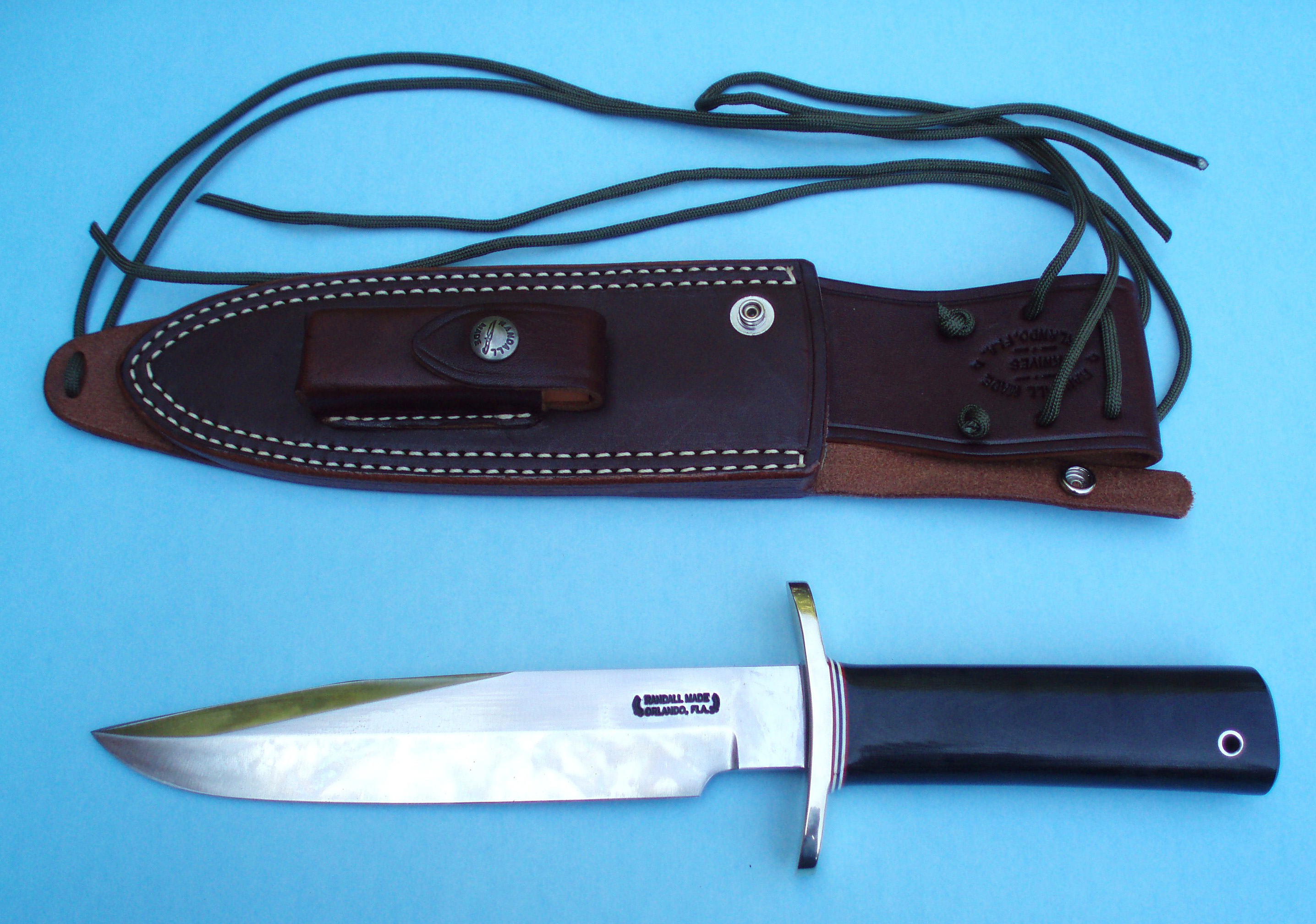
Model 14 "Attack"

Bo Randall first became interested in making knives after he purchased a Bill Scagel knife that was being used to scrape paint off of a boat without showing any signs of wear or damage. He made his first knife in his garage at Lake Ivanhoe, Florida using an auto spring.

He founded the company in 1938. Although Randall originally designed his knives for outdoorsmen and sold them at sporting goods stores, demand from military customers initially provided his biggest boost in business and launched his company nationally.

In the early 1940s, Randall knives significantly increased in popularity after receiving good publicity during World War II. Several noted war heroes and GIs on all fronts carried Randall knives with them into major battles, including top American Ace Richard Bong, Lieutenant General James M. Gavin, commander of the 82nd Airborne Division during the Normandy invasion. Army Air Force Captain Ronald Reagan, future U.S. President, owned a Randall knife in World War II. Randalls were so popular that GIs from overseas ordered through the mail by simply addressing letters to the "Knife Man, Orlando".

Model 16 SP#1 "Special #1 Fighter"

Shortly after the war, the popularity of Randall knives increased among non-military users, and Randall developed additional models specifically for expanding markets. In 1956, Randall received a United States design patent for models 14 and 15. In 1957, bestselling author James Jones mentioned Randall knives in his book Some Came Running, and subsequently helped Randall to design a diver's knife. In the Vietnam War, General William Westmoreland, Commander of American military operations in Vietnam, was often photographed with a Randall. Pilot Gary Powers of the 1960 U-2 incident, and herpetologist Ross Allen, carried Randalls. In 1982, Randall was inducted into the Blade Magazine Cutlery Hall of Fame at the Blade Show in Atlanta, Georgia.

Bo Randall died in 1989 in Orlando, Florida, at 80 years of age. His son, Gary Randall, currently oversees production at Randall made Knives.

Bo Randall was inducted into the Blade magazine Cutlery Hall of Fame at the 1983 Blade Show as an inauguree. In 1997, Randall was inducted into the American Bladesmith Society Hall of Fame. In 2001, Randall's knives were listed as "Best Sheath Knife" as part of Forbes "50 Best List".

=== Randall in space ===
The first knife to journey into space was the Randall Model 17 Astro Knife. It was conceived by Major L. Gordon Cooper, Jr. to be a survival knife specifically for astronauts. Proper design and construction were crucial, for astronauts orbited over deserts and jungles, as well as ocean. Cooper studied many factory-made knives, but found none to be satisfactory. He finally turned to knifemaker, Bo Randall.

As the U.S. began its space program, NASA needed a survival knife for its astronauts, and Major Gordon Cooper worked with Randall on the design of the Model 17 "Astro". These first astronauts carried their Randalls into space. In 1999, the Liberty Bell 7 Mercury space capsule was recovered from the ocean with astronaut Gus Grissom's Randall knife inside. Despite having spent 40 years at a depth of 15,000 feet (4,600 m) underwater, the knife was still serviceable after a good cleaning. The Smithsonian Institution has two Astros on display.

== Randall Made knives museum ==
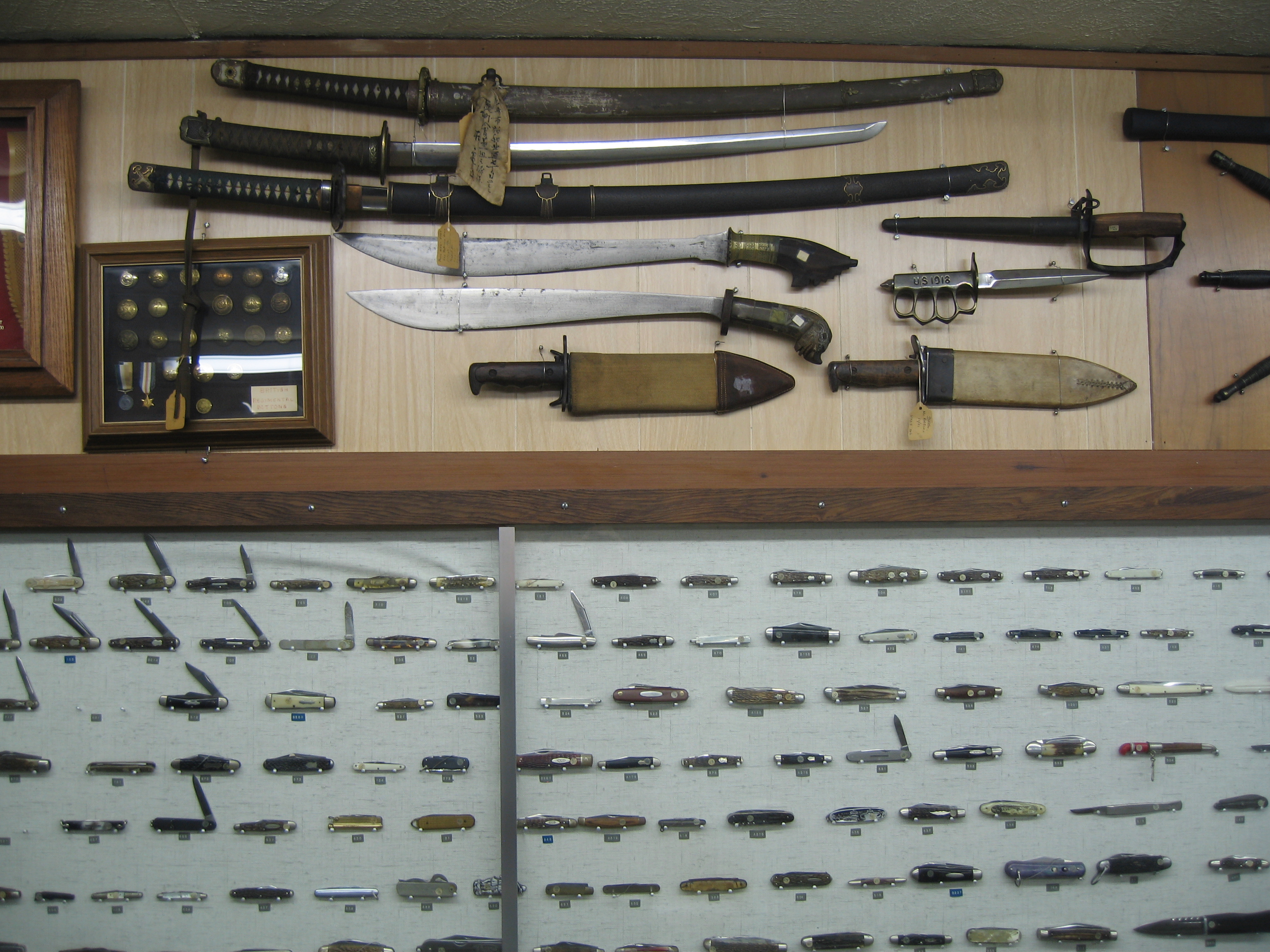
Display at Randall Made Knives Museum

The Randall Made Knives Museum is located at the shop facility in Orlando and contains more than 7,000–knives and other edged weapons. It has one of the largest collections of pocketknives in the world and home to the world's largest collection of Bill Scagel's knives. The museum contains many historical pictures and documents related to Randall knives. Randall plans to move the museum to a larger facility.

== Models ==
Various models of Randall knives are listed below, along with years of introduction (in parentheses).

=== Bowie knives ===
- Model 6 "Steak Knife" (also called "All-Purpose Carving Knife") (1945)
- Model 12 "Bowie" (also called "Smithsonian Bowie") (1953)
- Model 13-12 "Arkansas Toothpick" (1953)

=== Military style knives ===
- Model 1 "All Purpose Fighting Knife" (1943)
- Model 2 "Fighting Stiletto" (1944)
- Model 14 "Attack" (1954)
- Model 15 "Airman" (1954)
- Model 16 SP#1 "Special #1 Fighter" or "Diver's Knife", slightly modified Bowie pattern that is designed for use around water. (1959)
- Model 24 "Guardian" (1979)

=== Outdoorsmen knives ===
- Model 3 "Hunter" (1944)
- Model 4 "Big Game and Skinner" (1945)
- Model 5 "Camp and Trail Knife" (1945)
- Model 7 "Fisherman-Hunter" (1945)
- Model 8 "Trout and Bird Knife" (1946)
- Model 9 "Pro-Thrower" (1947)
- Model 25 "The Trapper" (1988)
- Model 26 "Pathfinder" (1993)
- Model 27 "Trailblazer" (1999)
- Model 28 "Woodsman"

=== Saltwater knives ===
- Model 10 "Salt Fisherman and Household Utility" (1948)
- Model 16 "Diver's Knife" (1959)

=== Skinning and hunting knives ===
- Model 11 "Alaskan Skinner" (1952)
- Model 19 "Bushmaster" (1963)
- Model 20 "Yukon Skinner" (1963)
- Model 21 "Little Game" (1967)
- Model 22 "Outdoorsman" (1971)
- Model 23 "Gamemaster" (1972)

=== Survival knives ===
- Model 17 "Astro" (1963)
- Model 18 "Attack-Survival" (1963)
