= Buster Warenski =

American bladesmith (1942–2005)

- Born: June 5, 1942; Kimberly, Nevada, U.S.
- Died: July 31, 2005 (aged 63); Richfield, Utah, U.S.
- Occupations: Knifemaker, bladesmith
- Spouse: Julie Warenski

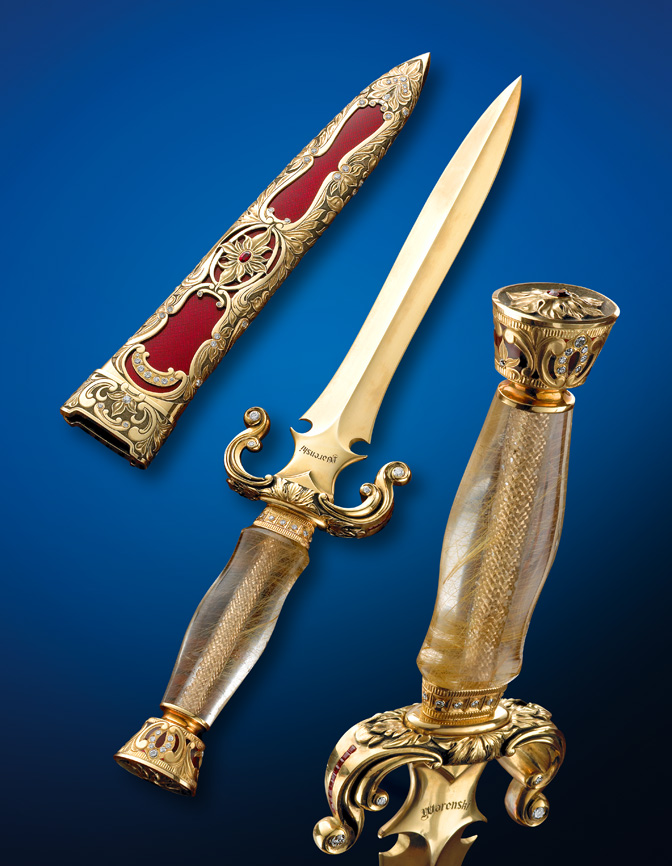
Art knife by Warenski

Buster Warenski (June 5, 1942 – July 31, 2005) was an American custom knifemaker from Kimberly, Nevada who made "Art Knives" utilizing gold and other precious metals. Warenski is best known for making a reproduction of Tutankhamun's dagger with a forged gold blade; over 32 ounces of gold were used in the construction of the dagger, making it one of the most valuable knives made in recent years.

== Knifemaking career ==
Warenski began making knives as a hobby in 1966 after seeing a picture of a knife made by Gil Hibben. Warenski made his first knife from a file and took it to show Hibben; after seeing Hibben's finished knives, he toured Hibben's shop and learned some basic techniques from him. In June 1972 he was hired by Harvey Draper to grind blades and assist him at Draper Knives, but the operation went bankrupt by December of the same year. Warenski became a full-time knifemaker in 1975. He was a president of the Knifemakers' Guild for 2 terms and a Blade Magazine member of the Cutlery Hall of Fame.

Prior to 1975, Warenski made practical knives of all types, particularly hunting knives and skinners, but rose to fame for his "Legacy Knives" series of artistic pieces which he made exclusively from 1975 onwards. Warenski built a recreation of the gold dagger found in King Tut's tomb. It took five years for him to complete, and it contained 32 ounces of gold including a blade cast from gold and specially heat treated. This knife began as stand-alone project, but was later considered the first of his "Legacy Knives". It was once valued at $1 million (USD).

He followed this recreation with a knife he called "The Gem of the Orient", which incorporated 153 emeralds totaling 10 karats and 9 diamonds with a total weight of 5 karats. These gems were set to accent the gold filigree which overlaid the jade handle. It took Warenski ten years to complete this knife and it was sold for $2.1 million (US). The third knife in this series was named "Fire and Ice"; this knife contained 28 ounces of 18K gold, 22 rubies totaling 4.25 karats and 75 diamonds totaling 7 karats. The handle for this knife was constructed of quartz, accented with red enamel. A fourth knife was planned, but not finished.

With the exception of any damascus steel used in the knives, which Warenski ordered as a blank from an ABS Mastersmith and ground himself, all of his knives were sole-authorship, meaning he made and finished every part of the knife including making sheaths and engraving. After 1986, his wife, Julie Warenski, aided him with the engraving and gold embellishments.

Warenski died of a heart attack in 2005.
