= Bo Randall =

American knifemaker (1908–1989)

- Born: Walter Doane Randall Jr. September 27, 1909; Cincinnati, Ohio
- Died: December 25, 1989 (aged 80)
- Other names: Walter Doane Randall Jr., WD Randall
- Occupations: Knifemaker, bladesmith
- Spouse: Ruth Randall
- Awards: Blade Cutlery Hall of Fame

Bo Randall (September 27, 1909 – December 25, 1989) was an American knifemaker who founded Randall Made Knives in Orlando, Florida.

== Early life ==
Randall was born in Cincinnati, Ohio on September 27, 1909. His family moved to Orlando, Florida in 1916. As a youth Randall enjoyed hunting and fishing and went on to become a successful citrus rancher. He first became interested in making knives after he purchased in 1936 a William Scagel knife that was being used to scrape paint off of a boat without showing any signs of wear or damage.

== Knifemaking ==
Impressed with his Scagel knife, Randall located Scagel and asked him how to make knives. Over the years he visited Scagel and corresponded with him, becoming his "pupil" with regard to knifemaking. Randall forged his first knife out of a leaf spring from an automobile in his garage in Lake Ivanhoe, Florida with a handle of stag and made his first hunting knife. On his first hunting trip with that knife he sold it to a companion and made another, repeating the pattern of making knives and selling them to friends one at a time.

In 1938 Randall opened a shop in Orlando, Florida. Although Randall's initial efforts were inspired by Scagel's designs and were predominantly "sporting knives" for hunters and fisherman, a visit by a soldier bound for World War II changed that. Randall began production of the "All Purpose Fighting Knife" giving it the designation of "Number 1" in his catalog. Between 1942 and 1945, Randall Made Knives produced 4,000 of these knives for US Troops in the war, with approximately 1,058 subcontracted out to Northampton Cutlery Company in Springfield, Massachusetts to meet the demand. In the 1950s Randall would return to the pattern of the Bowie knife for several of his combat knife designs.

Randall designed the Model 17 Astro Model and built 7 of these knives for NASA. In addition to the knife that made 21 orbits around the Earth, several of Randall's knives are displayed in the Smithsonian Institution and in the Museum of Modern Art in New York City. One Model 8 "Trout and Bird Knife" was displayed in the Monino Airbase museum near Moscow as part of the equipment carried by U-2 pilot Francis Gary Powers who was shot down over the Soviet Union in 1960.

== Personal life ==
Randall's wife was Ruth Randall.

Randall died in 1989 in Orlando, Florida, at 80 years of age.

=== Legacy ===
Randall was inducted into the Blade magazine Cutlery Hall of Fame at the 1983 Blade Show as an inauguree. In 1997, Randall was inducted into the American Bladesmith Society Hall of Fame. In 2001, Randall's knives were listed as "Best Sheath Knife" as part of Forbes "50 Best List".
