= Knife collecting =

Type of hobby

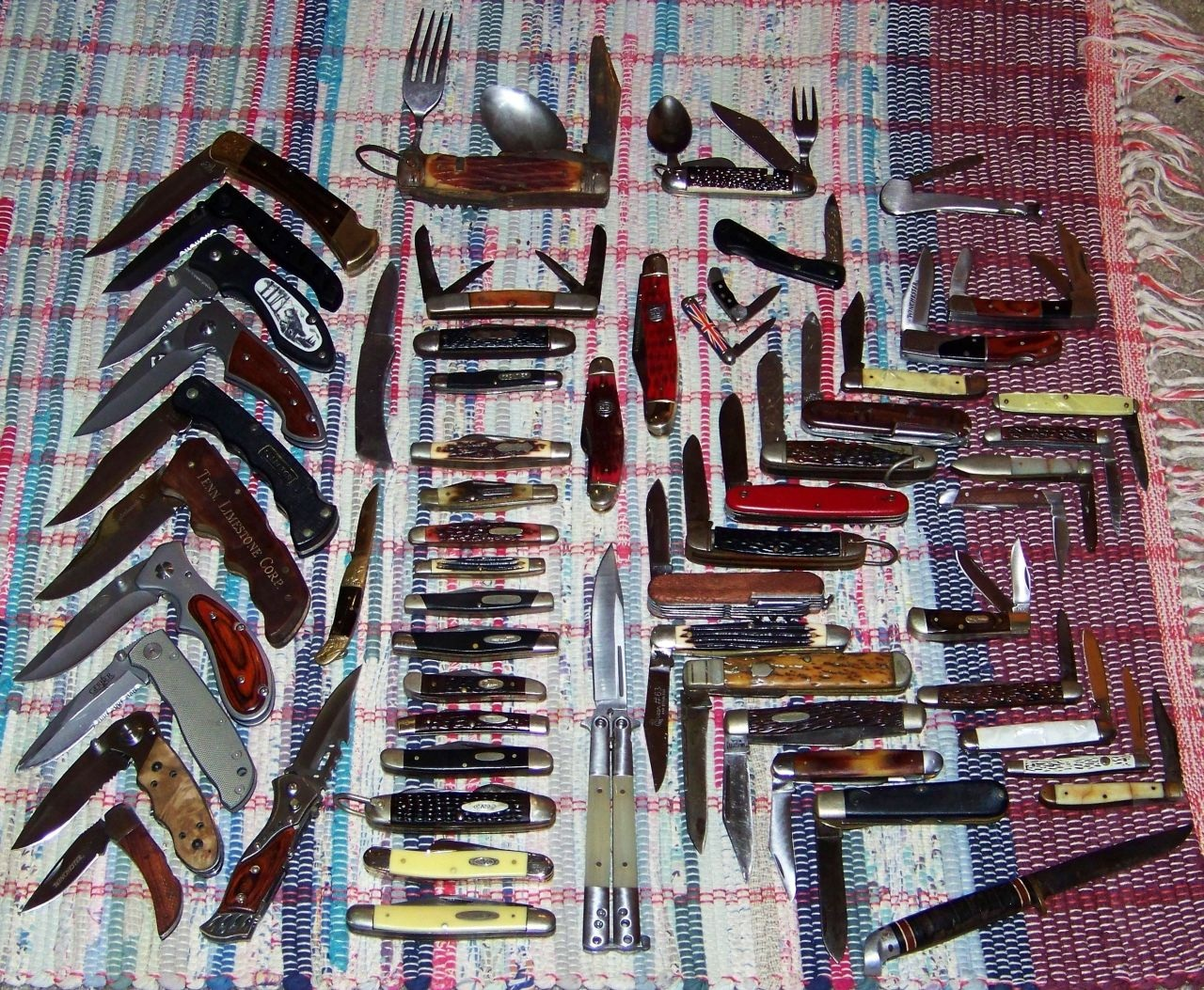
A collection of pocket knives.

Knife collecting is a hobby which includes seeking, locating, acquiring, organizing, cataloging, displaying, storing, and maintaining knives. Some collectors are generalists, accumulating an assortment of different knives. Others focus on a specialized area of interest, perhaps bayonets, knives from a particular factory, Bowie knives, pocketknives, or handmade custom knives.

The knives of collectors may be antiques or even marketed as collectible. Antiques are knives at least 100 years old; collectible knives are of a later vintage than antiques, and may even be new. Collectors and dealers may use the word vintage to describe older collectibles. Some knives which were once everyday objects may now be collectible since almost all those once produced have been destroyed or discarded, like certain WW2 era knives made with zinc alloy handles which are rapidly degrading due to the material's shelf life.

== History ==
Knives have been collected by individuals since the 19th century with formal collecting organizations beginning in the 1940s. The custom knife-collecting boom began in the late 1960s and continues to the present.

== Beginning a collection ==
Some novice knife collectors start by purchasing knives that appeal to them, and then slowly work at acquiring knowledge about how to build a collection. Others (more cautious or studious types) want to develop some background in the field before starting to buy knives.

In general, knives of significance, artistic beauty, values or interest that are "too young" to be considered antiques, fall into the realm of collectibles. But not all collectibles are limited editions, and many of them have been around for decades.

Many knife collectors enjoy making a plan for their collections, combining education and experimentation to develop a personal collecting style, and even those who reject the notion of "planned collecting" can refine their "selection skills" with some background information on the methods of collecting.

== Strategies ==
Knife magazines such as Knives Illustrated and Blade are one of the most popular means to learn more about the field. Attending knife shows, gun shows, and militaria shows is another way for collectors to familiarize themselves with the hobby. These shows sometimes include seminars on a variety of subjects such as knife making seminars, the history of knife companies, starting a collection or how to insure a collection. There are a number of books dedicated to collecting knives.

Although national and international collector clubs exist such as the National Knife Collectors Association. A collector may find and join a local knife club to meet other people who collect knives. Knife publications frequently list the location, date and time of club meetings as a service to new collectors. Collectors who have already narrowed their collecting focus to the knives of a particular maker or factory may want to join a club that focuses on this producer's work, such as the Randall Knife Society, Emerson's Collector Club, etc.

== Types of collections ==
Knife collections are varied and run the gamut from collections of $5US pocketknives to $100,000US art knives.

Collecting antique Bowie knives is one of the higher-end forms of knife collecting with rare models selling for more than $200,000. Even mass-produced Sheffield Bowies from the 19th century can sell in the range of $5,000US to $15,000US.

== The Internet ==
A potential collector may wish to chat with other knife collectors in specialized discussion forums via the Internet. Discussion includes information about where they have been successful in acquiring their knives, where they have struggled and what they are looking for. Internet Knife forums allow for an open exchange of information, sometimes with experts and makers available to answer questions and offer guidance. In addition, several web-sites specializing exclusively in the selling and trading of knives exist.

=== Knife discussion forums ===
There are a number of Usenet and Internet forums dedicated to the discussion of knives and knife collecting. The oldest of such forums is rec.knives, a Usenet group started in 1992. The largest is BladeForums.com with over 250,000 members which primarily emphasizes production knives. Manufacturers such as Cold Steel, Spyderco, and Benchmade have established their own forums giving them input from users and a method of responding to customer service issues in a timely fashion. Some forums such as Usual Suspects Network have gone so far as to host their own knife shows on a scale similar to Blade magazine's annual Blade Show.

== Secondary market ==
The retail price of a knife is valid only at the moment it was purchased. Once the knife comes into the buyer’s possession, its value is linked to what is called the secondary market. Once a knife is purchased, most of the costs associated with the retail price (i.e. advertising, production cost, shipping cost, etc.) must be deducted from the retail cost to determine the object’s immediate value on the secondary market, thus, retail cost is not equivalent to secondary market resale value. Depending on several different factors, individuals, auctioneers, and secondary retailers may sell a knife for more, the same, or less than what they originally paid for it. These factors include, but are not limited to, condition, age, supply, and demand.

The 1960s through the present were major years for the manufacturing of contemporary collectible knives. While some individuals purchased these knives to enjoy and use, many purchased them as investments. A speculative secondary markets developed for many knives in the 1990s. Because so many people bought for investment purposes, duplicates are common. And although many knives were labeled as "limited editions," the actual number of items produced was very large. The result of this is that there is very little demand for many (but not all) items produced during this time period, which means their secondary market values are often low.

Some custom knife makers have large followings of collectors. Because demand far outweighs the supply, it is not uncommon for these knives to appreciate substantially within seconds of buying them from the maker. The secondary market can range anywhere from 50% to 200% of the knife's original value.

A price guide is a resource such as a book or website that lists typical selling prices. Most knife publications offer annual price guides to give collectors an idea of what their knives may be worth.

== Bibliography ==
- Darom, David; Eric Eggly; Francesco Pachi; Paolo Saviolo (April 30, 2008). The Great Collections (Modern Custom Knives). Chartwell Books. p. 288. ISBN 978-0-7858-2360-5.
- Langston, Richard V. (2001). Collector's Guide to Switchblade Knives: An Illustrated Historical and Price Reference. Boulder, CO: Paladin Press. p. 210. ISBN 978-1-58160-283-8.
- Pfeiffer, Steve (2009). Collecting Case Knives: Identification and Price Guide. Iola, WI: Krause Publications. p. 303. ISBN 978-1-4402-0238-4.
- Shackleford, Steve (2005). Blade's guide to knives & their values. Krause Publications. p. 576. ISBN 978-0-87349-913-2.
- Stewart, Ron (2009). The Standard Knife Collector's Guide: Identification & Values. Collector Books. p. 782. ISBN 978-1-57432-618-5.
