= Gil Hibben =

American custom knifemaker from Wyoming

Gilbert W. Hibben
- Born: September 4, 1935 (age 90); Wyoming, US
- Occupations: Knifemaker, bladesmith
- Spouse: Linda Hibben

Gil Hibben (born September 4, 1935) is an American custom knifemaker from Wyoming who is based in La Grange, Kentucky. Hibben designed the first line of Browning hunting knives in 1968, the American Kenpo Knife for Ed Parker, and the Rambo Knife for the 1988 film Rambo III and the 2008 film Rambo. Hibben's "Fantasy Knives" have been used in over 37 films and television shows, particularly science fiction, earning him the title "Klingon Armorer" from the Star Trek franchise. Hibben currently serves as a President of the Knifemakers' Guild, a post he has held for fourteen years.

== Early life ==
Hibben was born in Wyoming in 1935. Unable to afford a Bowie knife at age 15, Hibben decided to make his own out of scrap metal and files. He did not make another knife until his discharge from the US Navy in 1956 when he took a job in Seattle, Washington as a machinist for Boeing Aircraft and started making knives in his spare time after he sold another handmade Bowie knife to a friend for $45.

== Knifemaker ==
In 1964, Hibben relocated to Sandy, Utah to become a full-time knifemaker. His blades were primarily 440C stainless steel and Hibben was the first knife maker to use that steel in his knives. While in Sandy, Hibben partnered with another knifemaker named Stuart Benedict and these knives were sold under the name "Ben-Hibben". The knives from this time period were fixed-blade Bowie knives, hunting knives, fishing knives and some early fighting knives.

In 1965, Hibben left Sandy for Manti, Utah to open a larger facility where he operated as "Hibben Knives". One of his knives was written about and featured on the cover of Guns & Ammo in an article titled The Versatile Gil Hibben, expanding his reputation beyond that of a local knifemaker. This recognition lead him to the attention of Browning Arms Company, who had Hibben design the company's first line of knives in 1968 consisting of 3 fixed blade knives and a folding hunting knife. That same year, Hibben sang Tenor for the Mormon Tabernacle Choir.

A lifelong martial artist with black belt rankings in Aikido, Judo, and American Kenpo, Hibben designed and built a knife called the Kenpo Knife as his Black Belt Thesis under Ed Parker in 1968; his thesis and knife design led to Long Form VIII ("Double Dagger Form") which uses two knives in mock combat.

In 1970, Hibben moved his shop again. After a brief period in Springdale, Arkansas, he relocated to Alaska for five years working as a knifemaker and a hunting and fishing guide. In 1975 he moved his shop again to Silver Dollar City, Missouri and four years later to Louisville, Kentucky.

=== Movie knives ===
While in Louisville, Hibben was contacted by Sylvester Stallone to make a modern version of a Bowie knife for the film Rambo III. After the release of the movie, Hibben began a long-term partnership with United Cutlery of Taiwan who released factory versions of the "Rambo III Knife" and a subsequent annual factory "Art Knife" each based on one of Hibben's custom designs every year afterward. United has made versions of Hibben's Kenpo Knife, Alaskan Guide Knife, and throwing knives. Hibben previously partnered with knifemaker Dr. Rob Charlton of Damascus-USA to produce smaller Damascus steel versions of the Rambo Bowie. In 1991, Hibben relocated to the Louisville suburb of La Grange, Kentucky.

The popularity of Hibben's mass-produced fantasy designs led to Hibben's knives being used in other films such as Spawn, Mortal Kombat, The Perfect Weapon, Natural Born Killers, Under Siege, Babylon 5 and the Star Trek franchise. Hibben's "Jackal" knife appears on the poster for Star Trek Nemesis. Hibben made another "Rambo" knife for Stallone's Rambo and the Bowie knife and Arkansas toothpick used in the film, The Expendables. Paramount Pictures has given Hibben the title Official Klingon Armorer for all the weapons he has made for the Franchise's villains.

Hibben's Fantasy Knives were mass-produced by United Cutlery with at least one annual edition from 1994 until 2005. The first of these was a silver wire wrapped handle version of the V-42 stiletto.

== Knifemaker's Guild ==
Hibben has been President of the Knifemakers' Guild since 2006 and is a member of the Blade Magazine Cutlery Hall of Fame.
