= Blackie Collins =

American knife maker

- Born: Walter Wells Collins; 1939; Florence, South Carolina, US
- Died: July 20, 2011 (aged 71); North, South Carolina
- Occupations: Knifemaker, magazine editor
- Awards: Blade Cutlery Hall of Fame

Walter Wells "Blackie" Collins (1939 – July 20, 2011) was an American knife maker who designed and popularized the assisted opening mechanism and various automatic knife designs within the art of knifemaking. He is cited by other knifemakers and collectors as one of the most innovative knife designers in the world and was an author and the founder of what became Blade Magazine. Collins died July 20, 2011, in a motorcycle accident near North, South Carolina.

== Early life ==
Collins was born in Florence, South Carolina. He made his first knife when he was in the second grade.

== Knifemaking ==
Collins designed the bowie/survival knives series for Smith & Wesson in 1971 and was involved in designing their commemorative knives from 1971 to 1978. In the late 1960s-early 1970s he also made knives under the name of Blackie Sewell and had a shop in the original Underground Atlanta. In 1981, Collins' designed a knife for Gerber Legendary Blades named the LST (light, strong, tough). The LST was the first knife to feature injection molded Zytel handles and featured a total of six parts. His next design was an assisted opening knife called the Strut and Cut; the design for which came from motorcycling. The Strut and Cut's opening mechanism was based on his Ducati's single strut which enables the knife to open and close easily.

Collins was a founding member, with ten other knife designers/makers, of the Knifemakers' Guild. He founded the magazine known as American Blade in 1973, which he sold in 1982 and the renamed title was simply Blade. Collins was later an inductee into the Blade Magazine Hall of Fame.

Collins had other innovations beyond knifemaking and was an avid motorcyclist and a member of the National Rifle Association of America. He designed holsters and concealment clothing for carrying firearms. Collins designed a trigger lock, called the "Cease Fire" for rifles and a shooter's screwdriver.

== Written works ==
Collins authored books on knifemaking, scrimshaw, knife throwing, and personal defense.

- Collins, Blackie (1975). How knives are made (The Encyclopedia of American knives). Custom Knifemakers' Supply.
- Collins, Blackie; Felix Mirando (1976). The Pocketknife Manual - Building, Repairing and Refinishing Pocketknives. Knife World Publications.
- Collins, Blackie; McLoughlin, Chris (1977). Personal Defense. Knife World Publications.
- Collins, Blackie (1978). Knife Throwing: Sport Survival Defense. Knife World Publications.
- Collins, Blackie; Michael Collins (1978). How to Scrimshaw and Carve Ivory. Knife World Publications.
