= Knifemakers' Guild =

American organization for knifemakers

The Knifemakers' Guild is an American organization, based in Richfield, Utah, made up of knifemakers to promote custom knives, encourage ethical business practices, assist with technical aspects of knife making, and to sponsor knife shows. The Guild is composed of 300 knifemaker members and several thousand collectors, writers, and other investors as honorary members.

== History ==
The idea for the Knifemakers' Guild came about at a Las Vegas, Nevada, gun show held at the Sahara Casino in February 1970. The actual founding occurred in November 1970 by A.G. Russell in Tulsa, Oklahoma. Charter members included Blackie Collins, Bob Loveless, John Nelson Cooper, and Dan Dennehy. Russell was made the first president with Loveless as the secretary.

The current president is Todd Begg, past presidents have included Jimmy Lile, Frank Centofante, D'Alton Holder, George Herron, Buster Warenski, and William F. Moran. The Knifemakers' Guild has over 300 members worldwide.

The Knifemakers' Guild hosts an annual show where members meet once a year to conduct business, elect officers, and display their work. The show is attended by thousands of collectors.
