= Imperial Schrade =

American knife manufacturer

Imperial Schrade Corp. was an American knife manufacturer of hunting knives, pocketknives, utility knives, and bayonets during the 20th and early 21st centuries. The consolidation of five forerunner companies, including its namesakes, the Imperial Knife Company, founded 1916, and the Schrade Cutlery Company, founded in 1904, Imperial Schrade manufactured its products in the United States and Ireland and sold through hardware stores, department stores, and on military bases. The original company's fortunes declined and in 2004 it entered into bankruptcy where all equipment and intellectual property was sold off to reimburse creditors. The name and intellectual property (but not the factory nor equipment) was bought by Taylor Brands and used for marketing purposes. As of 2016, these brands are owned by Smith & Wesson.

== History ==
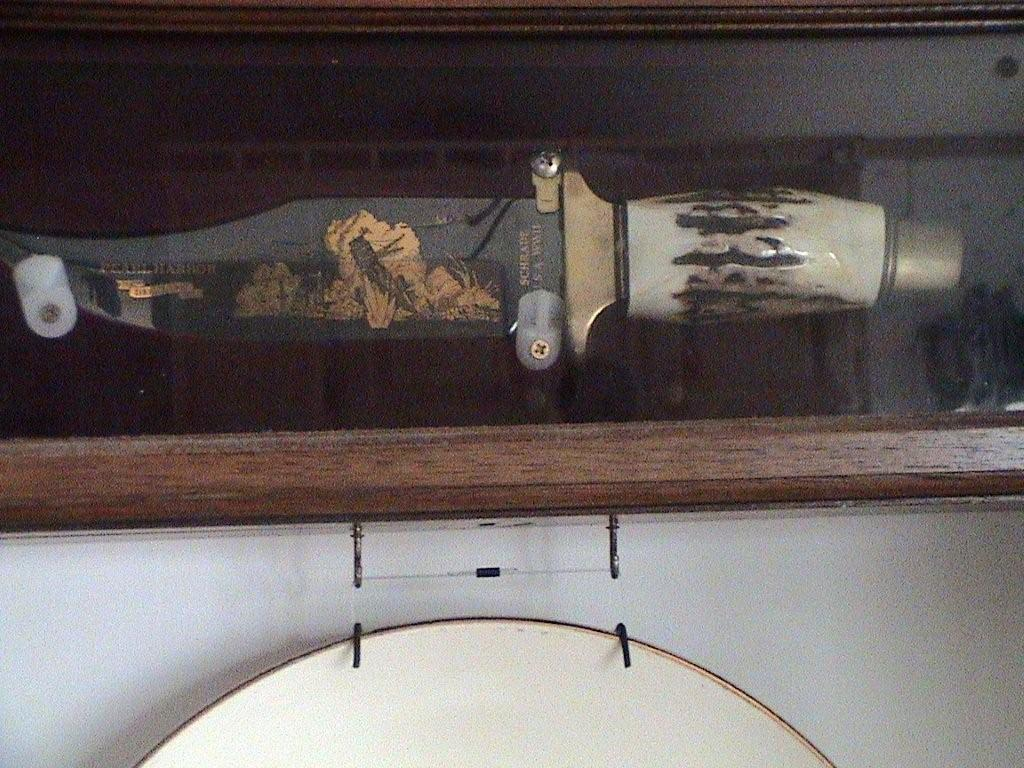
Pearl Harbor commemorative knife from Schrade

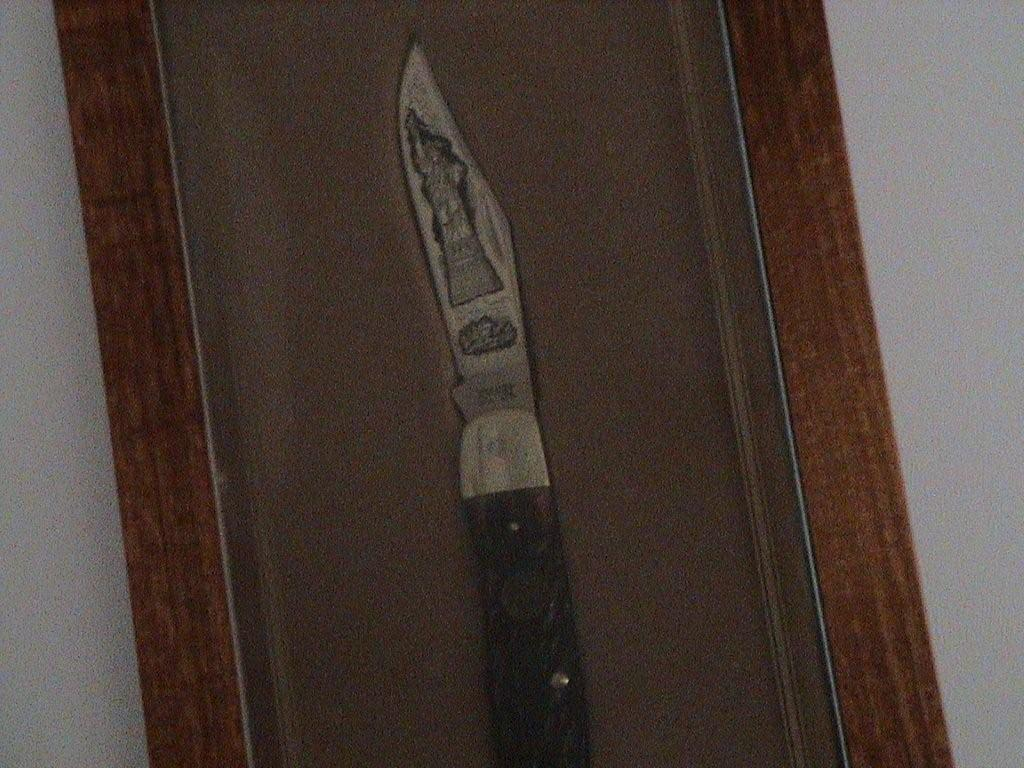
Statue of Liberty commemorative knife from Schrade

=== Imperial Knife ===
The Imperial Knife Company had its roots at the Empire Knife Company in Winsted, Connecticut. In 1916, two men named Felix and Michael Mirando moved from Frosolone Molise in Italy to Providence, Rhode Island to be near its jewelry industry and began making skeletons for “waldemar,” or pocket watch chain knives. With their friend Domenic Fazzano as manager, they established the Imperial Knife Company, which would at one point grow to be the largest knife manufacturer in the United States. The company developed a number of successful innovations in the manufacture of commercial value-priced folding pocket knives.

In 1941, Albert M. Baer purchased the Ulster Knife Company (which was founded in Ellenville, New York, in the 1870s) and merged it with the Imperial Knife Company and designated this new business as the Imperial Knife Associated Companies, to produce knives for the military. Albert's brother, Henry Baer, was the company's first president and the namesake for Schrade's "Uncle Henry" line of knives.

Tang stamps bearing the Imperial name appeared until 1988 when they were discontinued and replaced by the Schrade name.

=== Schrade ===
Schrade Cutlery Company had its roots in the New York Press Button Knife Company, formed in 1892 by George Schrade, an inventor from Sheffield, England. Unable to raise sufficient capital to begin knife production, Schrade sold a partial interest in the company to the Walden Knife Company. The company's unusual name arose from its first knife design, a switchblade or automatic-opening pocket knife with an operating button mounted in the knife bolster. First patented by Schrade in 1892, the knife was eventually produced with a unique style of clip point blade. In 1903, Schrade sold all of his interest in the New York Press Button Knife Co. to Walden Knife Company. The following year, Schrade formed the Schrade Cutlery Company in Walden.

In 1906–07, Schrade patented the Safety Pushbutton Knives, an improved series of switchblade knives with side-mounted operating button and a sliding safety switch. Later developed in slightly modified form as the Presto series, the Schrade switchblade would come to dominate the automatic knife market in the United States for the next fifty-five years.

From 1911–1916, George Schrade resided in the knifemaking center of Solingen, Germany, where he ran a small workshop. There Schrade developed a new type of switchblade knife, which he titled the Springer. However, in 1916 the German government seized all of Schrade's assets in Germany to assist its war production. Schrade returned to the United States, though his Springer switchblade would live on; now unprotected by patent, the type was manufactured by several Solingen shops for many years thereafter.

In 1917, Schrade licensed a flylock switchblade design to the Challenge Cutlery Company, which he then joined. Schrade pursued his knifemaking interests at both Challenge and at Schrade, where his brother George now managed one of the company's factories. In the 1920s, Schrade bought the defunct Walden Cutlery Company in order to obtain their stocks of handle material for his knives.

In 1928, the Challenge Cutlery Co. closed after the death of its owner, Charles F. Wiebusch. Schrade formed a new company, the Geo. Schrade Knife Co. in Bridgeport, acquiring knifemaking machinery from the old Challenge Cutlery assets. At the new company Schrade made Presto switchblades as well as Wire Jack jackknives, and other low-end pocket knives. George Schrade died in 1940 (According to; George Schrade died in 1945), and the Geo. Schrade Knife Co. was sold by his sons in 1956 to Boker Knife Co. of Newark, New Jersey, but the company closed operations in 1958 after Congress passed a law banning the sale of switchblades across state lines. Schrade's other company, the Schrade Cutlery Co., was sold in 1946 to the Imperial Knife Associated Companies, becoming the Schrade-Walden Cutlery Co., Inc.

=== Consolidation ===
The Baers purchased Schrade Cutlery Company in 1946 from J. Louis Schrade and renamed it the Schrade Walden Cutlery Corporation, a division of the Imperial Knife Associated Companies group. The Schrade-Walden division was moved from Walden, New York, to Ellenville, New York, after a fire consumed the factory in 1958, though the two companies would maintain separate manufacturing facilities. Imperial Knife had positive economic growth up to the late 1970s, but as the conglomerate entered the 1980s, a consolidation took place and the company divested itself of various holdings in order to streamline management.

In 1983, Albert M. Baer took the company private to ward off hostile investors by purchasing all outstanding stock in the company. The company changed names in 1985 to Imperial Schrade Corp. and Walter Gardiner was named President and COO. All U.S. operations were combined under one roof in Ellenville, the vacant Channel Master antenna factory. In the 1990s, the company entered the multi-tool market and the Baers were both inducted into the Blade Magazine Cutlery Hall of Fame.

In July 2004, the year the company celebrated its 100th anniversary, the factory in Ellenville was closed. The Schrade name was purchased by Taylor Brands LLC, who continued to manufacture products under the Schrade brand as well as Old Timer, Uncle Henry, Imperial, and Smith & Wesson knives. Production was moved to China.

In July 2016, Smith & Wesson Holding Corporation announced that its Battenfeld Technologies division was to purchase Taylor Brands.

== Gallery ==
Schrade

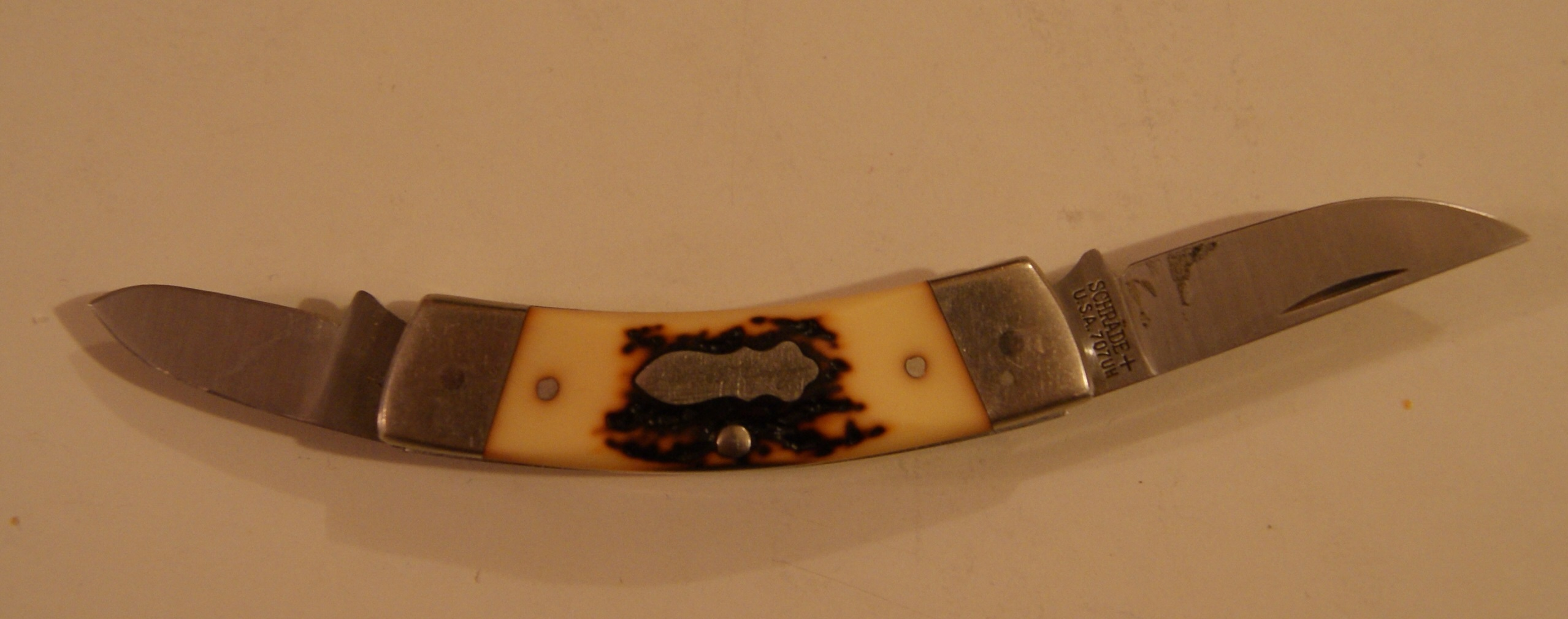
Schrade Uncle Henry 707UH 2-blade knife

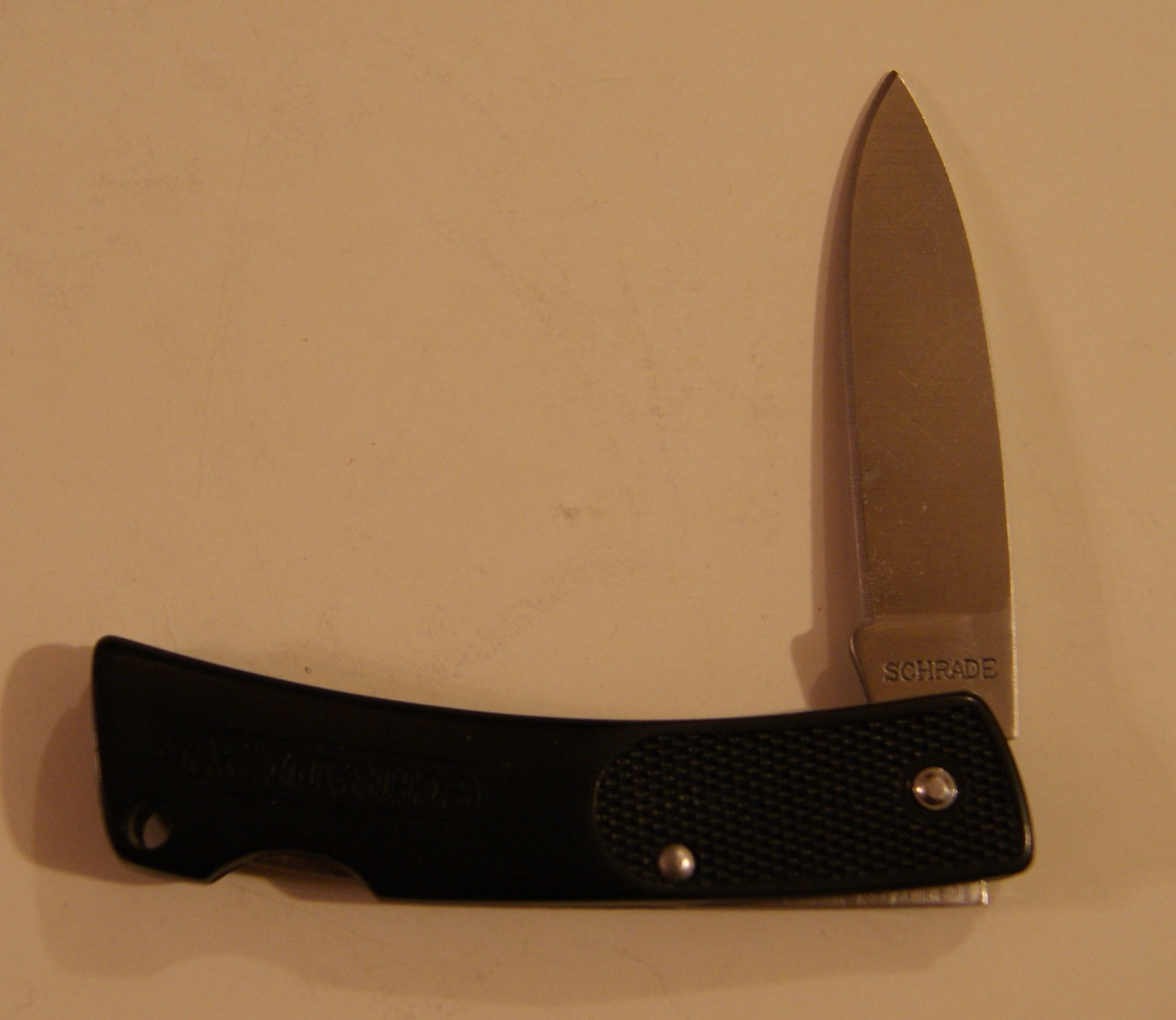
Schrade SP2 pocket knife

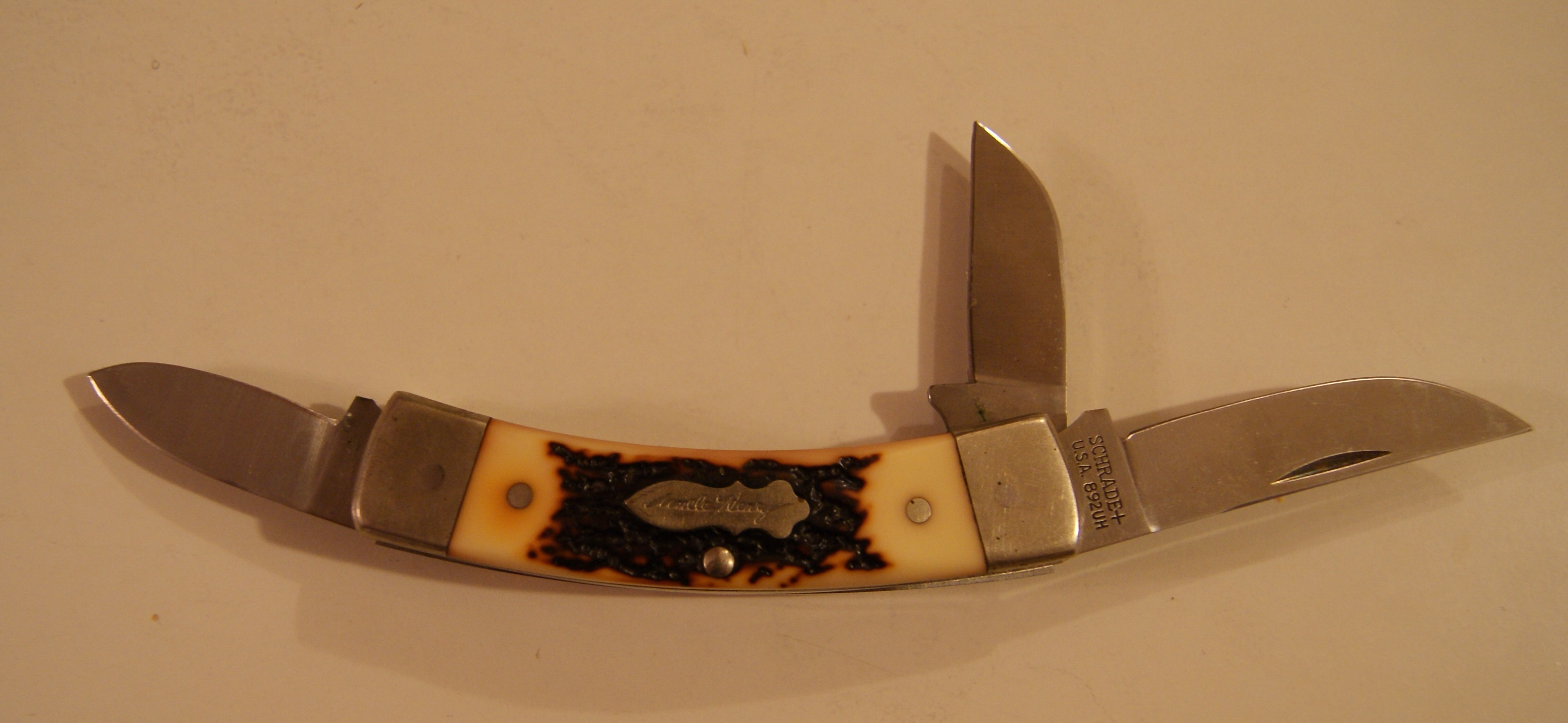
Schrade Uncle Henry 892UH 3-blade knife

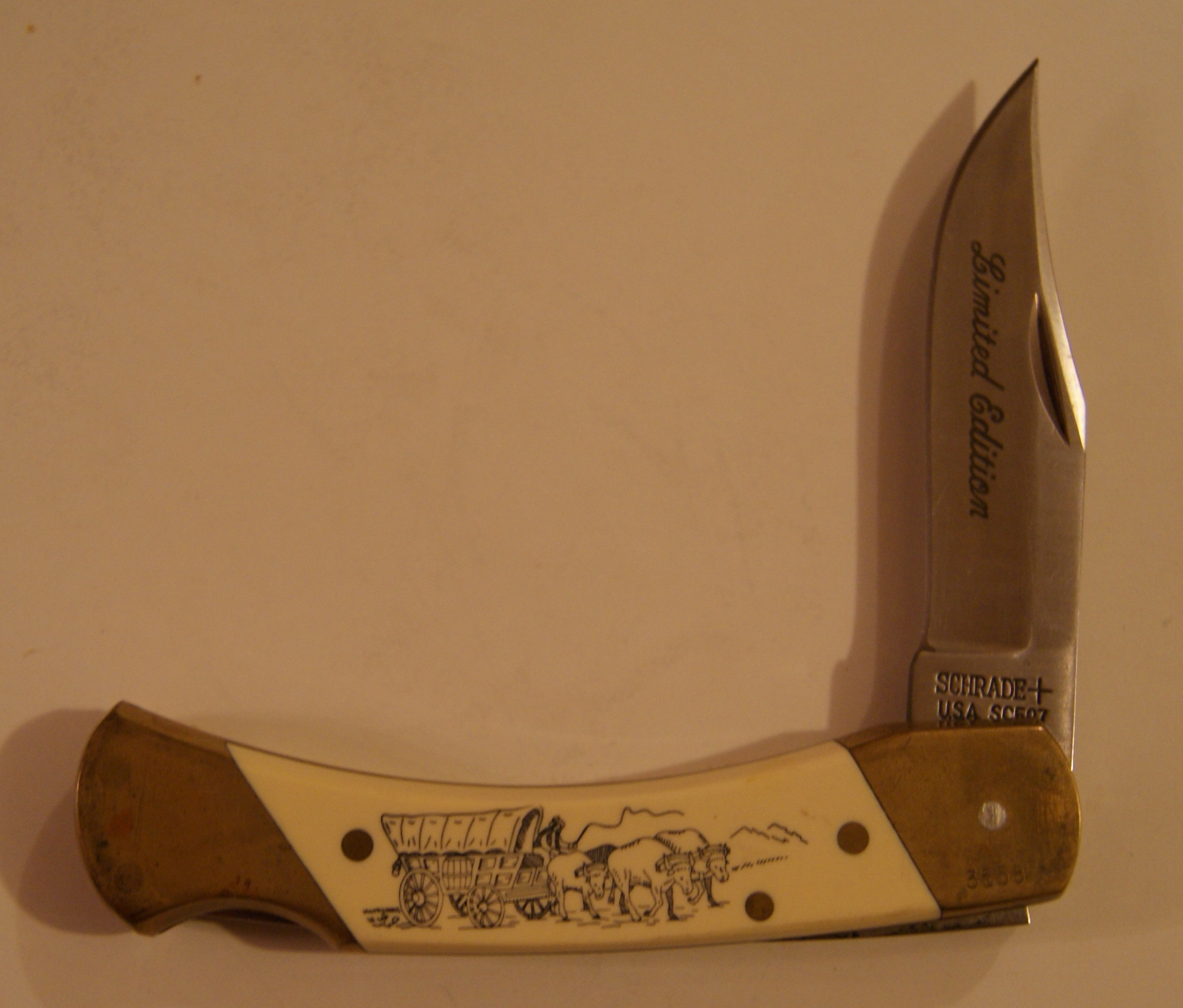
Schrade Scrimshaw Covered Wagon SC507 knife

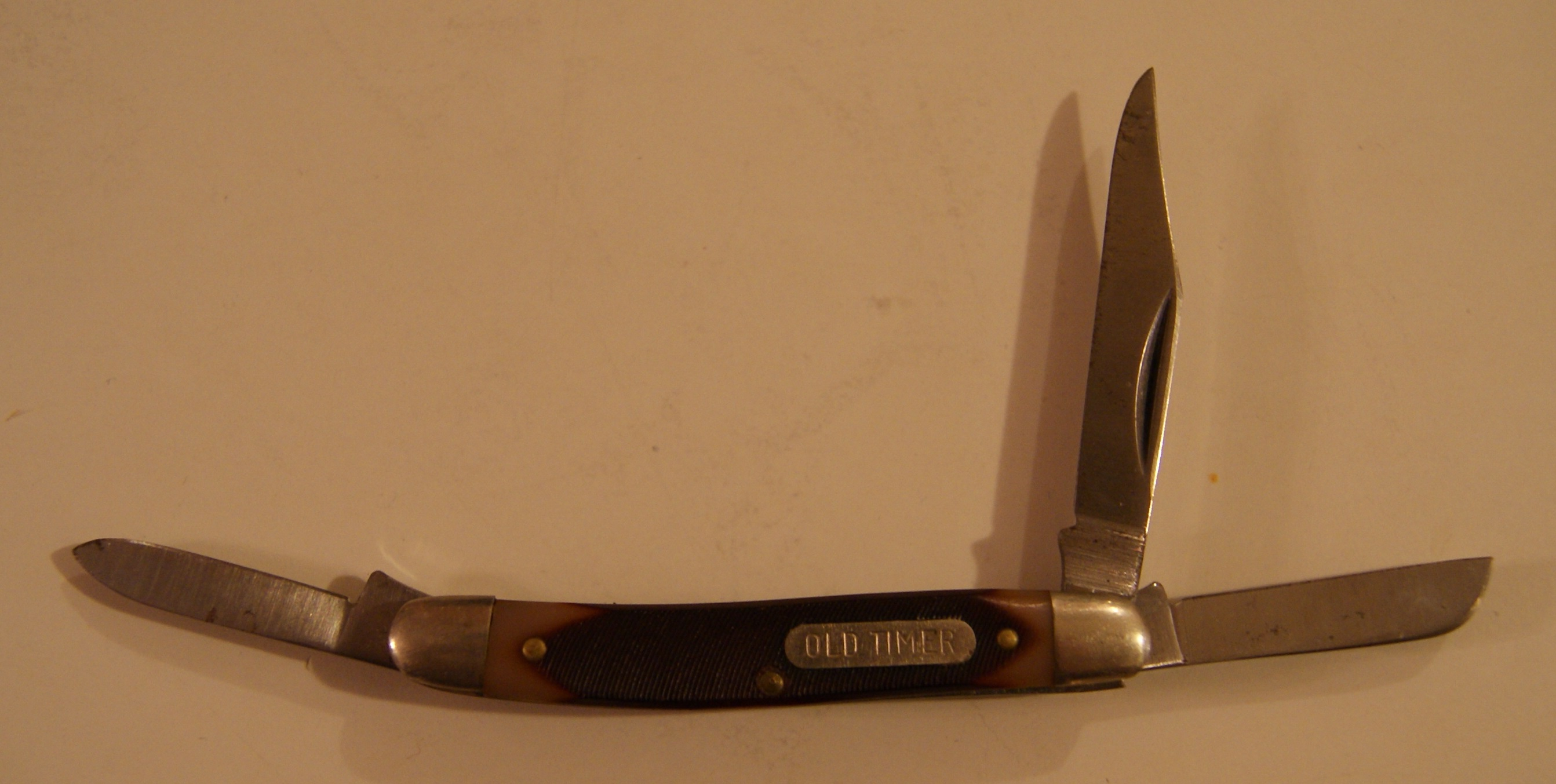
Schrade Old Timer 3-blade knife

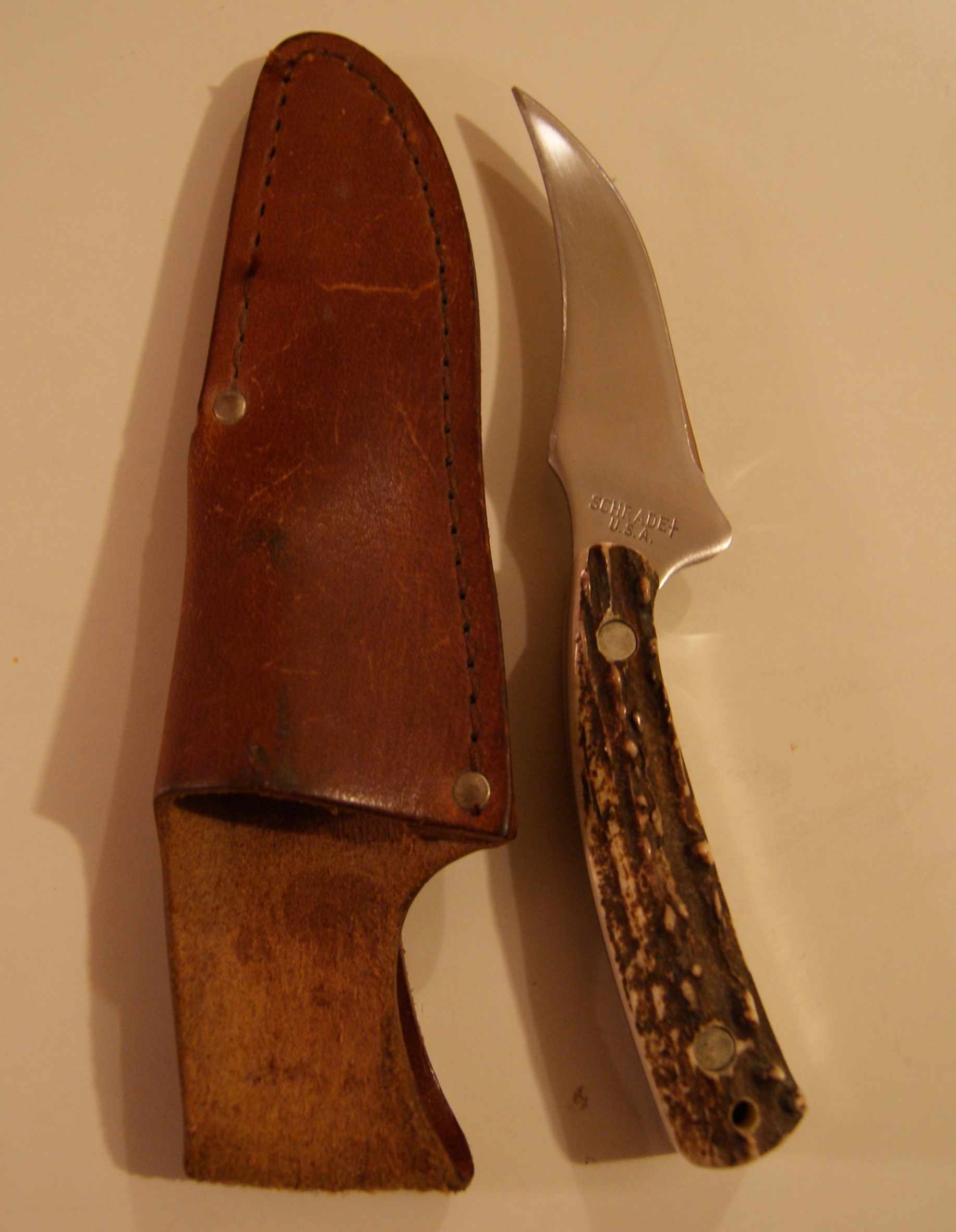
Schrade Sharpfinger skinning knife with a deer-horn handle
