= Gerber Legendary Blades =

American maker of knives, multitools, and outdoors products

Gerber Gear
- Type: Subsidiary
- Industry: Manufacturing
- Founded: 1939; 87 years ago, in Portland, Oregon, U.S.
- Headquarters: Tigard, Oregon
- Key people: Pete Gerber, Founder
- Products: Knives; Multi-tools; Tools
- Revenue: US$100 million
- Number of employees: 300
- Parent: Fiskars
- Website: www.gerbergear.com

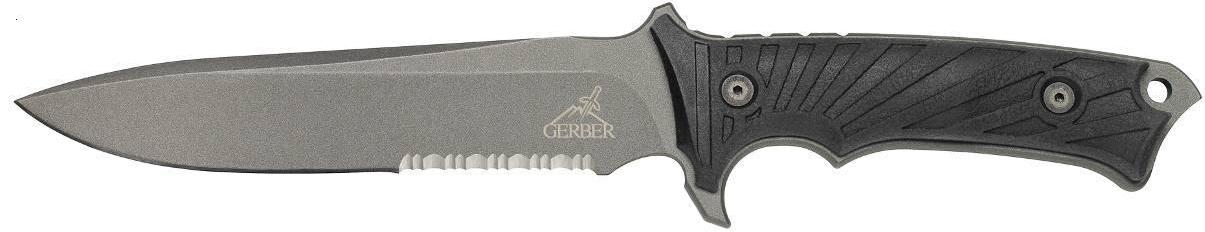
Gerber LHR Combat Knife designed by Matt Larsen, Bill Harsey and Chris Reeve

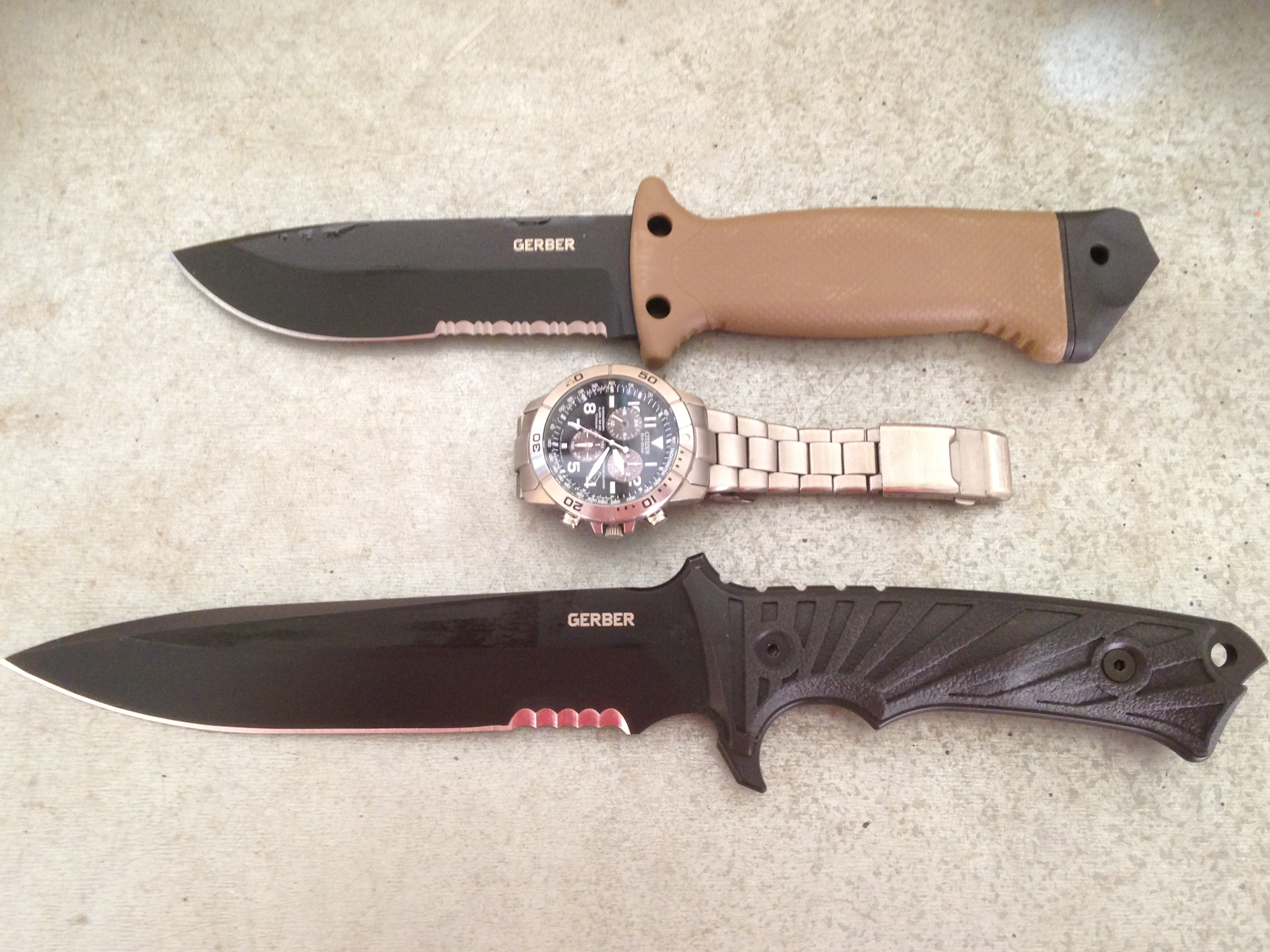
These are two of the most popular Gerber knives. The smaller is the Gerber LMF II and the larger is the Gerber LHR Sheath knife

Gerber Legendary Blades is an American maker of knives, multitools, and other tools for outdoors and military headquartered in Tigard, Oregon. The brand was established in 1939 by Pete Gerber, and is owned now by the Finnish outdoors products company Fiskars.

Gerber is the "largest maker of knives and multi-tools for the United States armed forces." The LMF II Infantry Knife, features a partial tang blade instead of a full tang blade, ostensibly to avoid electric shocks because the knife was designed to free pilots from downed aircraft.

Gerber was the first knife company to collaborate with a custom knife maker when it collaborated with World War II knife maker David Murphy.

In 2010 Bear Grylls designed a line of Gerber survival knives, including the best selling Ultimate knife. The Bear Grylls range from Gerber progressed to including items such as a water bottle, survival kit and tinder grinder.

== History ==
In 1910, the Gerber family started an advertising firm in Portland, Oregon. While working for the family business, Joseph Gerber mailed twenty-four sets of kitchen knives to clients during the holidays. These handmade knives were very popular, with then catalog retailer Abercrombie & Fitch requesting more of these knives from Gerber to sell in their catalog in 1939. Gerber started Gerber Legendary Blades that same year.

In 1966, the company relocated to new headquarters in Tigard, Oregon. Finnish company Fiskars purchased the private company in 1987.

Chad Vincent was hired as chief executive officer in July 2001. By October 2003, the company employed three hundred people, and had revenues near $100 million and was the second leading seller of multitools in the United States, after Leatherman, another company based in the Portland area.

== Designs ==
Designers who have since designed knives for Gerber include: Bob Loveless, Paul Poehlmann, Blackie Collins, William Harsey Jr., Fred Carter, Rick Hinderer, Brad Parrish, Ernest Emerson and Matt Larsen. Former Gerber employees who have started their own successful knife companies include Al Mar and Pete Kershaw. Gerber built a line of folding knives based on designs of Rex Applegate.

== Models ==
Models of Gerber fixed blade knives include:

- the Gerber Guardian: A boot knife designed by knife maker Bob Loveless more than twenty years ago.
- the Gerber Mark II: A fighting knife.
- the Gerber BMF : A survival knife.
- the Gerber LMF II Infantry
- the Gerber 31-001901 Bear Grylls Ultimate Pro
- the Gerber 22-41121 Prodigy Survival Knife
- the Gerber Blackie Collins Clip-lock Diving Knife
- the Gerber Strongarm
- the LMF II ASEK, or Aircrew Survival and Egress Knife

Models of Gerber folding knives include:

- The Bear Grylls Folding Sheath Knife
- The Flatiron, their only folding cleaver blade knife.
- The Paraframe, a lightweight pocketknife.
- The Kettlebell, a compact pocketknife.
- The Gerber/Emerson Alliance: The first automatic knife made by either company is based on the profile of Emerson Knives, Inc.'s earlier Raven knife design and is an issued item to certain military units under the NSN (NATO Stock Numbers): 5110-01-516-3243 and 5110-01-516-3244.
- the Gerber Gator: A single blade lockback knife with an ergonomic thermoplastic handle molded to resemble alligator skin.

Models of Gerber multi tools include:

- The Center-Drive, known for its automatic opening pliers and bit driver
- The Suspension Multi-Plier, a butterfly opening multi tool
- The Truss, a butterfly opening multi tool and successor to the Suspension
- The Suspension-NXT, a butterfly opening multi tool and successor to the Suspension
- The Downrange Tomahawk, a versatile tomahawk made of 420 higher carbon (HC) steel with a corrosion-resistant Cerakote finish that features as a compact multi-purpose breaching tool, with axe head with beveled edge, hammer head and integrated pry bar for various tactical and survival scenarios.

Gerber recently announced several new knives and one multi tool at the 2019 SHOT Show.

== Gallery ==
Gerber

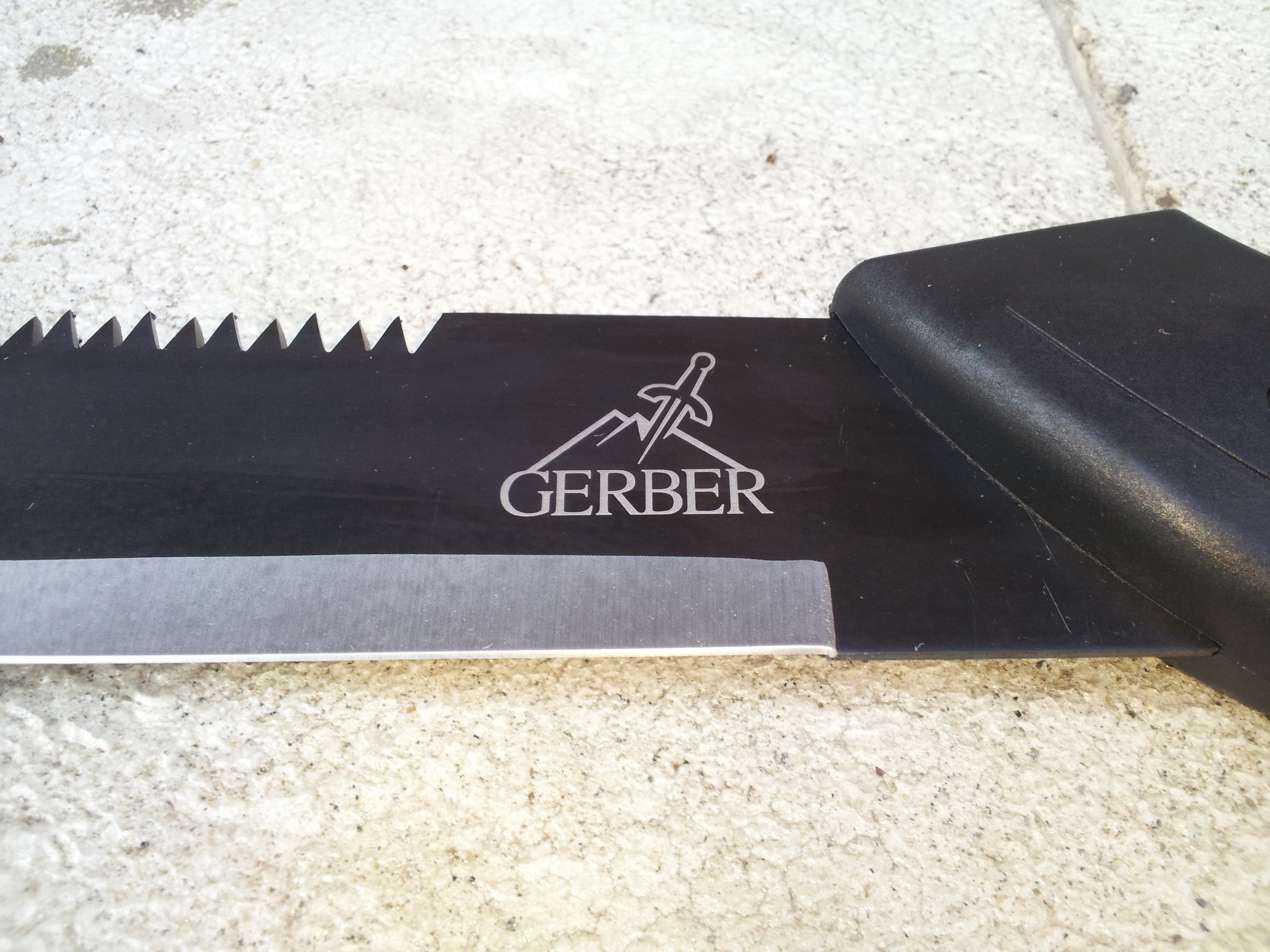
Gerber logo on machete/saw combo

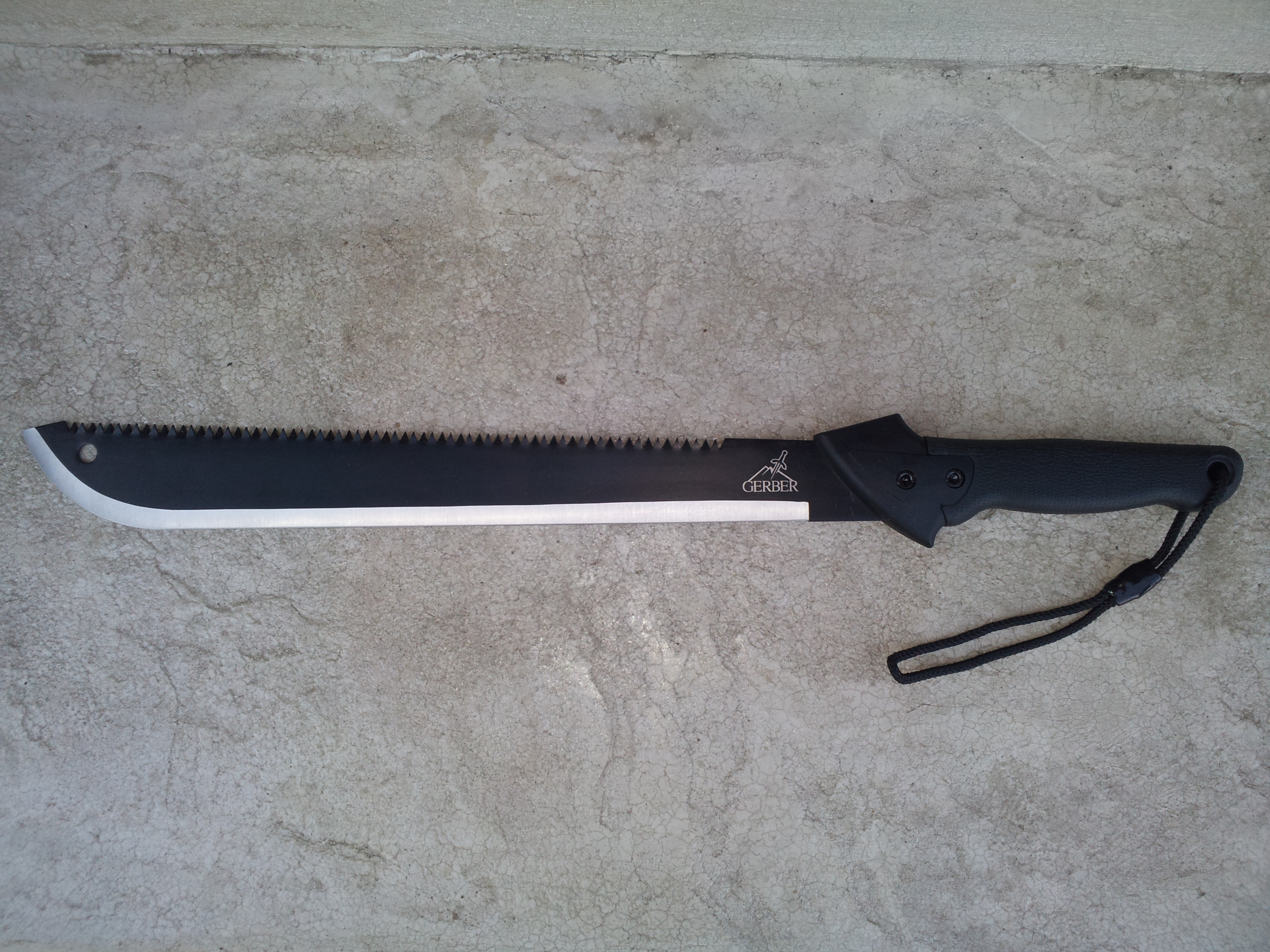
Gerber machete/saw combo

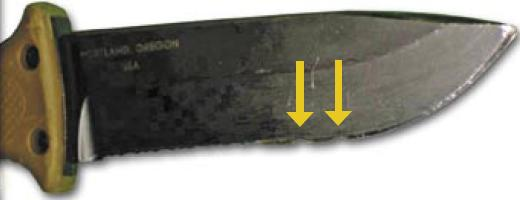
A Gerber LMF II ASEK used to cut through a 220 volt electrical line during a battle in Iraq

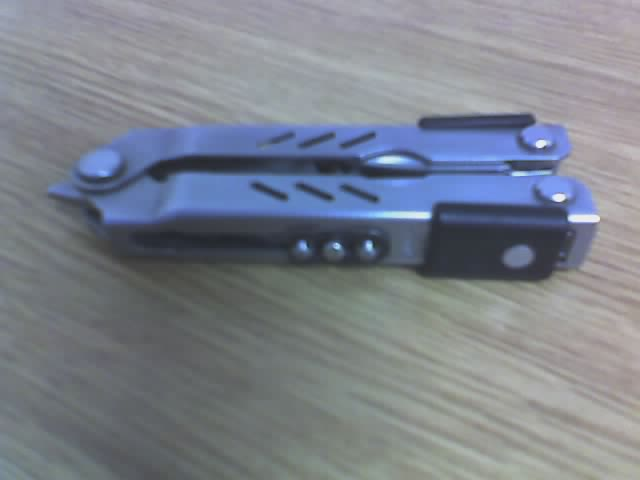
A Gerber Compact Sport 400 multitool, closed

A Gerber Compact Sport 400 multitool, open

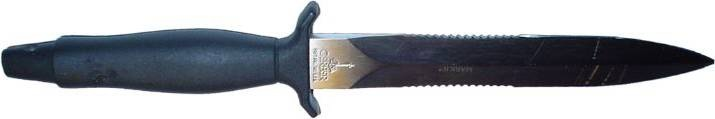
A Gerber Mark II combat knife, with black anodized blade

A blunt tip Gerber River Shorty dive knife

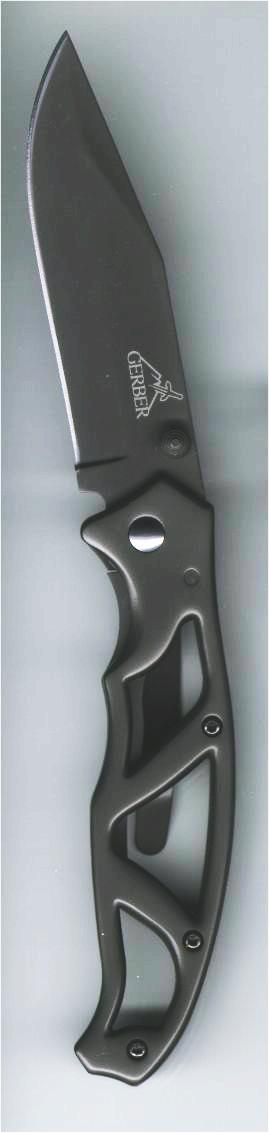
A Gerber Paraframe I framelock knife, with fine edge and dark gray titanium nitride coating.

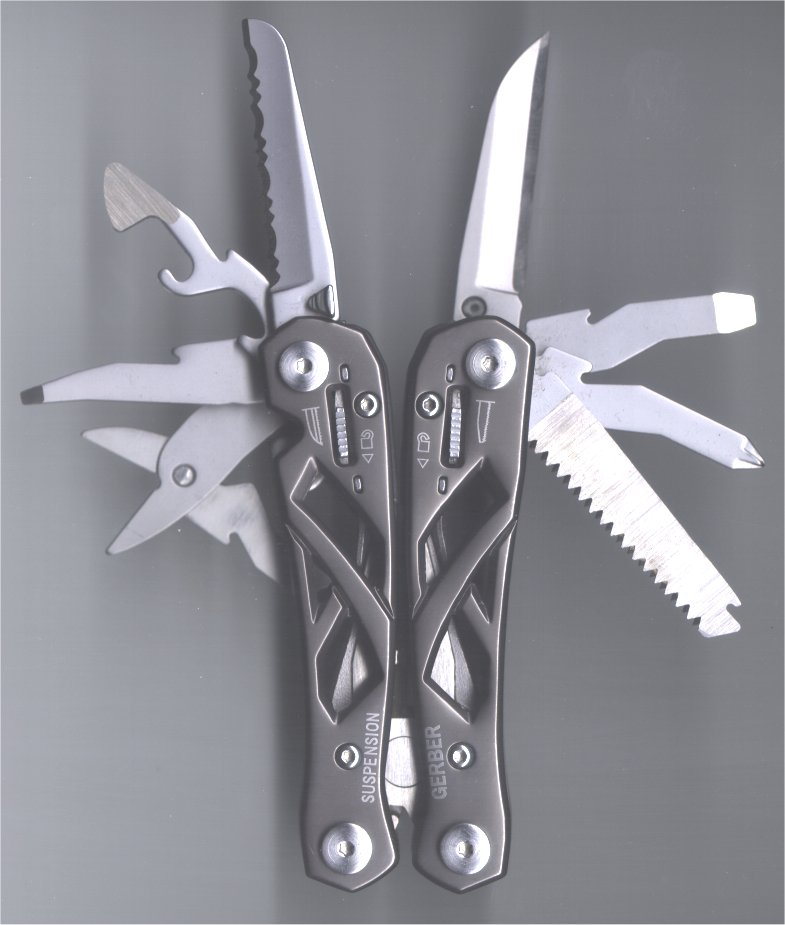
A Gerber Suspension pocket tool, blades open

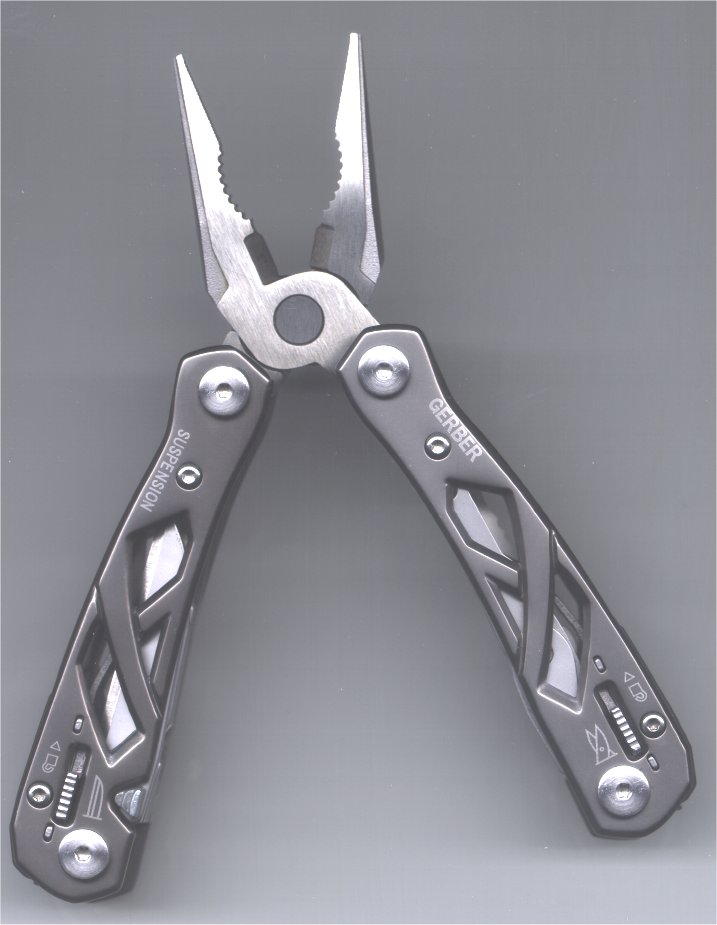
A Gerber Suspension pocket tool, pliers open

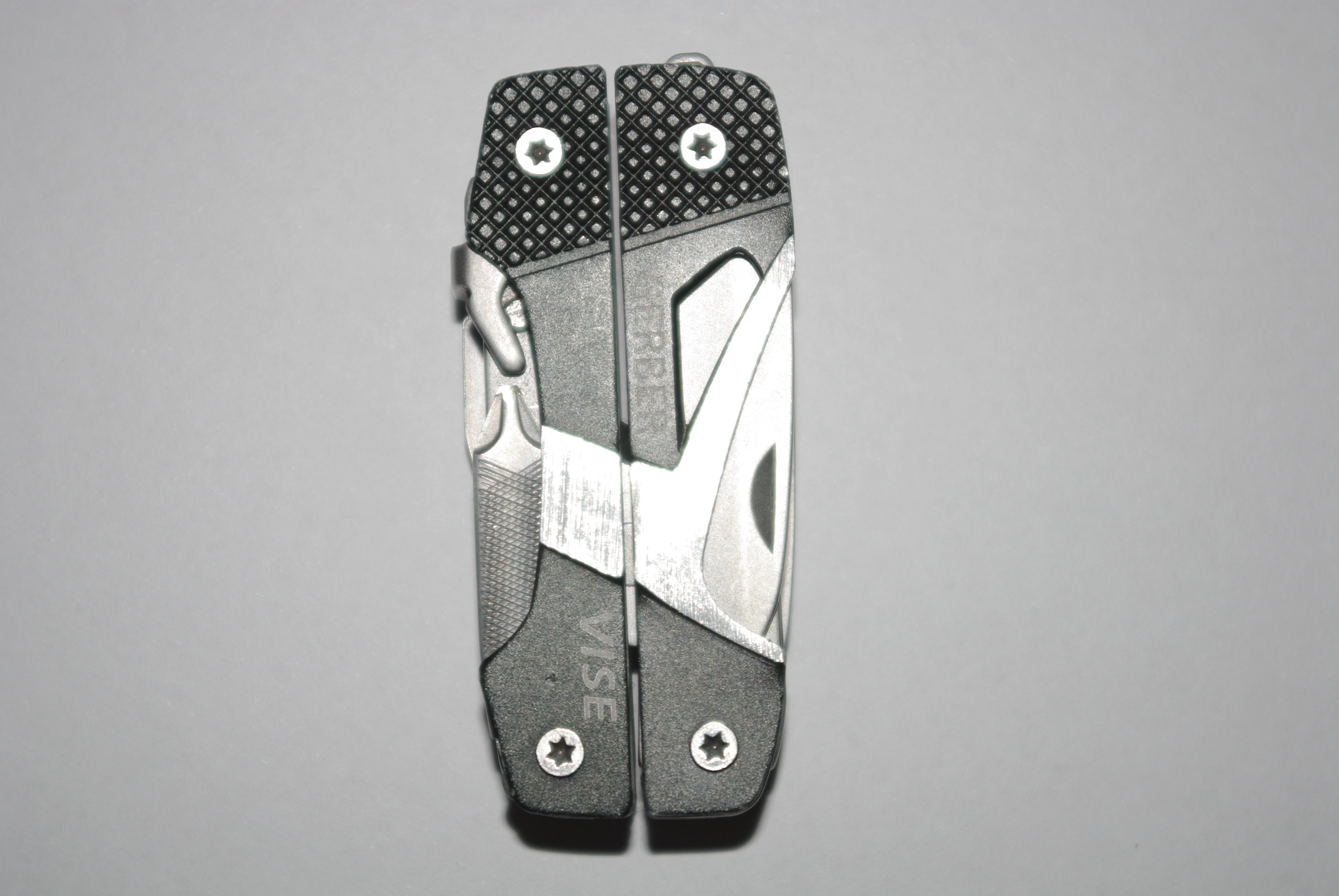
Gerber Vise keychain, 60mm long when closed

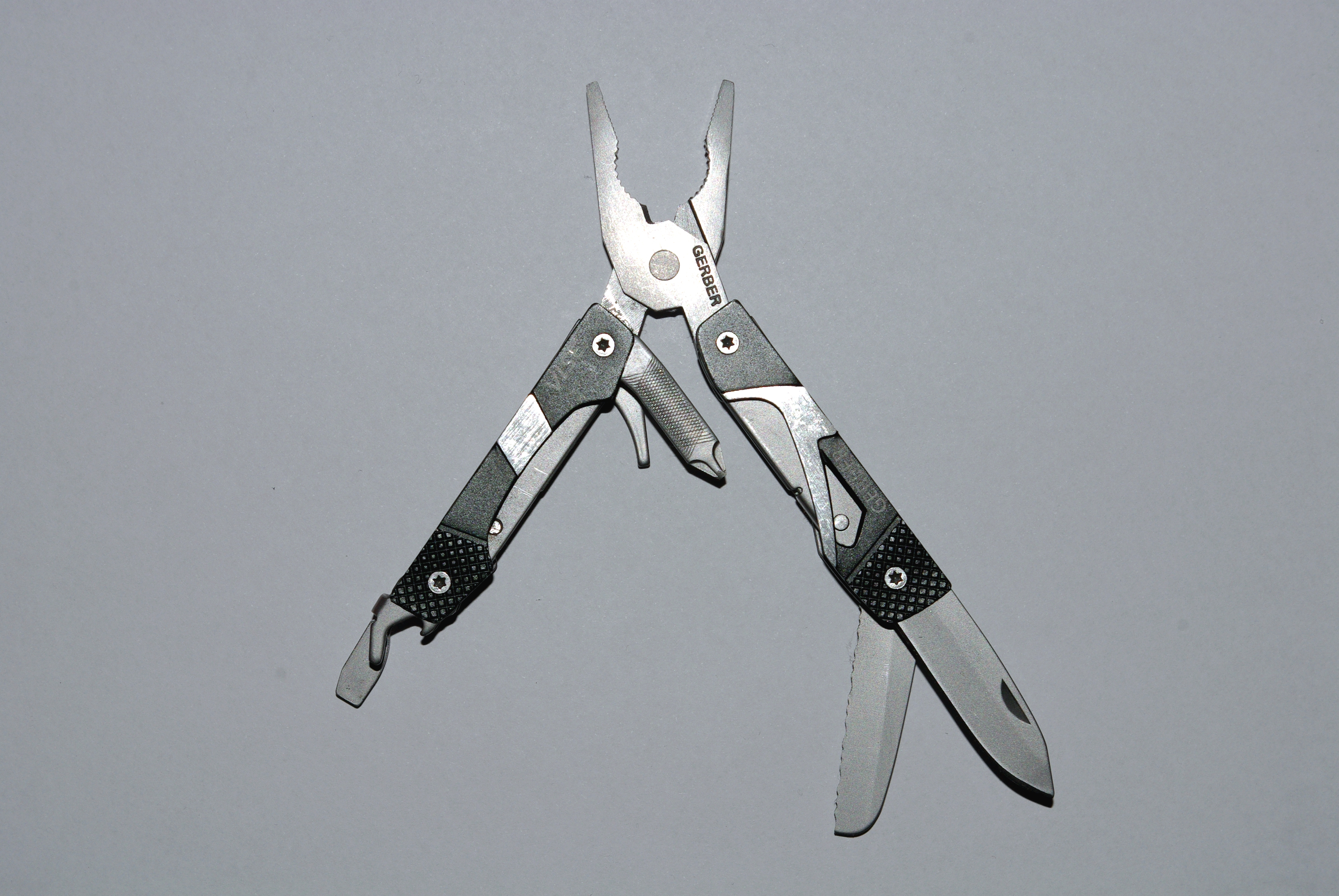
Gerber Vise, fully opened

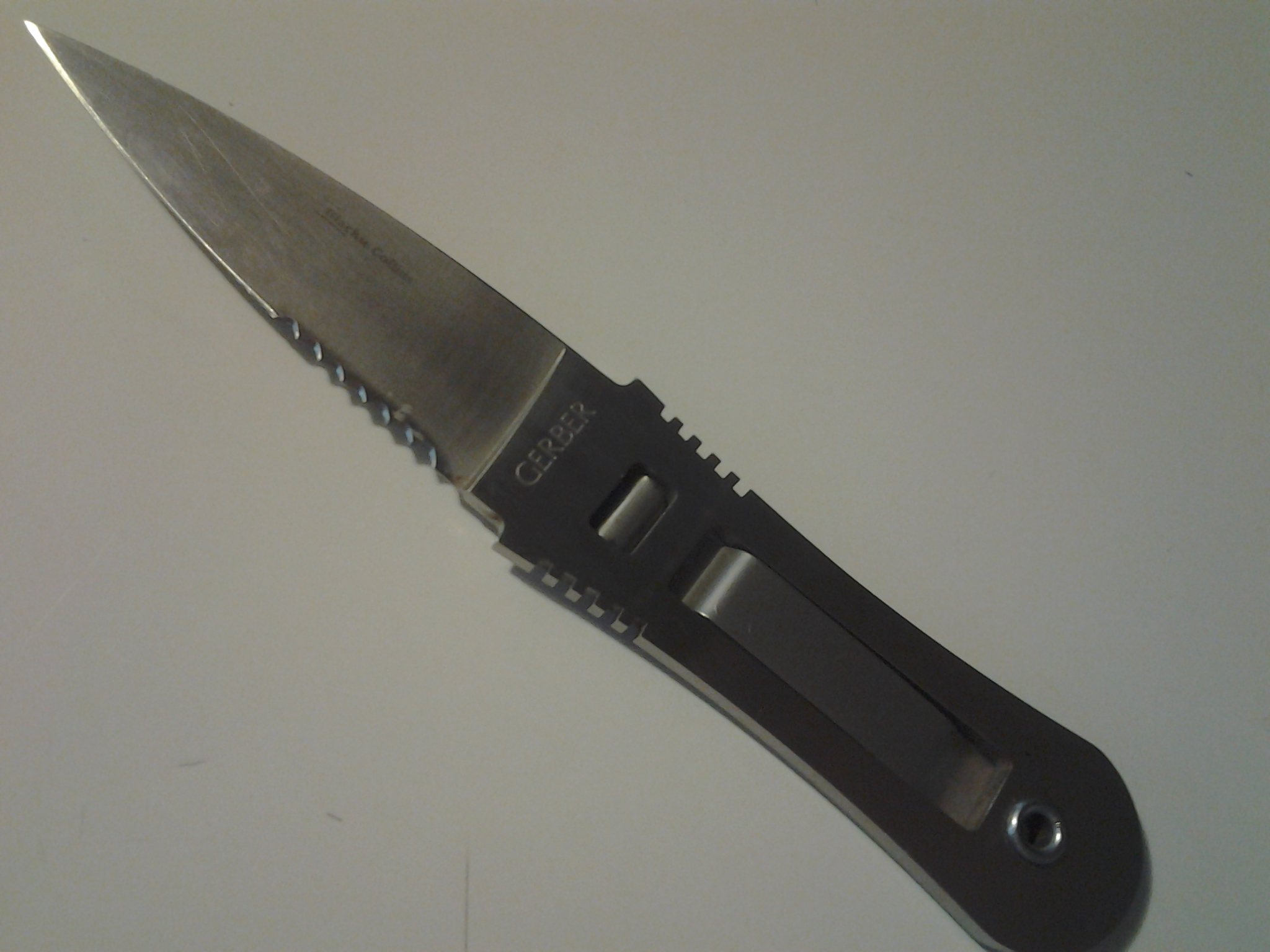
Gerber Blackie Collins One Piece, Fixed Blade Clip-Lock Diving Knife

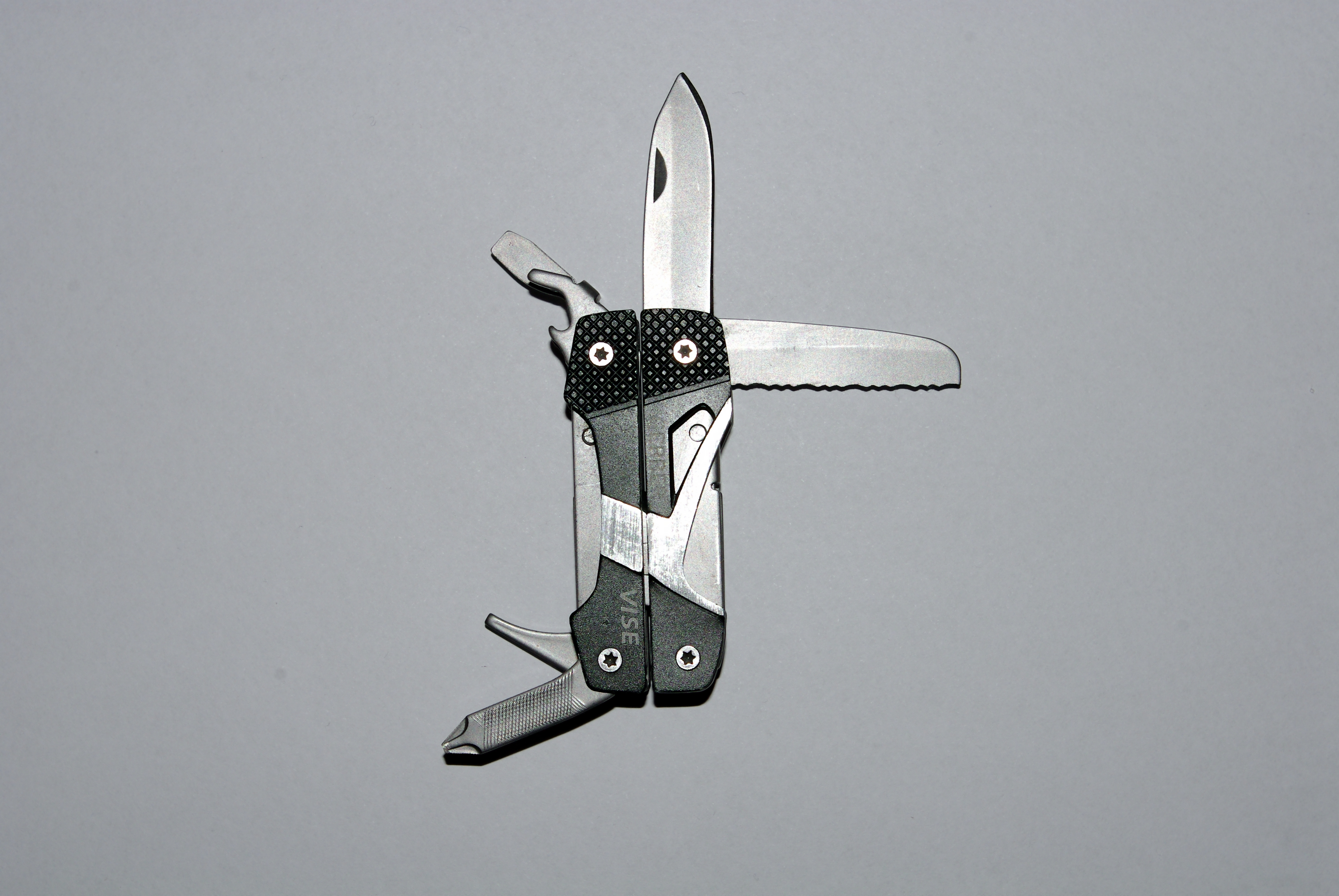
Gerber Vise, only side tools opened

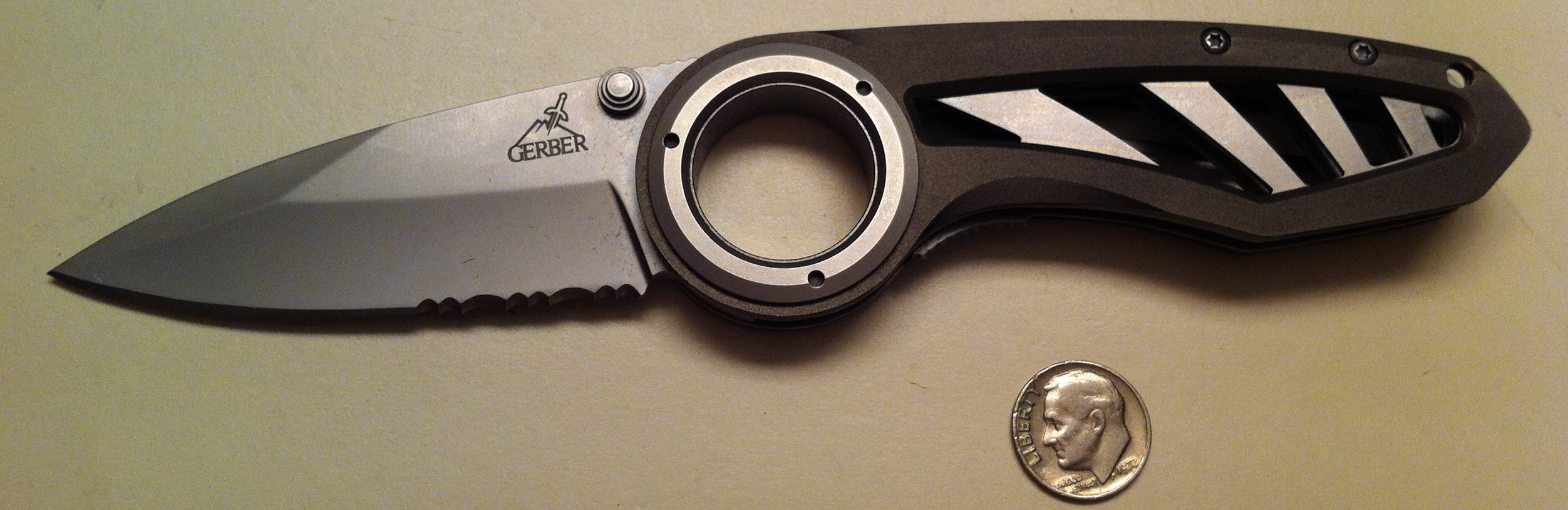
Gerber Remix, redesigned with Paraframe opening/closing system

A Gerber Assisted-opening knife

A Gerber Paraframe framelock knife, the Gerber Guardian Backup knife with sheath, and a Gerber Multi plier 600 with sheath.

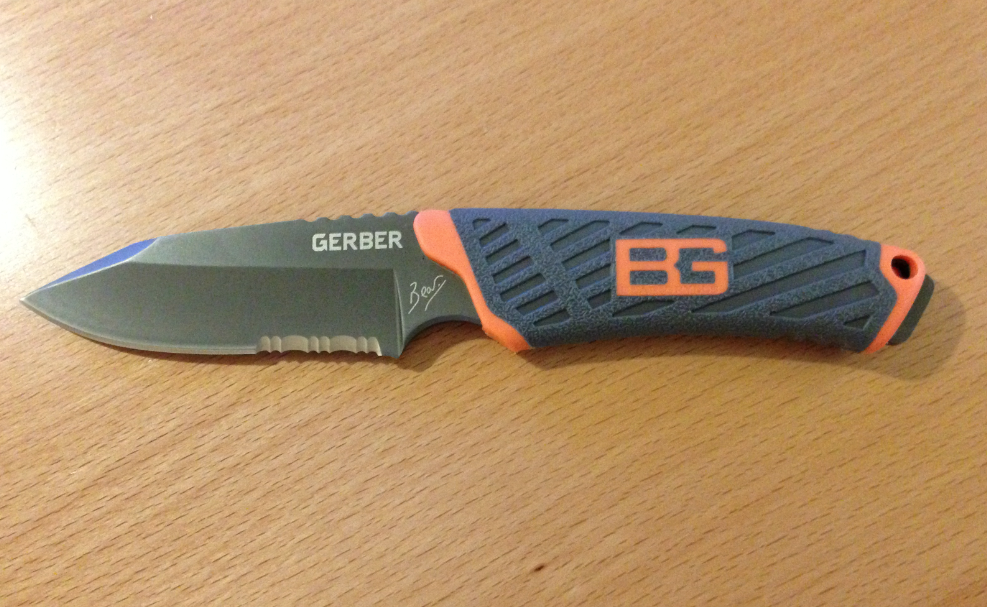
Bear Grylls compact survival knife

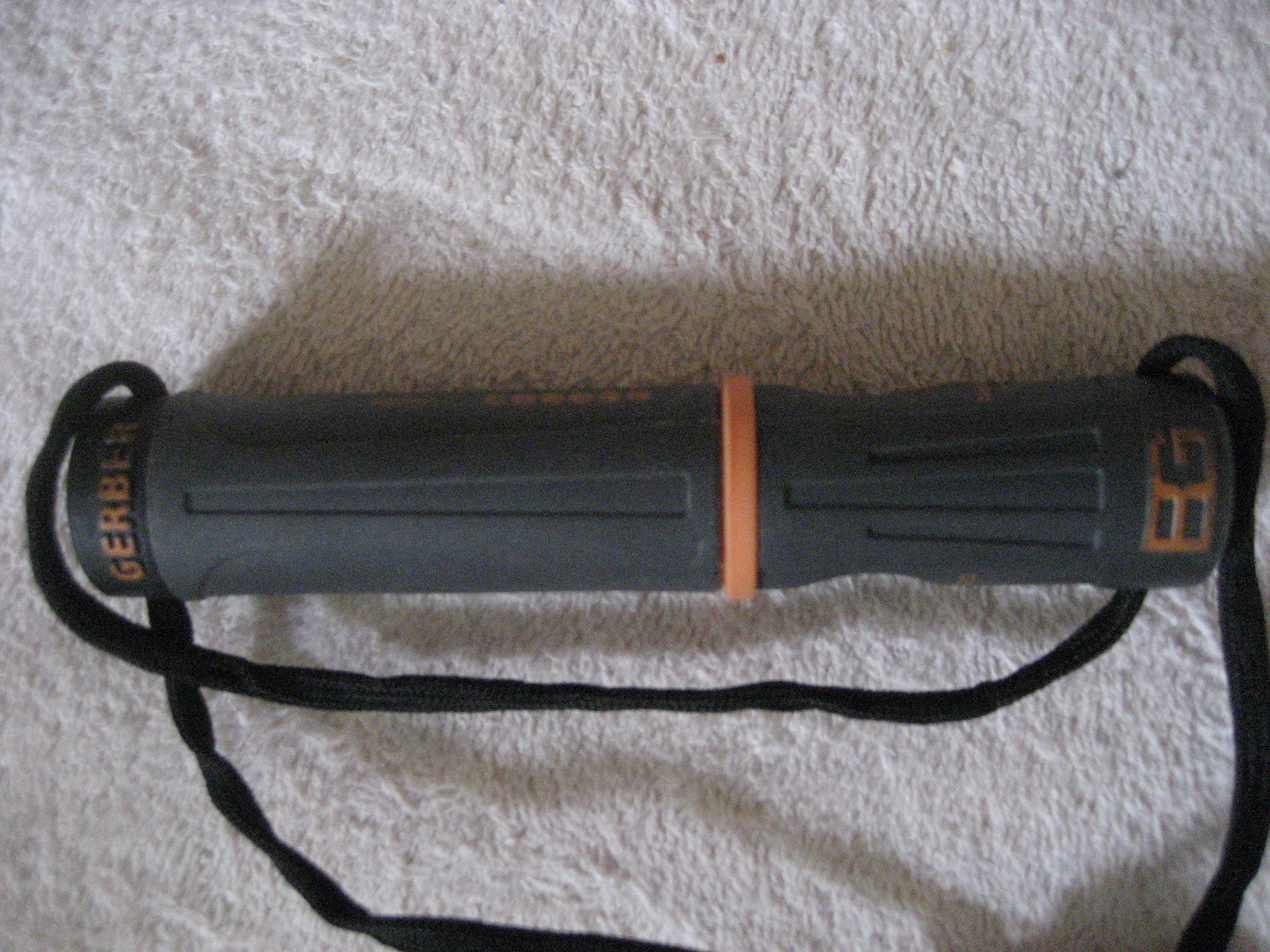
Bear Grylls series Gerber Firestarter.

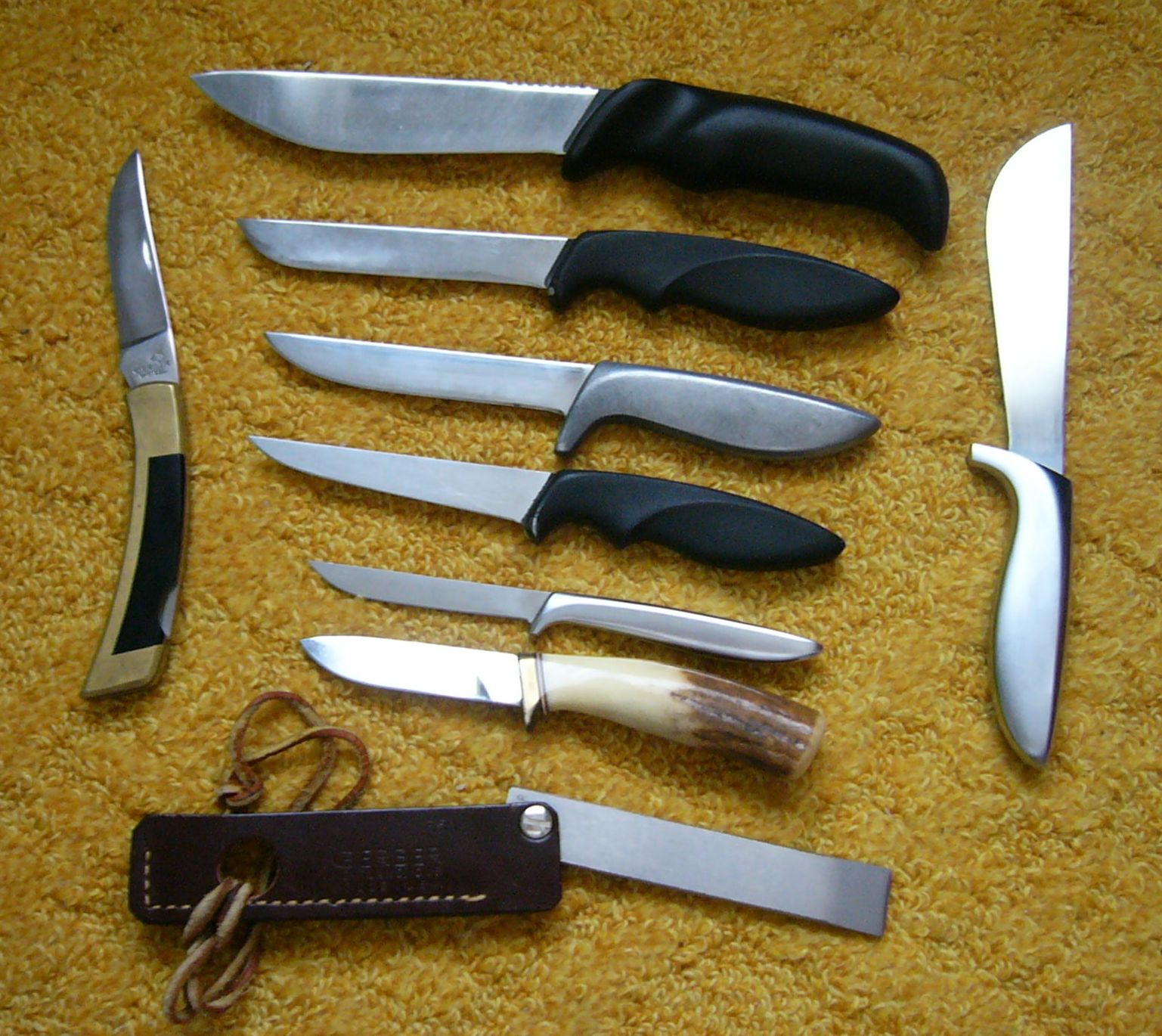
Old Gerber knives.

== See also ==
- Buck Knives
- Knife making
- List of companies based in Oregon
