= Liner lock =

Locking mechanism for folding pocket knives

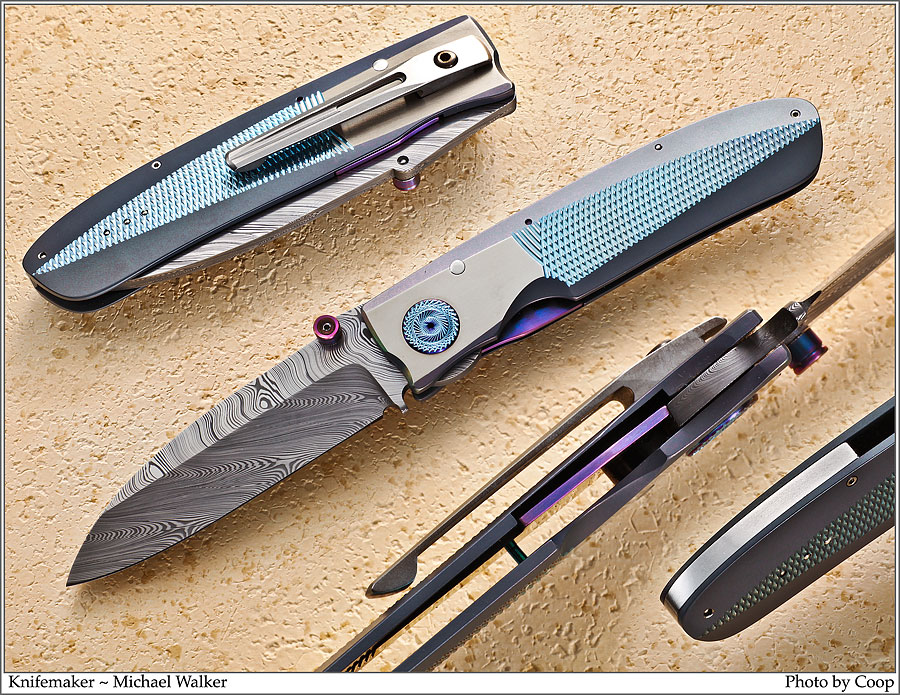
Closeup image of Linerlock mechanism created by Michael Walker, shown from several angles.

The Linerlock is a locking mechanism for folding pocket knives. A Linerlock is a folding knife with a side-spring lock that can be opened and closed with one hand without repositioning the knife in the hand. The lock is self-adjusting for wear. The modern Linerlock traces its lineage to the late 19th century, but in the 1980s the design was improved by American custom knifemaker Michael Walker.

== History ==
Linerlock knives have been around since the late 19th century. The Cattaraugus liner locking patent, 825,093 was issued on July 3, 1906. After 1923 when the patent expired, it was used by other manufacturers such as in the common military and lineman's issue two-blade electrician’s knife; the Camillus TL-29 for the locking screwdriver-stripper blade, until 2007 when the Camillus Cutlery Company went out of business.

Walker refined and popularized the design, eventually securing a trademark for the name "Linerlock" in March 1990. Walker's improvement to the design was to facilitate true one handed opening of the knife. This was accomplished by removing the weak back spring and adding a heat-treated stop pin to align the blade in the open position. Walker added a detent ball to hold the blade in the closed position using the same spring force from the liner.

== Construction ==
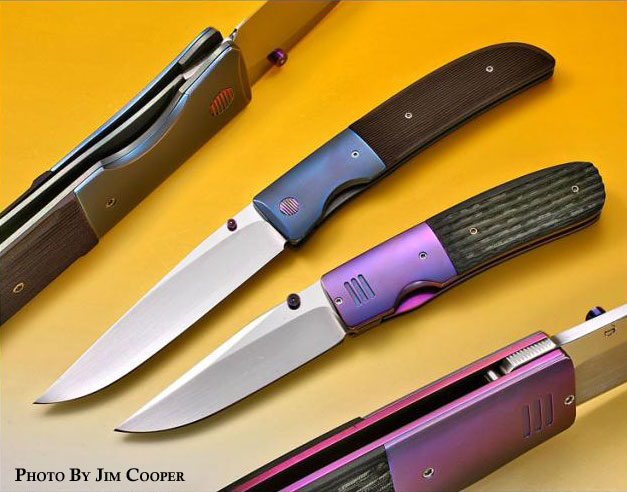
Photo of Walker Linerlock knives with closeup of locking mechanism.

Linerlock mechanisms are most commonly composed of titanium alloy or steel. The linerlock's locking side liner is split from the top toward the bottom, similar to an automotive leaf spring (also called a lock bar) that butts up against the tang of the blade to prevent the blade from closing. In an interview with Blade in 1988, Walker stated, “This long leaf-spring effect cuts down on stress on the locking mechanism". As the lock on the original electrician's knife was mostly to hold a screwdriver blade open (the knife blade, itself was secured by a slip joint method), Walker's refinements prevented the knife blade from closing on the user's hand and converted it into a true lock.

To release the lock, the user presses the lock bar back toward the handle side, at which time the blade is free to close. In the closed position the lock bar (leaf spring) rests alongside the handle and the blade.

== Variations ==
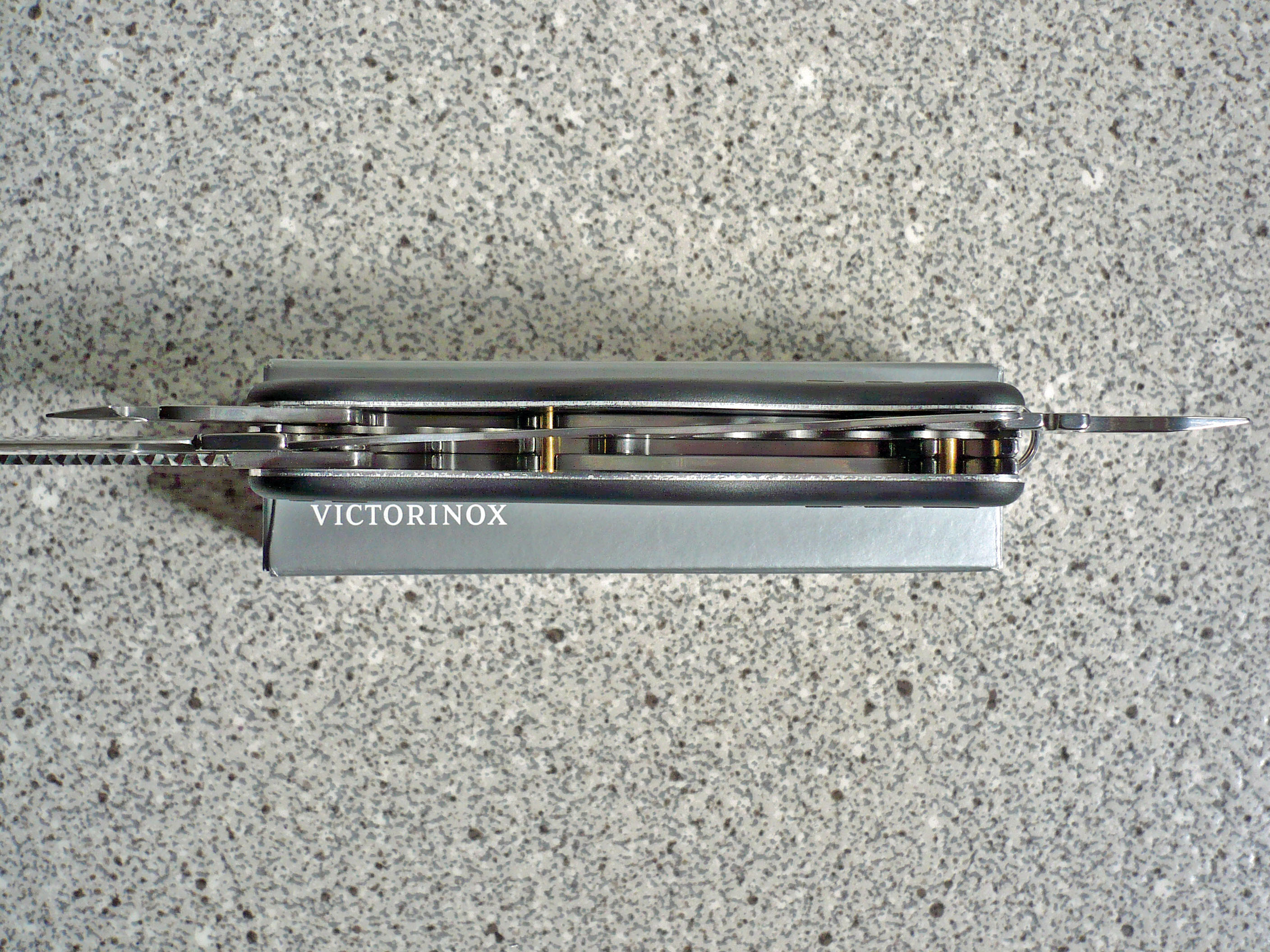
Dual liner lock system as used in the Soldatenmesser 08 and various other Victorinox 111 mm models. The engaged leaf springs feature a series of holes to reduce their weight.

There are a number of other variations on the Linerlock or locking liner, depending on the knife manufacturer. One example would be the frame lock, sometimes called the Reeve Integral Lock and used on the Sebenza. With the "frame lock," the frame rather than the liner acts like the leaf spring/lock bar. Another variation, known as the inset Linerlock has the leaf spring embedded into the plastic scales of the handle, technically forgoing a metal liner. Kershaw Knives uses "a pin-and-dimple lock" on a knife designed by custom knifemaker RJ Martin called the "Nerve" to keep the blade closed.

Some of the many knife makers and knife manufacturing companies that utilize the Linerlock, in alphabetical order, include:

- Benchmade
- Buck Knives
- Cold Steel
- Ernest Emerson
- Fällkniven
- Gerber Knives
- Ken Onion
- Leatherman
- Michael Walker
- Mike Snody
- Microtech Knives
- Robert Terzuola
- Spyderco
- Strider Knives
- Victorinox

== See also ==
- LAWKS
- Michael Walker (knifemaker)
- Knives
- Pocket knives
