= VG1 =

VG1 or variant may refer to:

- Vg1 ribozyme, an RNA-based non-protein-based enzyme
- Volkssturmgewehr VG 1, a WWII German gun
- 1969 VG1, a main belt asteroid discovered in 1969, named Kursk, the 3073rd asteroid registered
- (5371) 1987 VG1, a main belt asteroid discovered in 1987, the 5371st asteroid registered

== See also ==
- VG-1 (disambiguation)
- VGL (disambiguation)
- VGI (disambiguation)
- VG (disambiguation)
