= Michael Walker (knifemaker) =

American knife maker

Michael Leon Walker
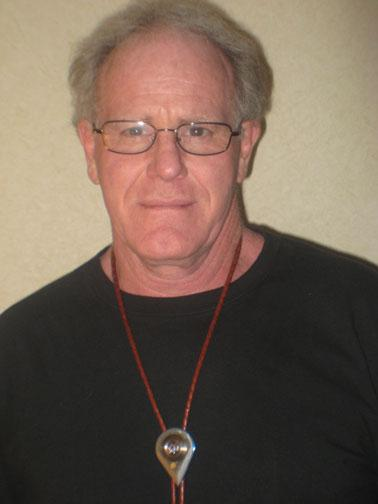
- Michael Walker, Knifemaker and Inventor
- Born: 1949 (age 76–77)
- Known for: Knifemaker, bladesmith, sculptor
- Awards: Blade Cutlery Hall of Fame
- Website: artifexgallery.com/michaelknives.html

Michael Leon Walker is an American custom knifemaker and sculptor based in Taos, New Mexico. Walker is the inventor of more than 20 different knife mechanisms including the Walker Linerlock for which he secured a trademark in 1980.

== Early life ==
Walker began his career as a jeweler, until 1975 when his wife, Patricia Walker, gave him a Gerber knife and a copy of American Blade magazine. Walker noted similarities between his jewelry and custom art knives and decided he would try his hand at knifemaking.

== Knife making ==
Walker began making knives full-time in 1980 with fixed-blade art knives. When a customer asked him to make sheaths for these knives, Walker found the task more labor-intensive and less enjoyable than making the knives. As a result, he decided from then on to make folding knives which would not require a sheath, which led to his development of the Walker Linerlock.

In 1981, Walker began a limited partnership with knifemaker Ron Lake. The two makers have collaborated on numerous designs including the LAWKS. In 1985, Walker became a voting member of the Knifemakers' Guild.

In 2004, Walker was inducted into the Blade magazine's Cutlery Hall of Fame.

== Inventions ==
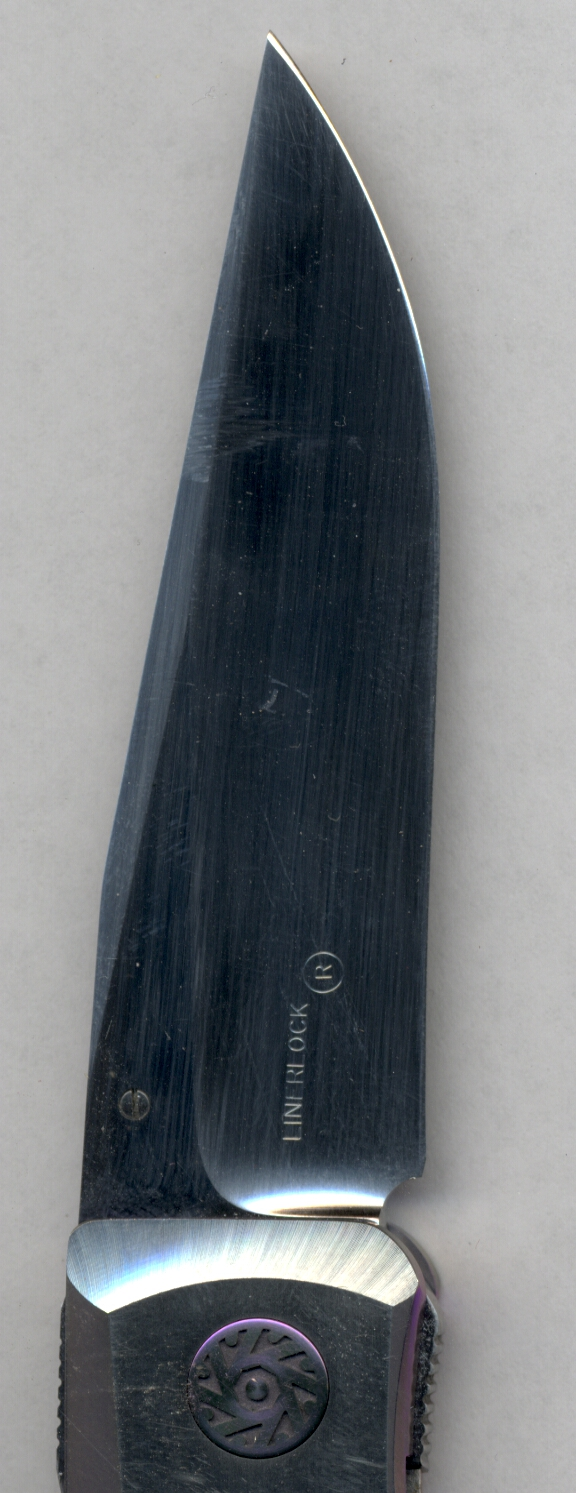
Closeup image of Linerlock (TM)

Walker has patented or trademarked more than 20 different mechanisms related to locks and composite cutting blades on pocketknives.

Most notably, Walker is known for the invention of the Walker Linerlock in 1981, which has since become the industry standard in folding knife mechanisms. What sets Walker's design apart is a long split in one of the liners which acts as a leaf-spring in the liner of the knife accompanied. This feature cuts down on mechanical stress. An additional feature of the Linerlock is the addition of a ball detent. This additional feature eliminates rubbing and scratch-marks when the knife is opened and closed.

Other inventions include the "Lake and Walker Safety System" or LAWKS, BLADELock, Linerlock, Ball bearing lock, and Tough Lock.

Some of the production companies he has partnered with include Spyderco, Columbia River Knife and Tool, Schrade, Böker, and Klotzli.

Walker's knives and designs have inspired many other custom knifemakers, notably Bob Terzuola and Ernest Emerson. Terzuola credits Walker with teaching him how to make a linerlock folder and Emerson has said that seeing a Walker knife at a gun show gave him the inspiration to become a custom knifemaker.

Walker's knives can be found at Artifex Gallery in Taos, and in galleries and shows around the world.
