= LAWKS =

Folding knife mechanism

The Lake and Walker Knife Safety system (LAWKS) is a patented addition to folding knives using the Walker Linerlock, designed by noted Knifemakers' Guild members Ron Lake and Michael Walker. The safety comes in two versions: original LAWKS and the Columbia River Knife & Tool company's patented AutoLAWKS. These additions raise manufacturing and engineering costs, but increase safety and security.

== Operation ==
The original LAWKS mechanism consists of a switch on the handle of the knife, connected to the liner lock. When pulled back, the liner lock can easily be pushed back to close the knife. But when the safety switch is pushed forward, it acts as an extra lock ensuring the linerlock can not be used to close the knife, making the folding knife a virtual fixed-blade tool.

The AutoLAWKS mechanism was designed after professional military/law enforcement consultants pointed out that sudden tactical or immediate operation situations would call for focus on something other than actuating a safety switch under duress. The AutoLAWKS automatically activates, as the knife is opened. To close the blade again, the user has to pull the switch back to free the liner lock like the original LAWKS, but the AutoLAWKS switch automatically returns to a neutral position.
