= Edge of Belgravia =

- Type: Private limited company
- Industry: Kitchenware
- Founded: 2010
- Headquarters: Belgravia, London, United Kingdom
- Area served: Worldwide
- Products: Chef knives, knife blocks
- Website: www.edgeofbelgravia.co.uk

Edge of Belgravia is an English manufacturer of chef knives and knife blocks. It was founded in London in 2010.

== Products ==
Edge of Belgravia produces knives in the following series:

- Tasekiso, formerly known as Damascus (introduced in 2011). Tasekiso blades consist of 67 layers of Japanese high-carbon steel based around a VG-10 core.
- Ceramic Onyx (introduced in 2011). Edge of Belgravia's ceramic blades are manufactured from sintered zirconium oxide, mixed with cobalt. These knives have a black rubber handle.
- Ceramic Lime (introduced in 2011). These knives have a lime green rubber handle, with the same ceramic blades as used in the Ceramic Onyx series.
- Precision (introduced in 2014). These knives have stainless steel blades with non-stick coatings made by ILAG, and rubber handles.

Edge of Belgravia also produces the following knife block:

- Black Diamond, manufactured from injection-moulded plastic with a TRP coating.
