= VGI =

VGI may refer to:

- Volunteered geographic information
- VGI Global Media, an advertising firm
- Virgin Atlantic International (ICAO airline code: VGI), see List of airlines of the United Kingdom
- Vangani railway station (rail code: VGI), see List of railway stations in India
- VGI, a strain of Cryptococcus
- Voltage-Gated Inactivation, of voltage-gated calcium channel
- Vehicle-Grid Interface, for vehicle-to-grid
- Video Games Indonesia, a gaming community in Indonesia, see video games in Indonesia
- "V.G.I.", a 1997 song by Kathleen Hanna from the album Julie Ruin

== See also ==
- VGL (disambiguation)
- VG1 (disambiguation)
- VG (disambiguation)
