= VGL =

VGL may refer to:

- Video Games Live, a concert series
- Vaibhav Global Limited, a retail, wholesale and manufacturing company
- VirtualGL, software to redirect 3D rendering for Unix and Linux OpenGL applications

== See also ==
- VG1 (disambiguation)
- VGI (disambiguation)
