= Assisted-opening knife =

Type of folding knife

An assisted-opening knife being opened.

An assisted-opening knife is a type of folding knife which uses an internal mechanism to finish the opening of the blade once the user has partially opened it using a flipper or thumbstud attached to the blade.

When the knife is in the closed position, the blade is held in place by means of torsion springs and an additional blade lock (optional). As the user applies manual pressure to the thumbstud to open the knife, a mechanism such as a torsion spring moves along a track in the liner and rapidly rotates the blade into the open and locked position.

== Legality ==
=== United States ===
Although commonly confused with switchblade knives, a switchblade can be opened automatically simply with the push of a button, but the user of an assisted-opening knife must open it about one-quarter of the way (45°) before the mechanism opens the knife the rest of the way. The difference is important legally; because the blade does not open simply "by the push of a button or by force of gravity" the assisted-opening knife is typically not considered a switchblade, and may escape the restrictions applying to those in many places. Despite this, there are cases on record of persons in possession of assisted-opening knives who have been arrested for possessing a 'switchblade knife' prohibited under state laws. In 2018, New York's highest court sustained a criminal conviction for possession of a switchblade against a defendant found in possession of an assisted-opening knife.

=== United Kingdom ===
In 2019, the Offensive Weapons Act prohibiting automatic flick knives was amended to prohibit: “(a)any knife which has a blade which opens automatically—(i)from the closed position to the fully opened position, or (ii)from a partially opened position to the fully opened position, by manual pressure applied to a button, spring or other device in or attached to the knife, and which is sometimes known as a “flick knife” or “flick gun”..”. According to the official United Kingdom website on the selling, buying, and carrying of knives, assisted-opening knives are included in the newly amended, expanded definition of a prohibited flick knife.

== Trade names ==
Trade names for assisted-opening knives are: Forward Action Spring Technology, A/O Knife, Torsion Assist Knife, Assisted Knife, Spring Assist Knife, Spring Assisted Knife, Quick Release, Quick Draw, Alternative Automatic, Outburst, SpeedSafe, Blade Launcher, S.A.T (SOG Assisted Technology), and the Semi-Auto.

== History ==
The first assisted opening knife was designed by Blackie Collins in 1995 and was named the "Strut-and-Cut"; it was based on the strut of his Ducati motorcycle. A similar concept was developed three years later by knifemaker Ken Onion with Onion's idea based on a similar mechanism in his Harley Davidson motorcycle. Onion applied for a patent on his design in 1998.
