= VG-1 (steel) =

VG-1 (also known as V Gold 1 steel) is a high Carbon (C) Molybdenum (Mo) stainless steel manufactured by Takefu Special Steel Co., Ltd. It is not the same steel as VG-10.

VG-1 has a Carbon (C) content between 0.95–1.05 %, Chromium (Cr) content between 13.0–15.0 %, Molybdenum (Mo) content between 0.2–0.4 % and contains less than 0.25% of Nickel (Ni). During forging, Mo and Cr form hard double carbide bonds, which help improve the abrasion and corrosion resistance of the steel. It is usually heat treated to reach hardness of HRC 58–61.

Knife retailer Cold Steel markets a variety of knives that use VG-1. Cold Steel claims that VG-1 has better sharpness, edge retention, point strength, shock and strength characteristics than 440C, VG-10, or ATS 34 stainless steels, though any of those alloys may be better than VG-1 in individual categories. There have been reports that VG-1 might be more chipping prone than other comparable stainless steels, but these reports have been disputed.

VG-1 is also used in hairdresser's scissors, kitchen knives and blades for food-processing machines.
