= Fällkniven =

Knife manufacturer based in Sweden

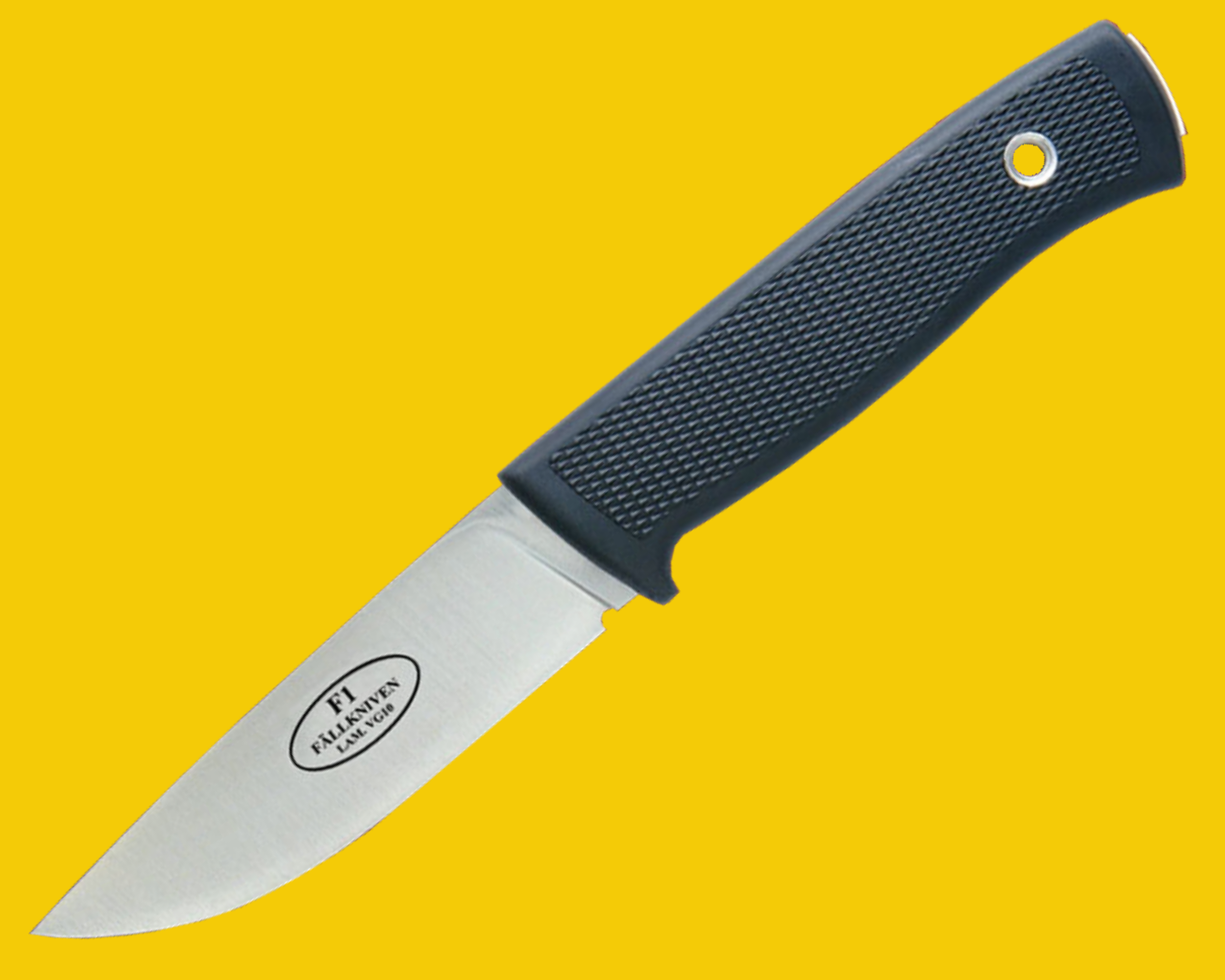
The Fällkniven F1

Fällkniven AB Swedish pronunciation: [ˈfɛlːkniːvɛn] is a Sweden-based manufacturer of knives and knife-related gear and apparel. Fällkniven was founded in 1984 in Boden by Peter Hjortberger. The company started importing knives and, in 1987, began designing knives. In 2009 Eric Hjortberger, the founder's son, took over as president of Fällkniven AB.

== Products ==
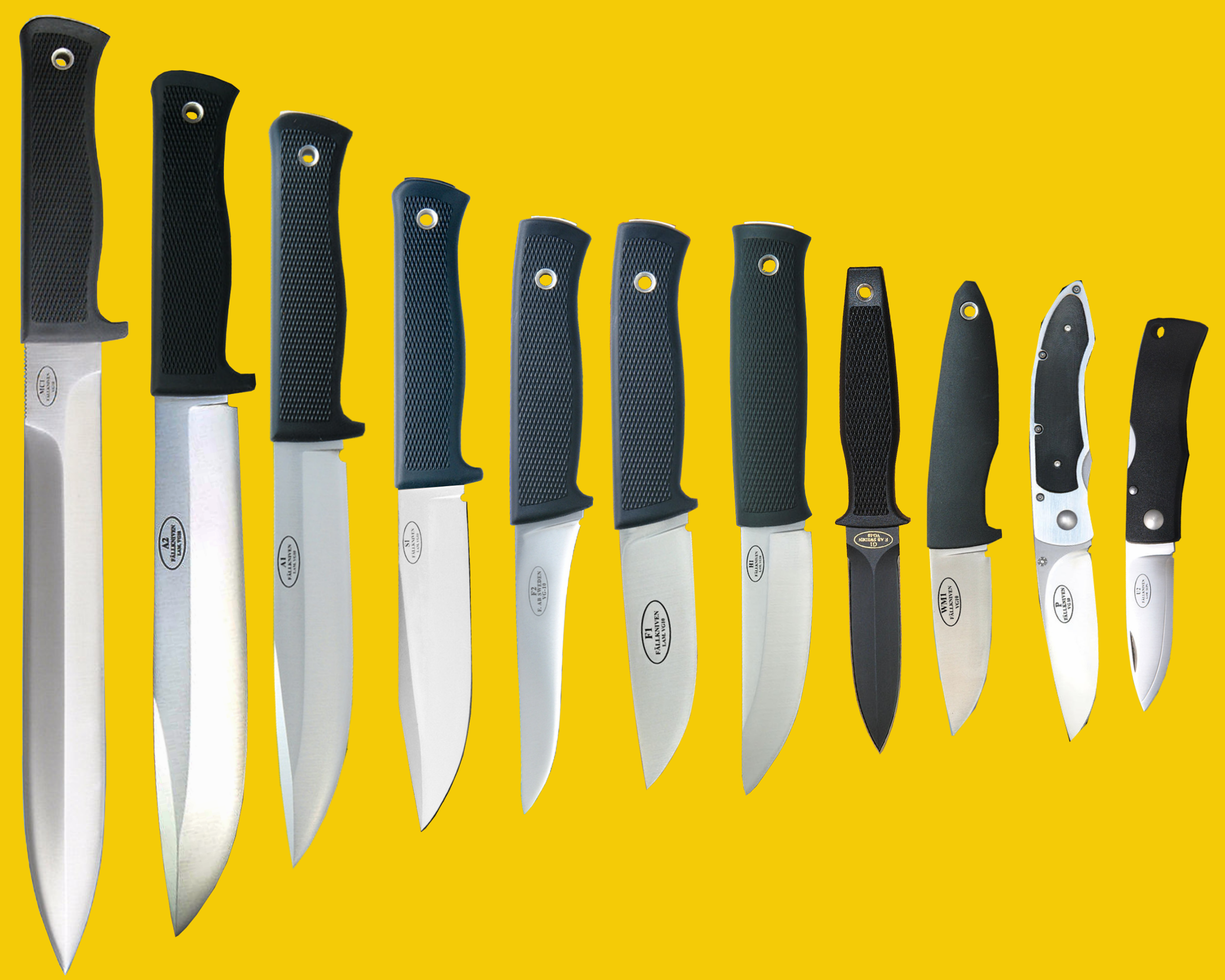
Fällkniven basic line-up

Fällkniven is best known as a supplier of military and outdoor knives, supplying the Swedish military. The Fällkniven model F1 has been the official survival knife for pilots in the Swedish Air Force since 1995. Models F1 and S1 are approved for U.S. Navy and U.S. Marine air crews. Fällkniven also produces outdoors-, hunting- and kitchen knives such as the "Hunting Knife", the "Fällkniven H1".

=== Manufacturing ===
Fällkniven is a Swedish company, but most if not all of its production is done by subcontractors. Early F1 knives made of ATS34 steel were manufactured in Germany by Linder-Solingen. Production has been moved to Seki Japan since Fällkniven replaced ATS34 steel with VG-10 and 3G (SPGS-powder steel) core laminates, in its products. Hattori manufactures all of their fixed blades, and Moki manufactures their folders.

=== F1 Series variants ===
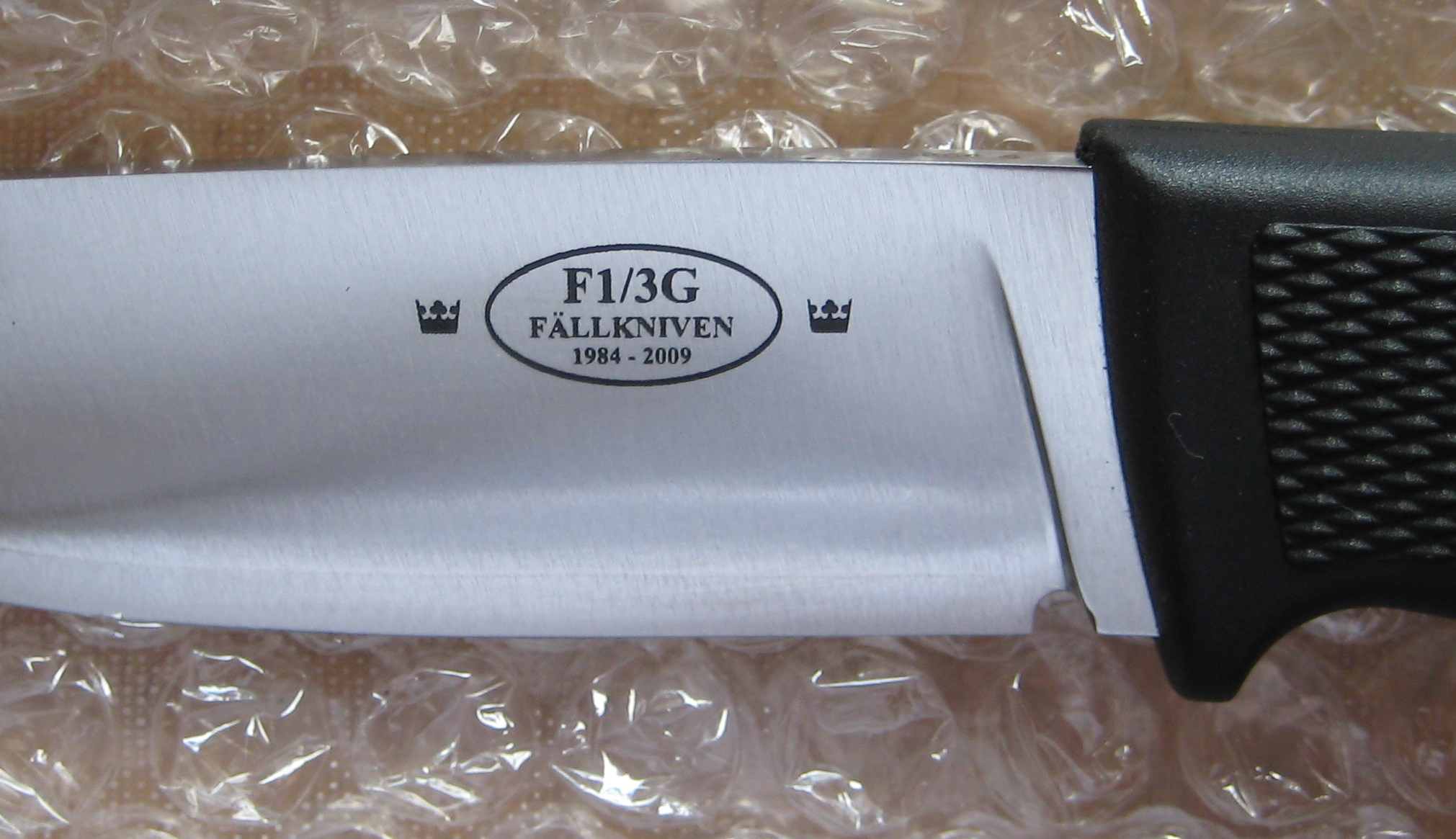
Fallkniven F1, 25 year anniversary blade stamp.

First military order for 10000 units.

First series for civilian market, 15000 made, all numbered.

F1 3G, 25 year special edition. 1000 units numbered on the back.

=== A1 Series variants ===
- Fällkniven A1Z

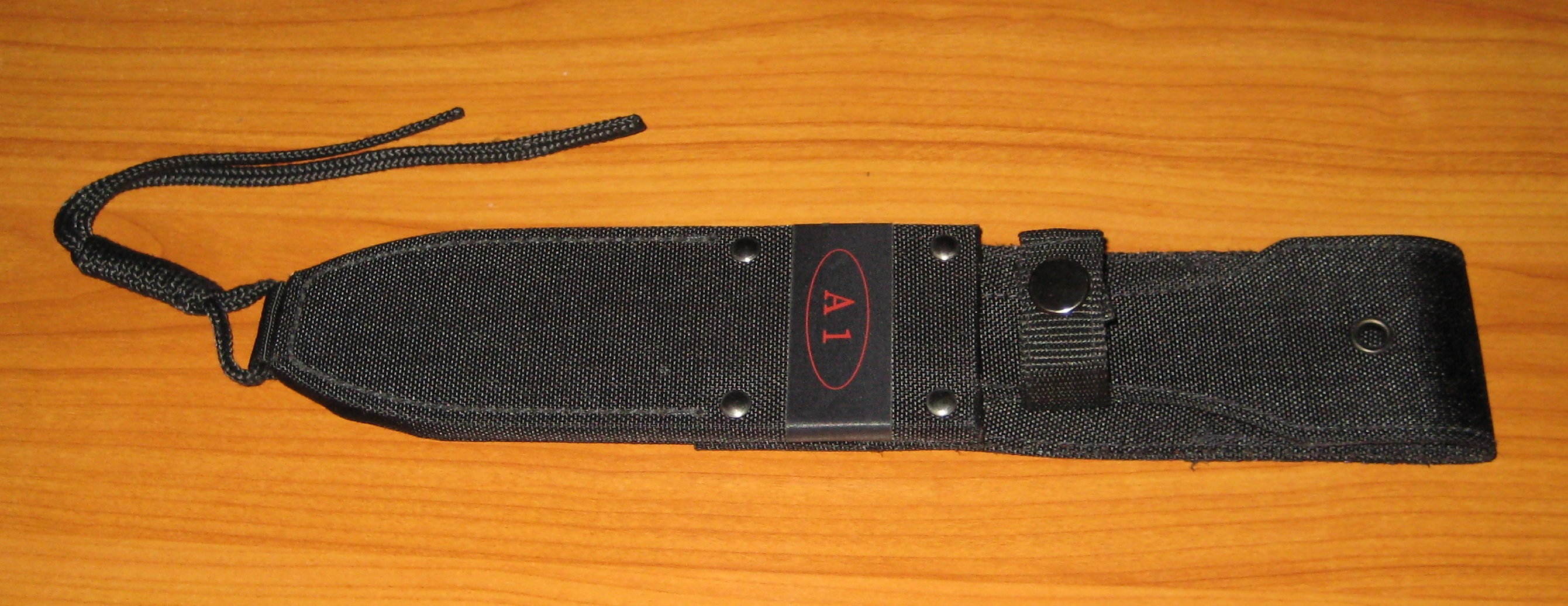
Cordura sheath for Fallkniven A1

Classified into a military-grade build, it boasts an ergonomic design, technical touch, and economical fabrication, which represent the top blend available in the market today. It also encompasses the water-repelling ability, which is ideal for freezing conditions. From start, the knife could be purchased with either a leather sheath or a cordura sheath.

=== S1 Series variants ===
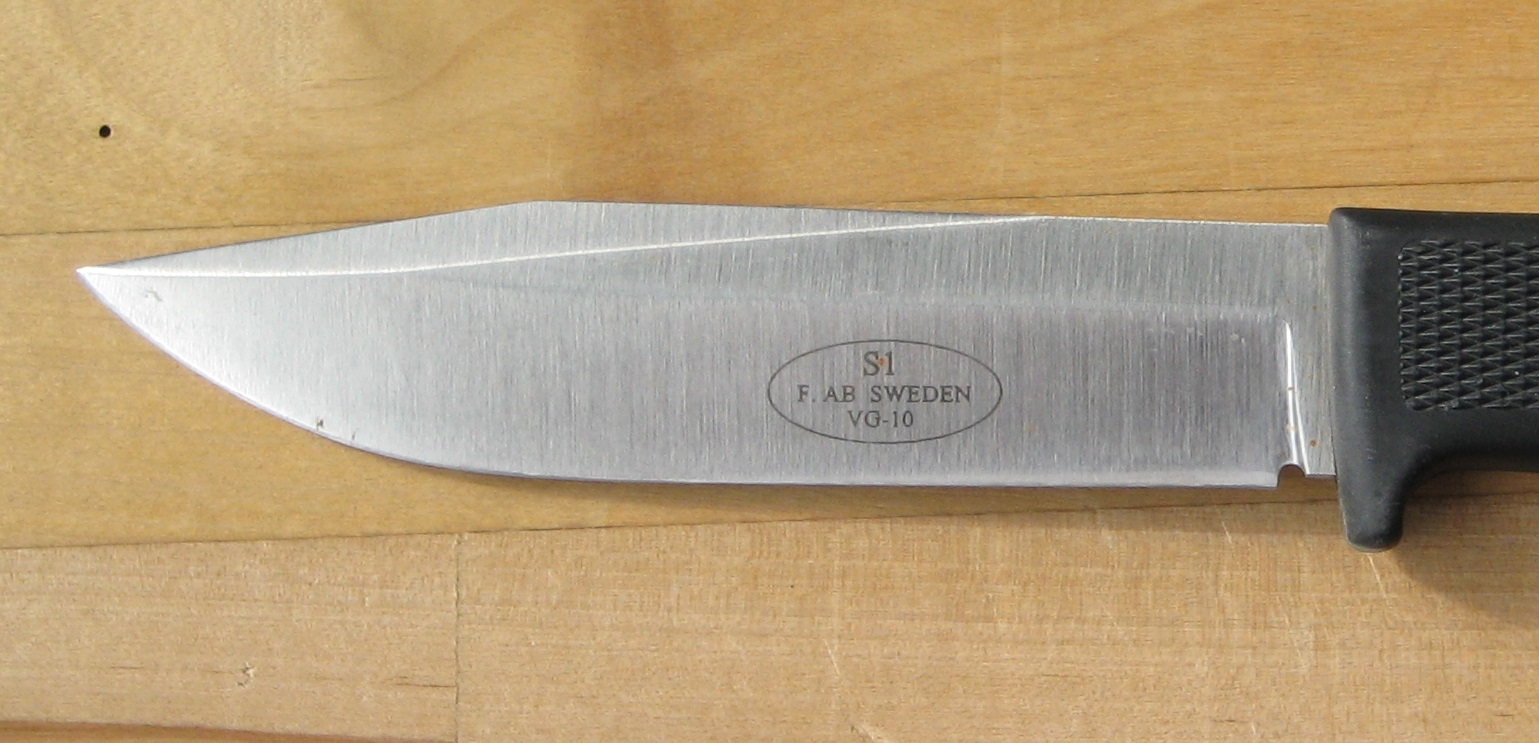
Fallkniven S1, first production stamp.

Very early all VG10.

From start the knife could be purchased with either a brown open leather dangler sheath (like the current black one) or a cordura sheath similar to the A1.

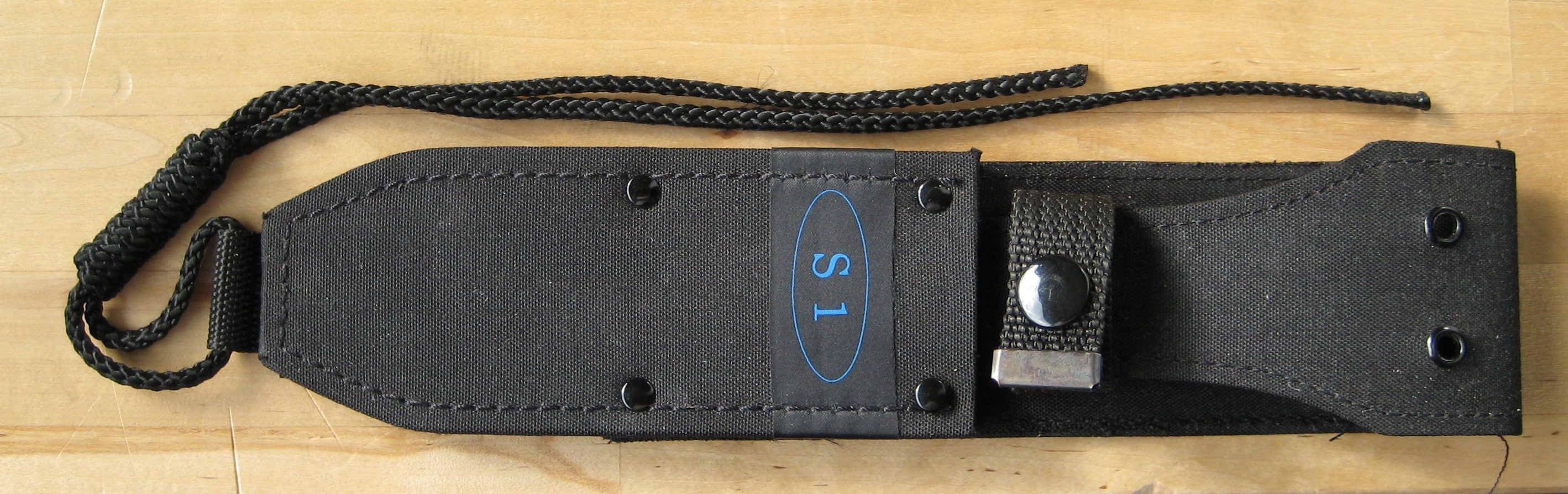
Cordura sheath for Fallkniven S1

=== Special editions ===
Previous Fällkniven offerings that have a serial number or are of limited edition. No longer available in stores.

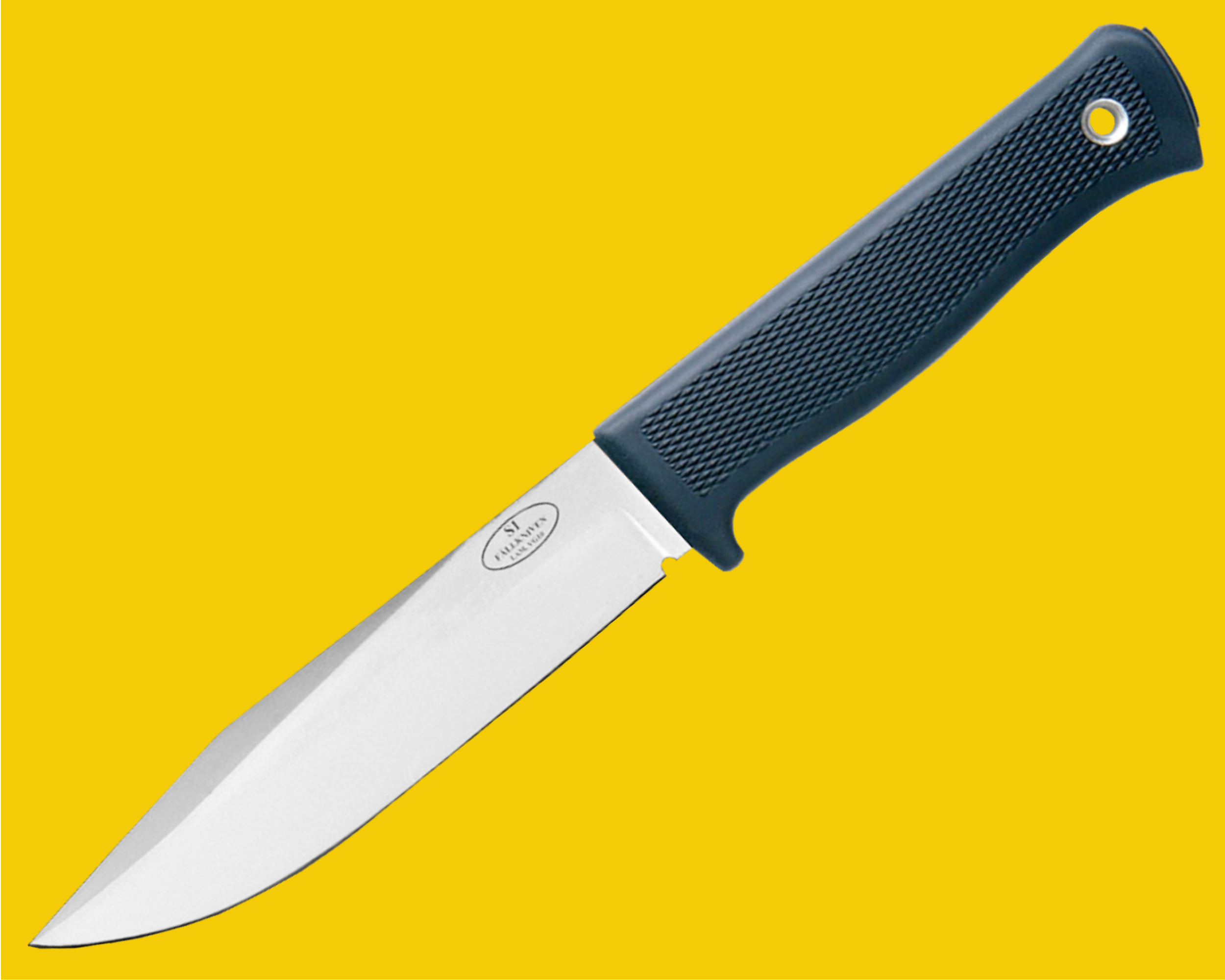
The Fällkniven S1

- 200 First handmade Fällkniven F1 prototypes.
- 15000# Fällkniven F1's first civilian production.(5000 of these also have M-number markings for the Swedish Airforce)
- 500# Fällkniven F1's with titanium oxide coating.
- 200# Fällkniven F1's in VG-10 with Micarta handles.
- 6 Fällkniven F1's in VG-10 with GREY teflon made for Fenwick.
- 6 Fällkniven F1's in VG-10 with GREEN teflon made for Fenwick.
- 110 Fällkniven F1's in 3G. Test models.
- 780# Fällkniven H1's first production.
- 400# Fällkniven H1's with stag handles.
- 200# Fällkniven WM1's with Micarta handles.
- 1000# Fällkniven F1 3G Anniversary edition. Marked with crowns on both sides of the blade logo.

(# means individually numbered).

== U.S. Marine Corps/Navy approved ==
In November 2000, the black versions of models F1 and S1 were tested and approved for use by air crews in the U.S. Marine Corps and U.S. Navy. They met the requirements for function, design, strength and reliability of the Naval Air Warfare Center.

== See also ==
- Survival knife
- Bushcraft
- Survival skills
