= VG-1 =

VG-1 may refer to:

- VG-1 (cell line)
- VG-1 (steel)
- VG-1, one of the variants of the Volkssturmgewehr
