= Columbia River Knife & Tool =

American knife company

Columbia River Knife & Tool, Inc.
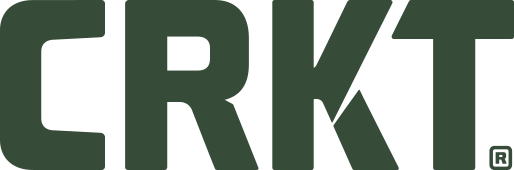
- Company type: Privately Owned
- Industry: Manufacturing
- Founded: 1994; 32 years ago
- Headquarters: Tualatin, Oregon
- Key people: Founders: Paul Gillespi and Rod Bremer, President/Sales executive: Rod Bremer, Finance Executive: Peggy Bremer
- Products: Knives
- Revenue: US $25 million est. Annual Sales
- Number of employees: 40-60
- Website: www.crkt.com

Columbia River Knife & Tool, Inc. (CRKT) is an American knife company established in 1994, and currently based in Tualatin, Oregon, United States. The company's president and sales executive is Rod Bremer and the finance executive is Peggy Bremer.

== History ==
CRKT was founded in 1994 by Paul Gillespi and Rod Bremer. Both individuals were formerly employed with Kershaw Knives. The company did not truly take off until the 1997 Shot Show when the K.I.S.S (Keep It Super Simple) knife was introduced. The small folder, designed by Ed Halligan, was a success. Within the opening days of the show the years worth of the product was sold out. They sold at 4-5 times original production numbers resulting in a tripling of production efforts.

On October 3, 2000, US Customs seized a shipment of 80,000 Chinese CRKT folding knives worth more than $4.3 million. All 50 models seized had always passed every Customs test in prior situations. The shipment had cleared Customs on September 29 but on October 3 an inspector decided that the knives acted like switchblades despite the fact that none of them fit within the definition set forth by the U.S. Switch Blade Knife Act of 1958. On October 17 a letter was co-signed by Oregon U.S. Congresswoman Darlene Hooley and Senator Gordon Smith that petitioned the head of Customs to aid CRKT. Because of their action there was a Federal inquiry of the US Customs actions that had to be answered within thirty days. On October 20 the company was once again allowed to move their product. However this was not before losing over $1 million in sales and spending over $30,000 on legal fees.

== Products ==
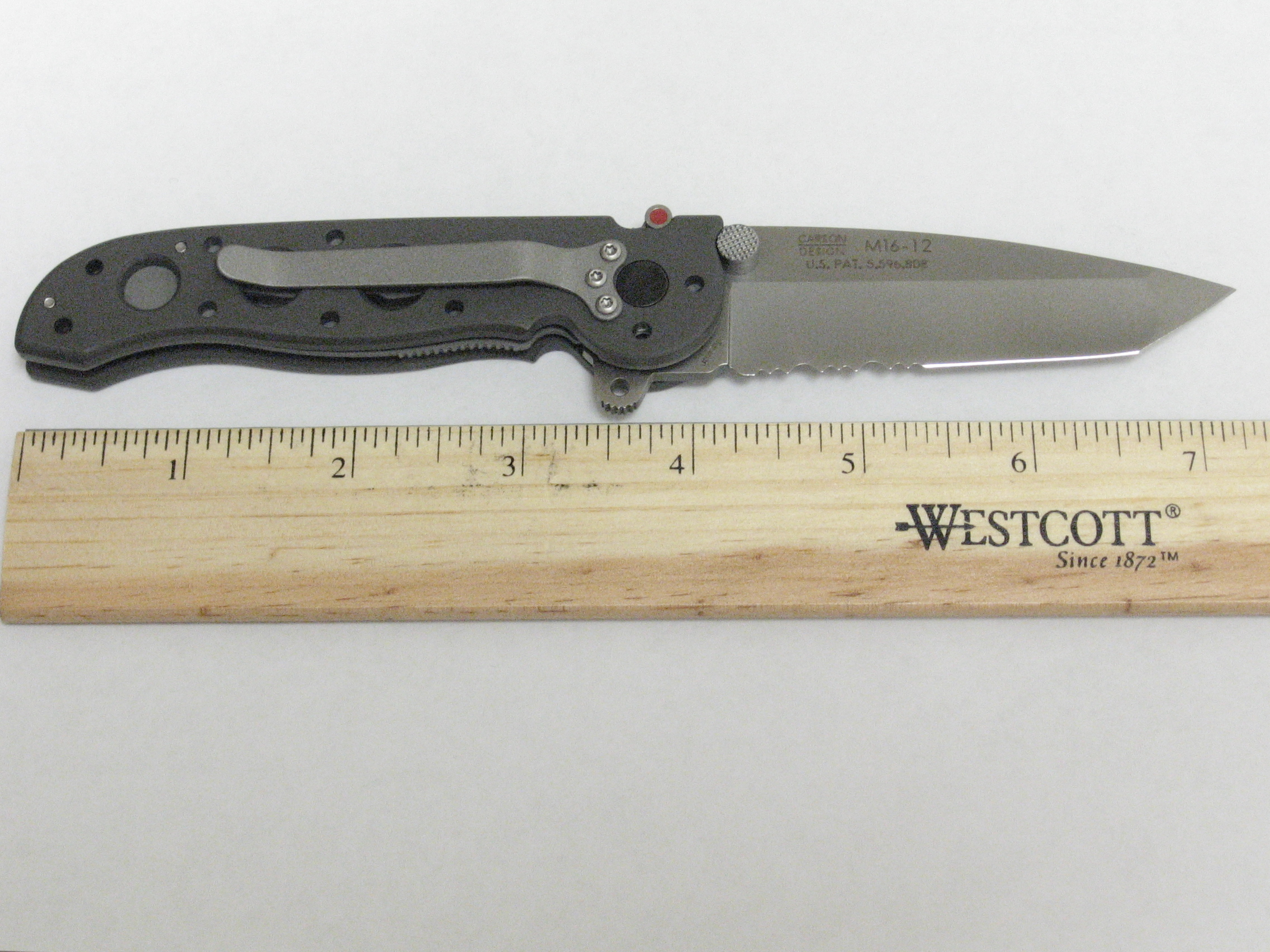
CRKT Carson Design M16-12

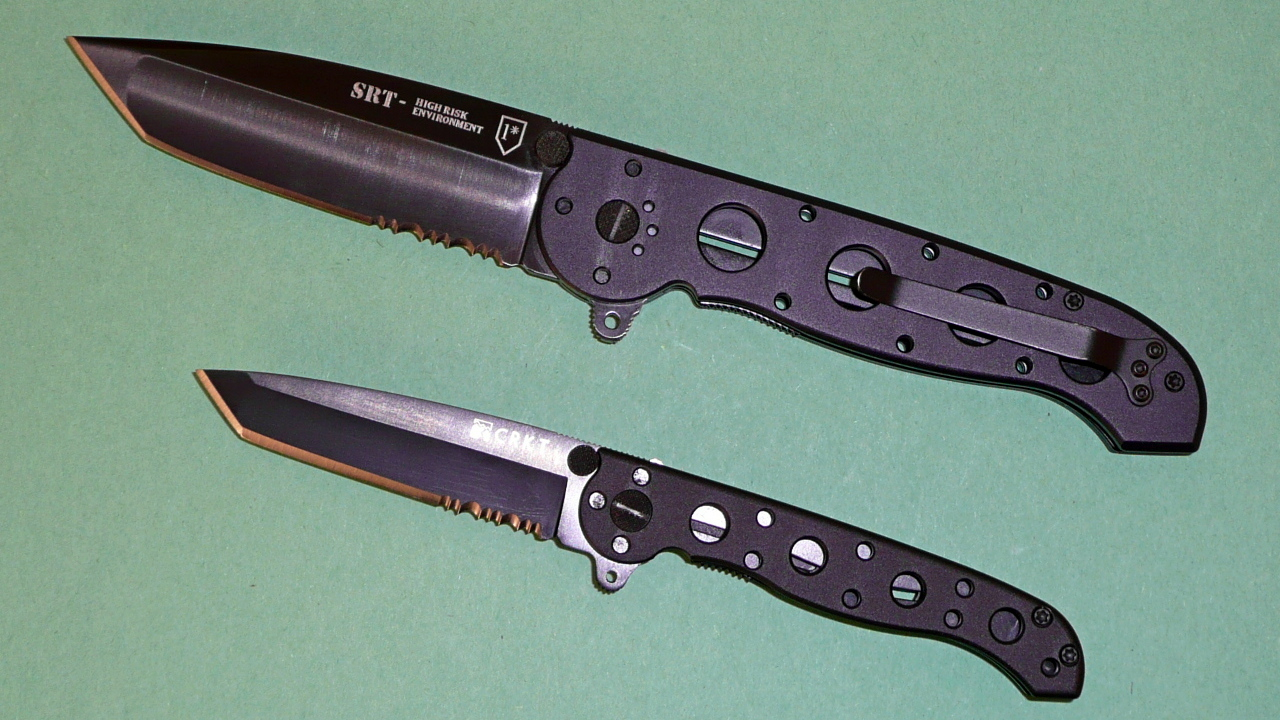
CRKT M16-14LE (up) and CRKT M16-10K (down)

The company produces a wide range of fixed blades and folding knives, multi-tools, sharpeners, and carrying systems. CRKT has collaborated with custom knifemakers such as Ken Onion, Harold "Kit" Carson, Allen Elishewitz, Pat Crawford, Liong Mah, Steven James, Greg Lightfoot, Michael Walker, Ron Lake, Tom Veff, Steve Ryan, Flavio Ikoma, and the Graham Brothers.

One of the company's most famous products is the M16 folding knife, which comes in a number of variations. The M16-13 Military, or M16-13M, is considered a very effective and rugged combat knife. It was developed by Harold "Kit" Carson, a former U.S. Army Sergeant Major. The M16-13M carries the special logo "1*" or "one asterisk," intended to invoke the phrase "one ass to risk." The M16 is equipped with a liner lock and an additional safety system to prevent inadvertent closing. Another notable M16 variation is the larger M16-14D, nicknamed the "Desert Big Dog." The M16-14T is a titanium framed version of the M16-14D.

=== Patents ===
CRKT owns fifteen patents and patents pending. These include the Outburst assist opening mechanism, Lock Back Safety (L.B.S.) mechanism, Veff-Serrated edges, and the Deadbolt Lock.

The Outburst is the company's proprietary mechanism for their assisted-opening knives. These knives are standard pivot joint liner lock or frame lock folding knife. Inside the knife there is a spring tab that catches the tang of the blade as it is manually opened. Once the blade reaches thirty degrees the spring takes over and quickly snaps the knife open.

The Lock Back Safety mechanism, also invented by Ron Lake, is similar in function to the LAWKS mechanism. It is a lockback folder with a switch that can prevent the locking bar from being depressed. Inside the handle there is a small rod with a flange near the butt of the handle. The other end is connected to a switch near the pivot end. When the switch is pulled back (away from the pivot) the lock functions as a regular lockback. When the switch is closed the flange on the rod slides under tip of the locking bar at the butt end. This prevents the depression of the bar and the blade from unlocking. When the knife is closed the system functions the same way to lock it closed or allow it to open.

Veff-Serrations were developed by Tom Veff, a sharpener and knife maker, and are exclusively licensed to CRKT for production. The Veff-Serrations differ from standard ones in that they are large and set at an angle of 60 degrees whereas most serrations are small and arranged 90 degrees from the cutting surface.

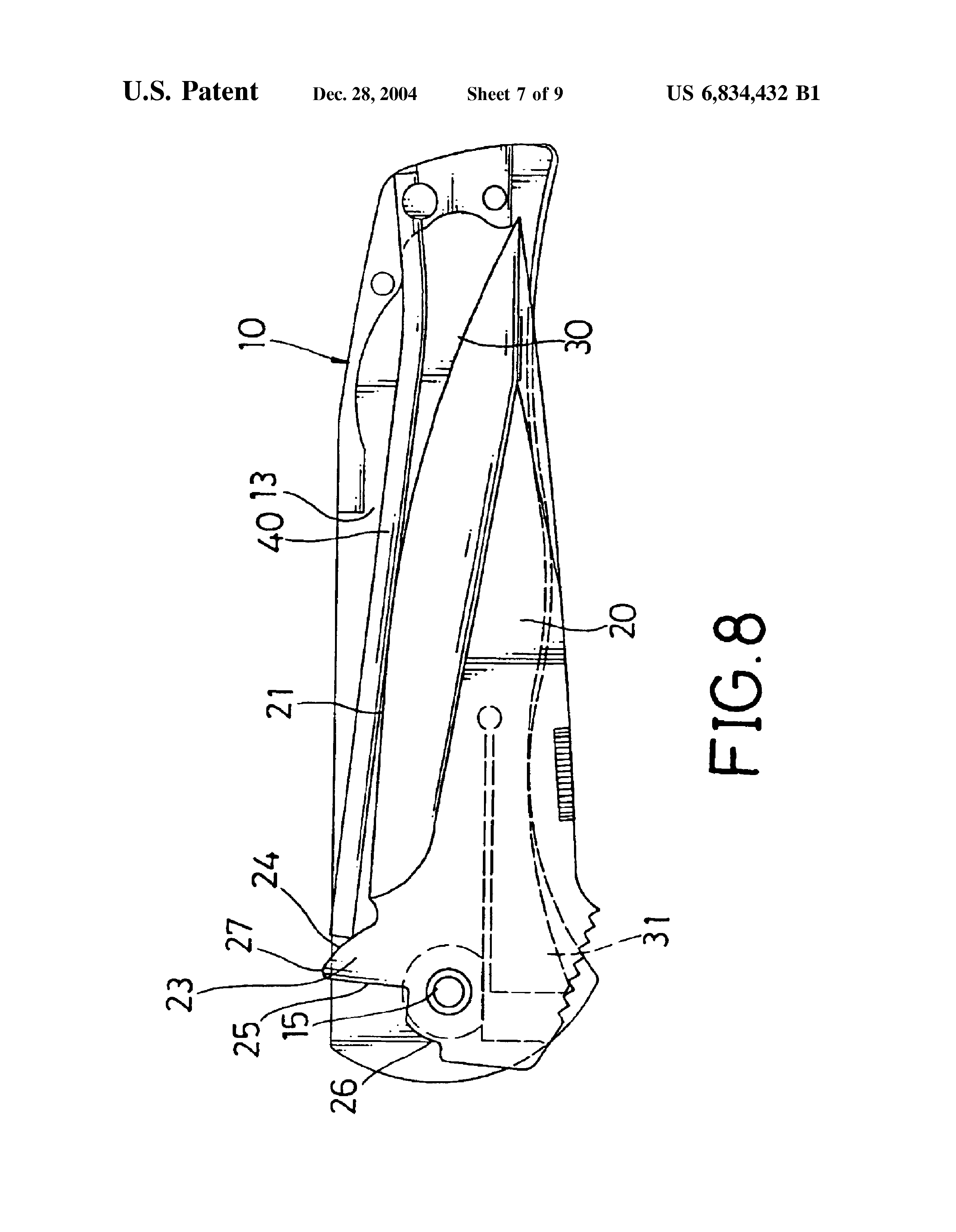
A closed knife with Outburst

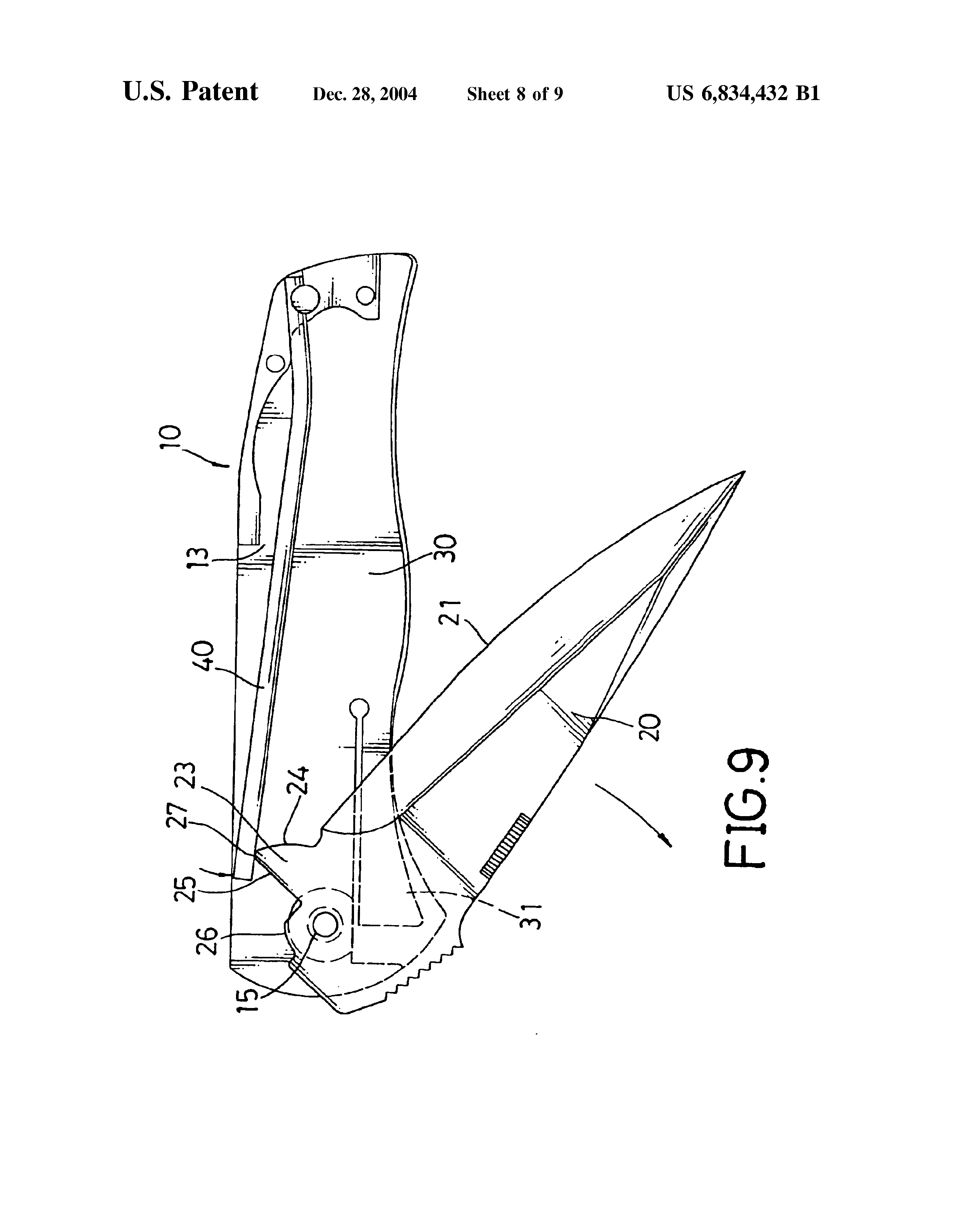
Outburst operating as the knife is opening

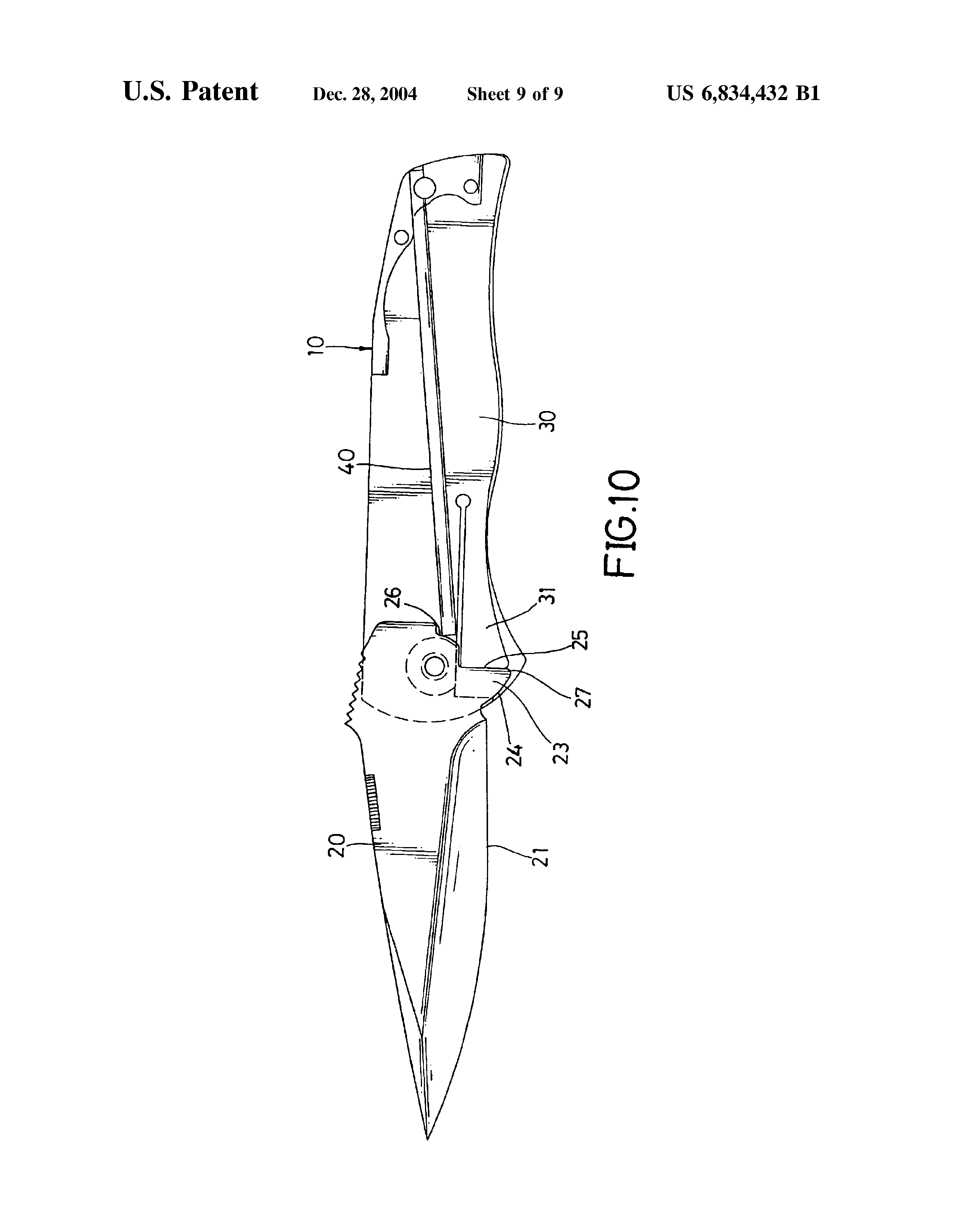
Outburst once the knife has opened

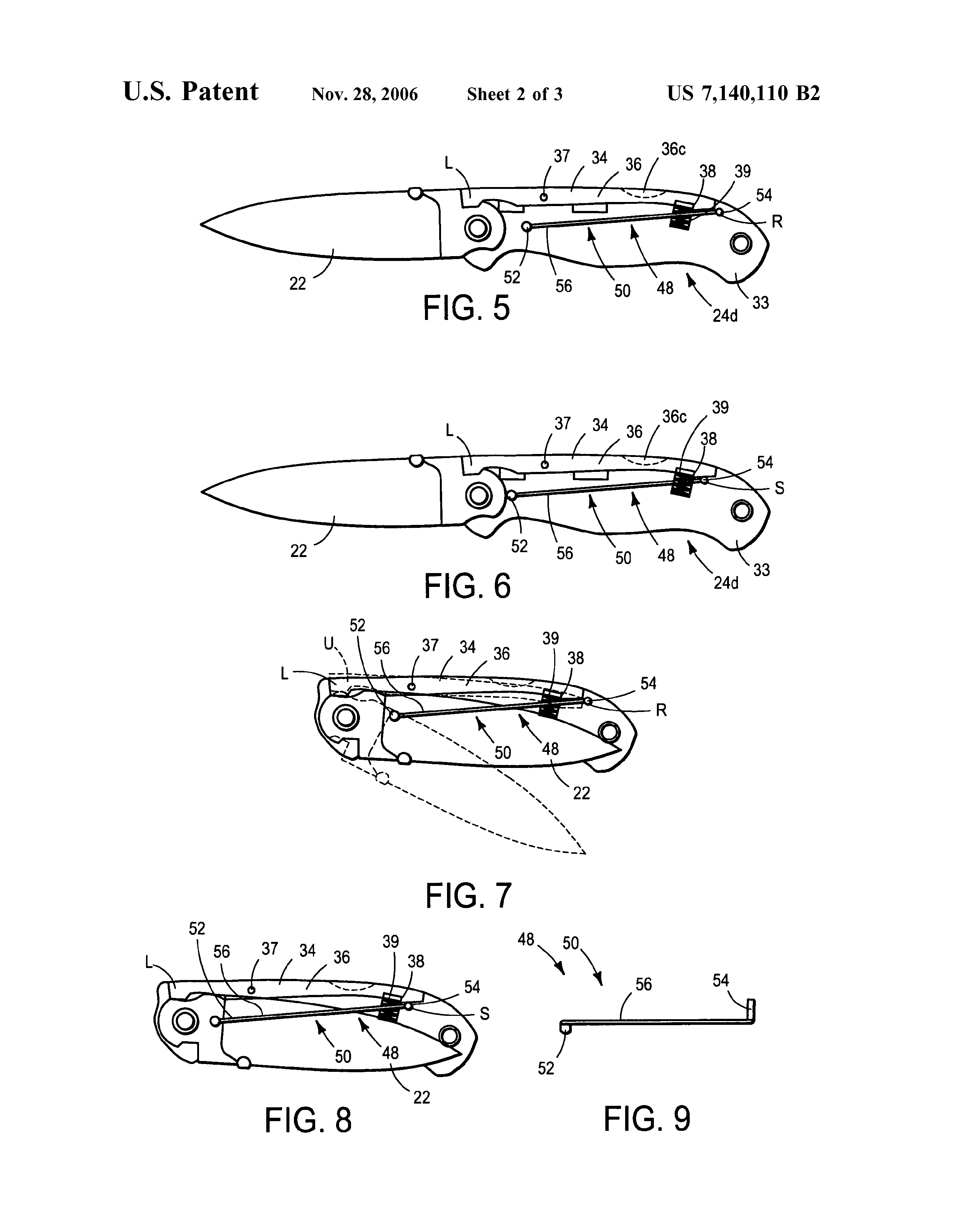
Schematics of the L.B.S. mechanism

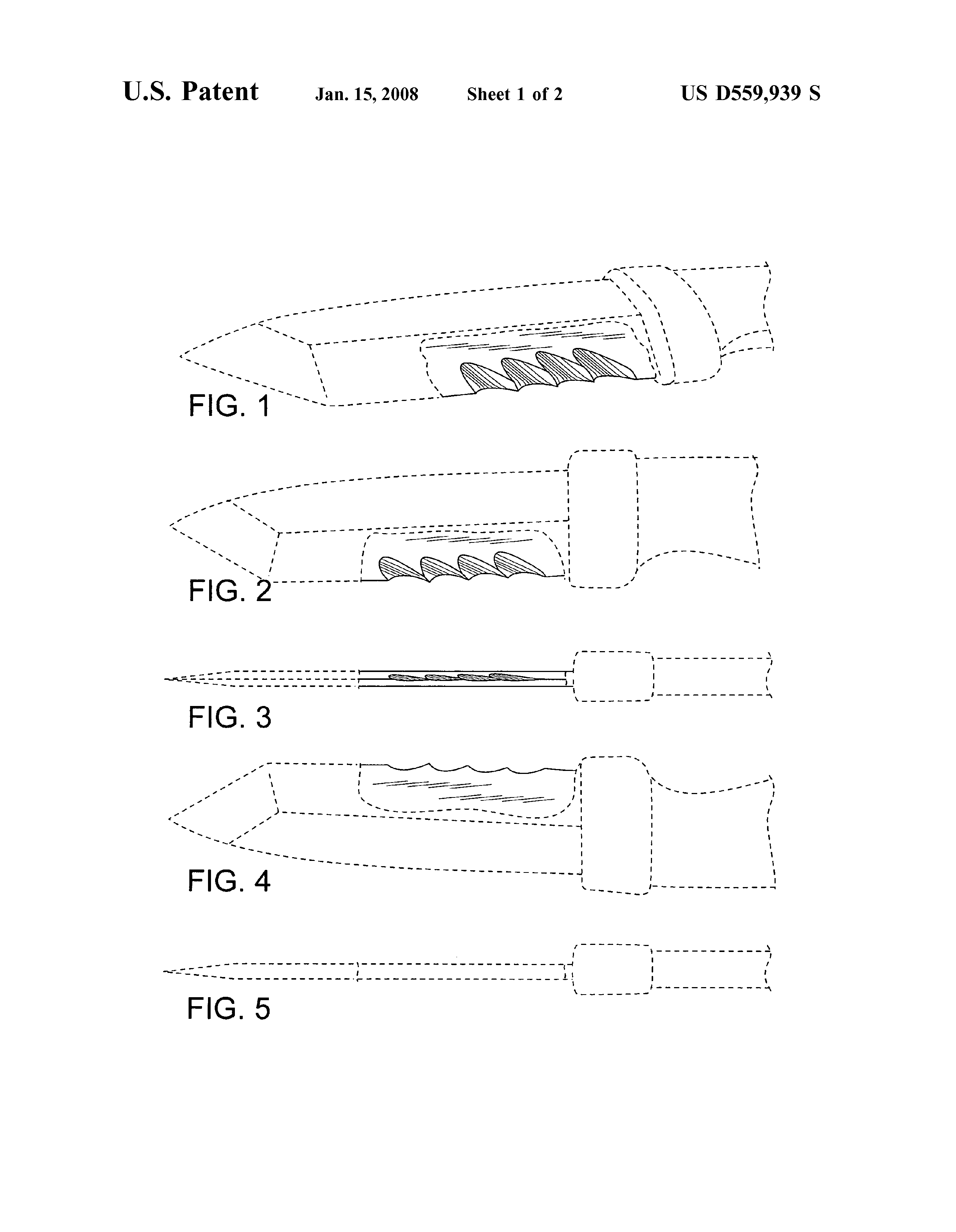
Diagrams of the Veff-Serrations

== Gallery ==
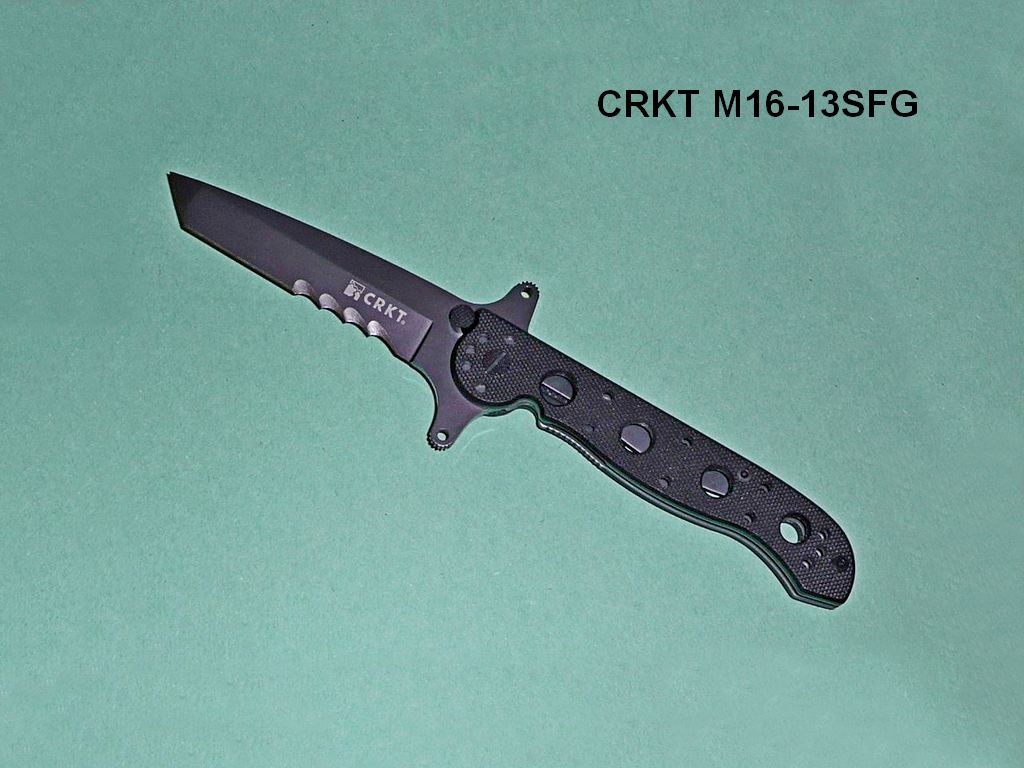

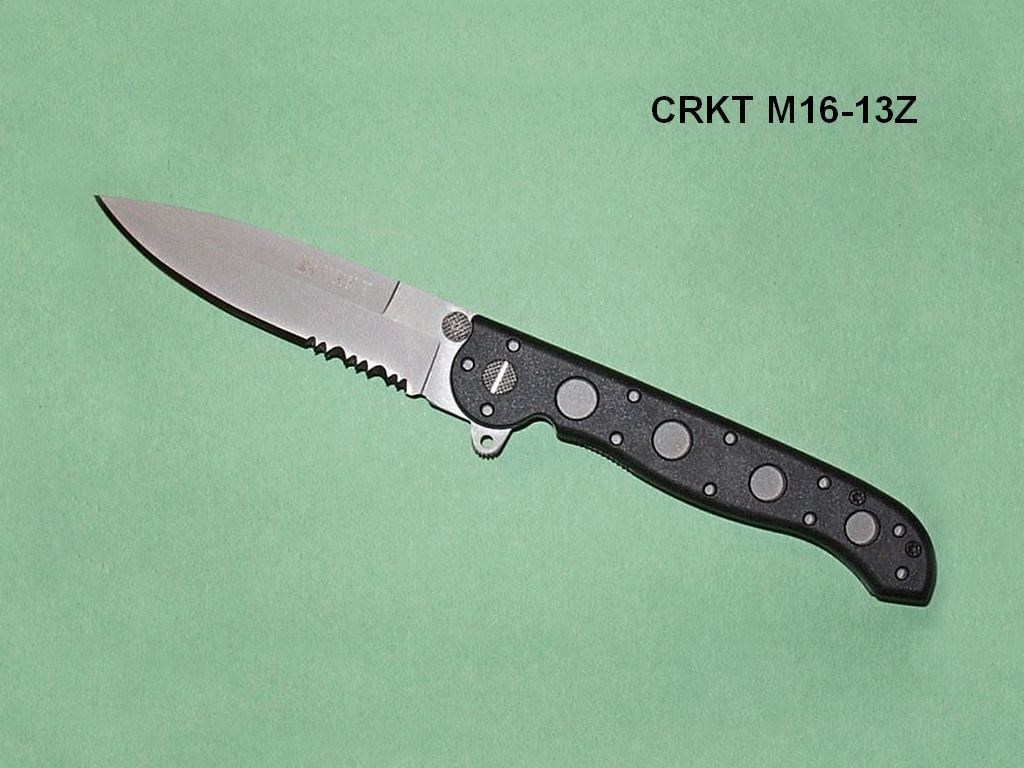

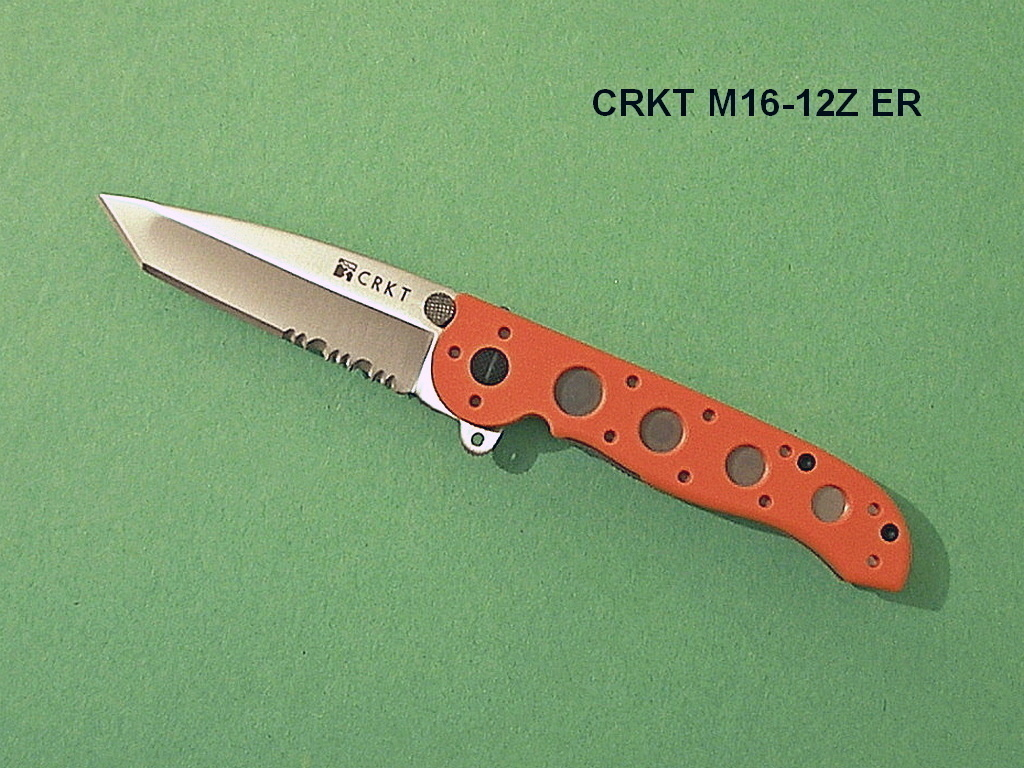

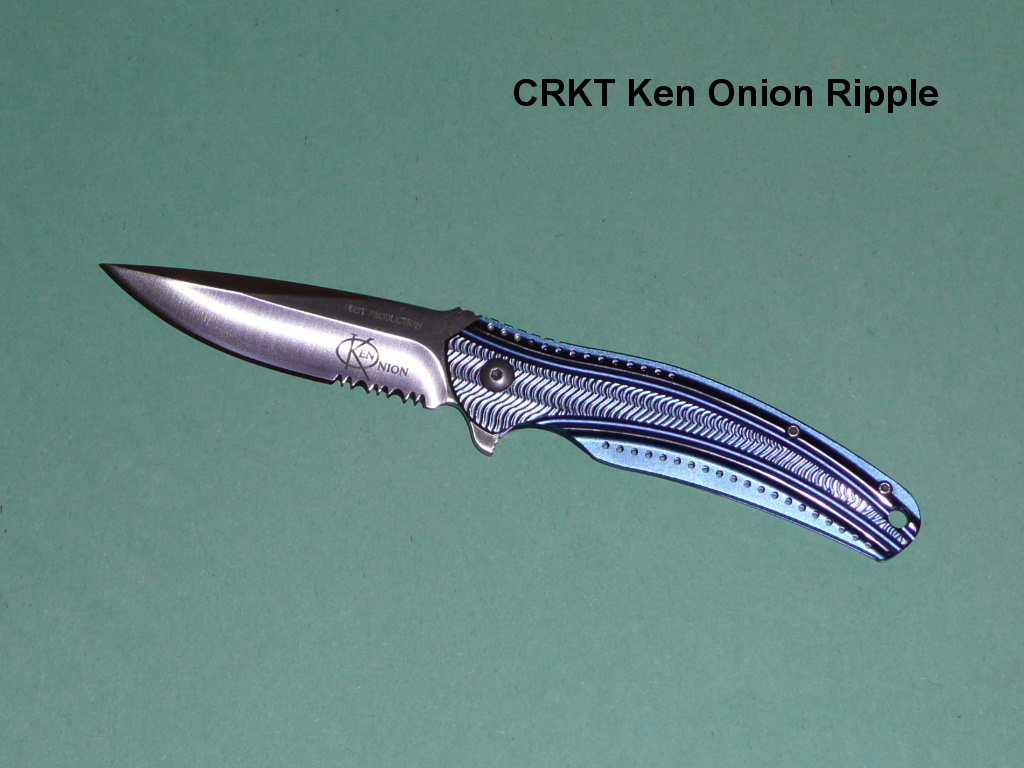

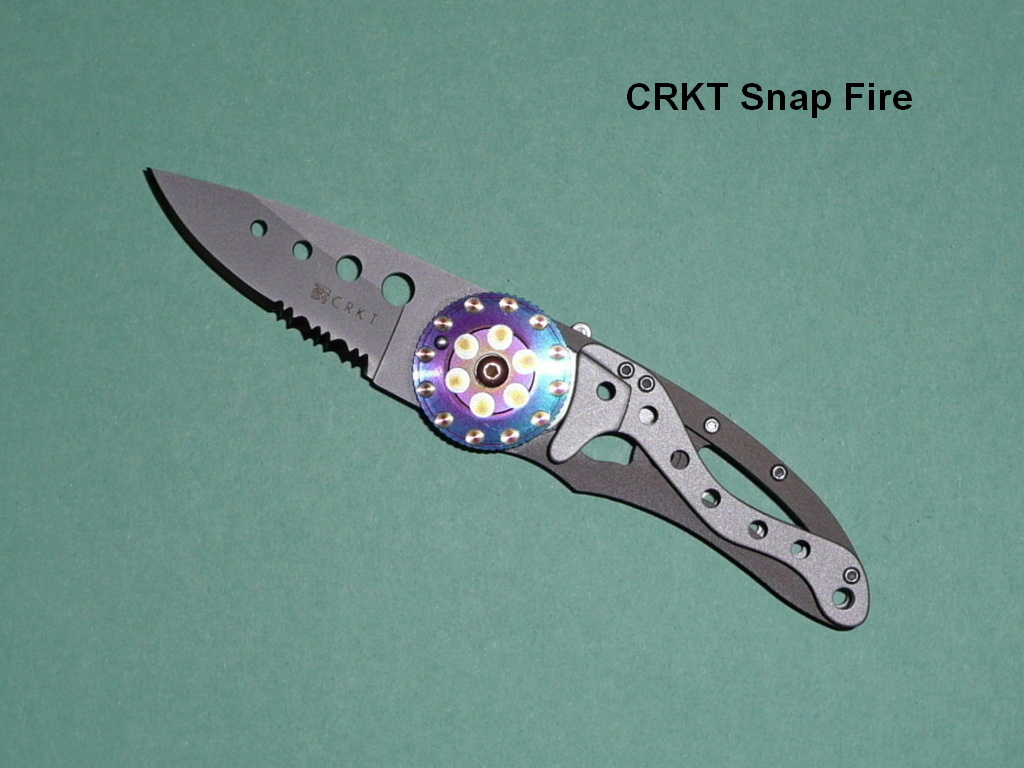

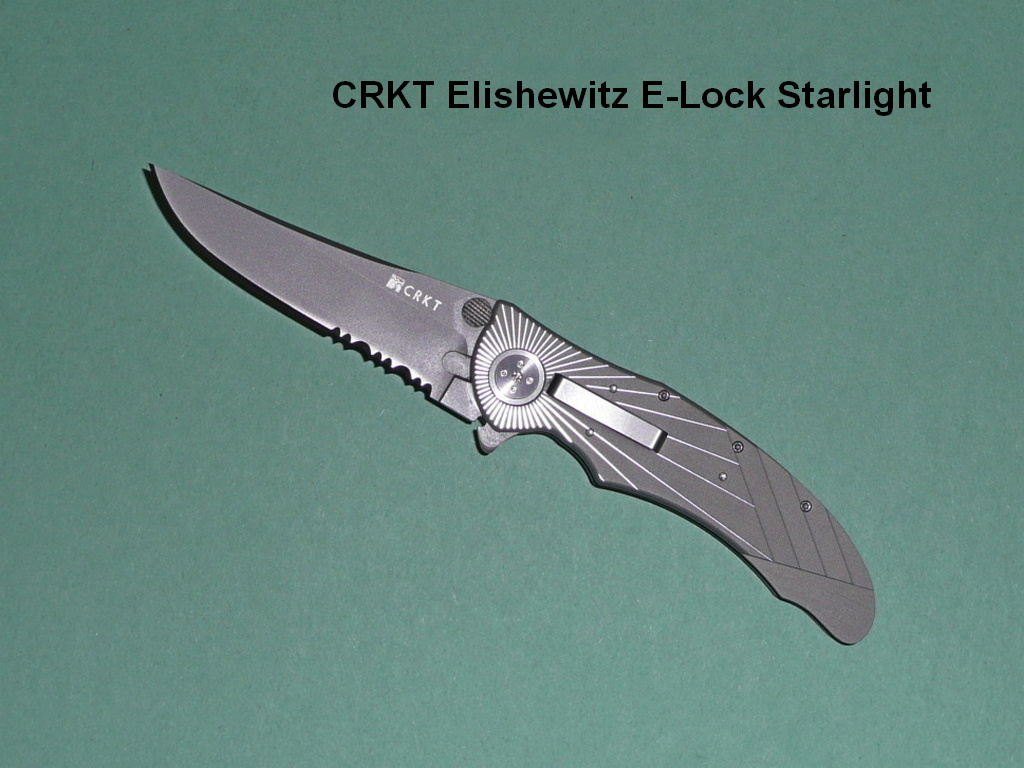

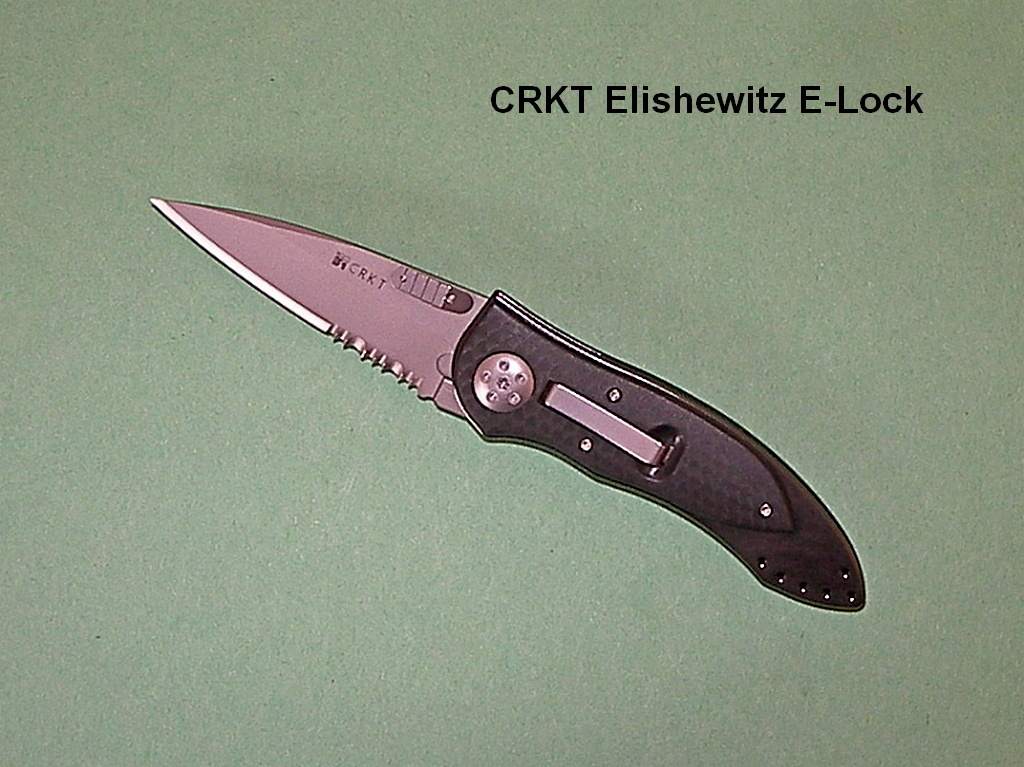

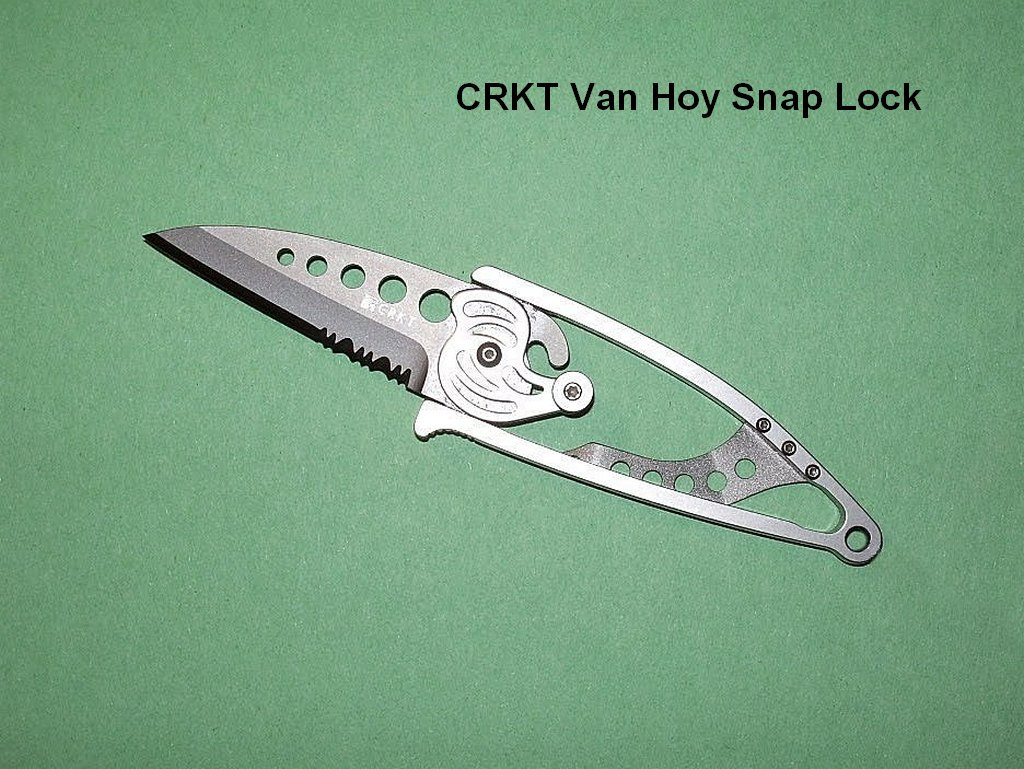

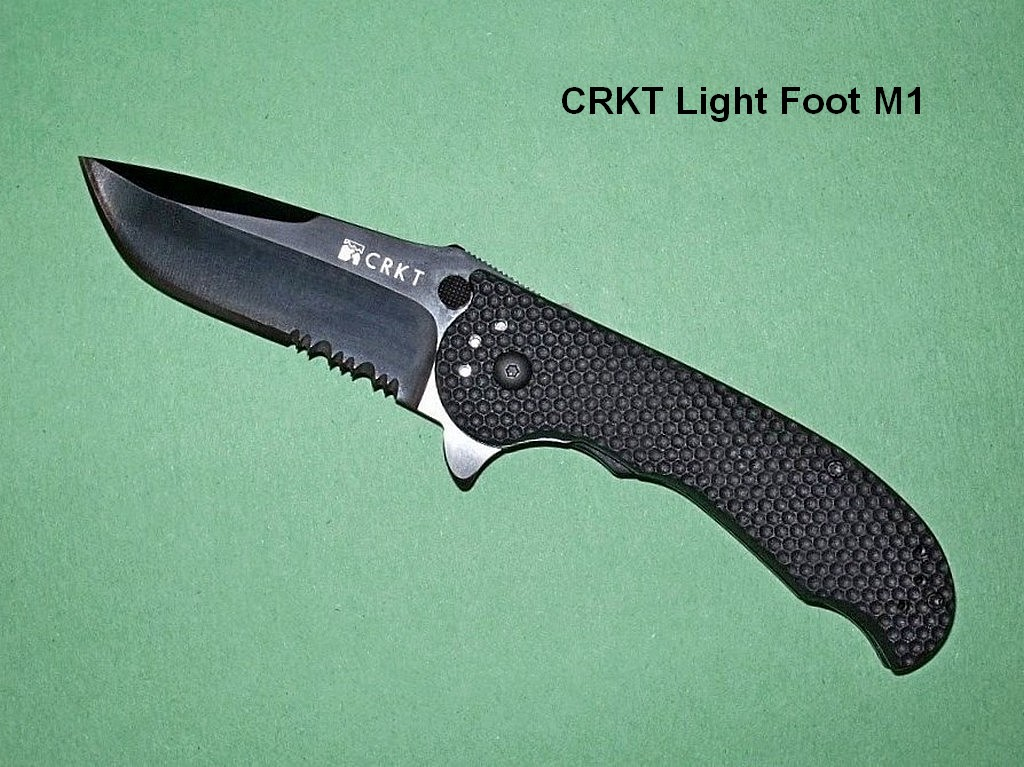

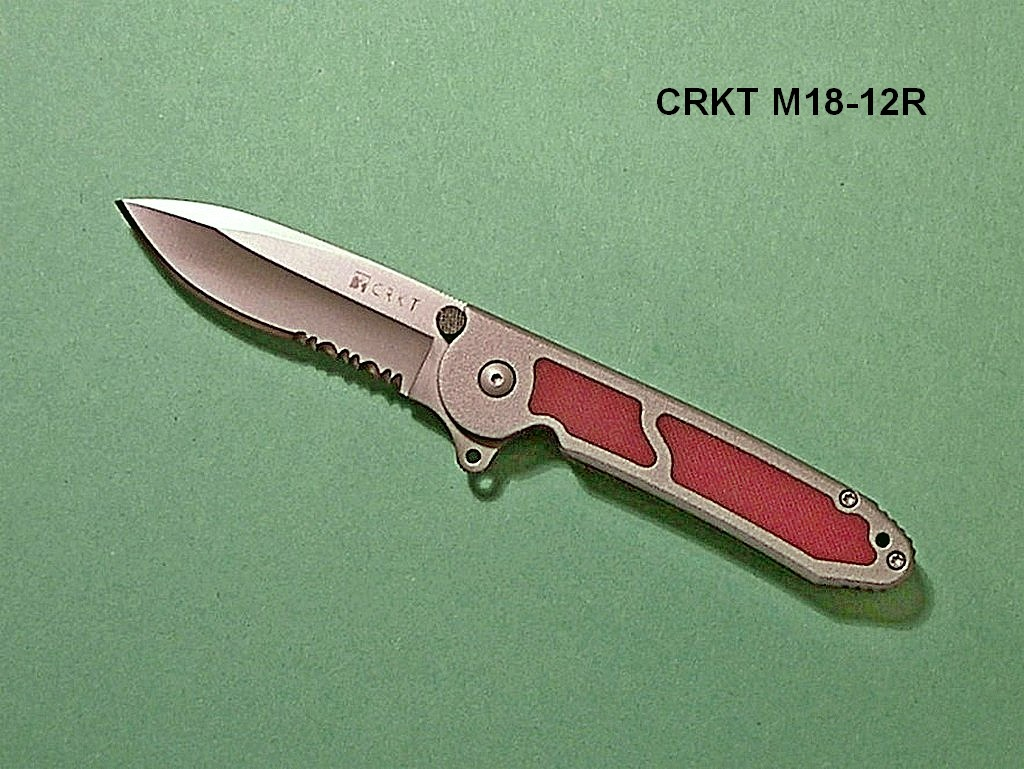

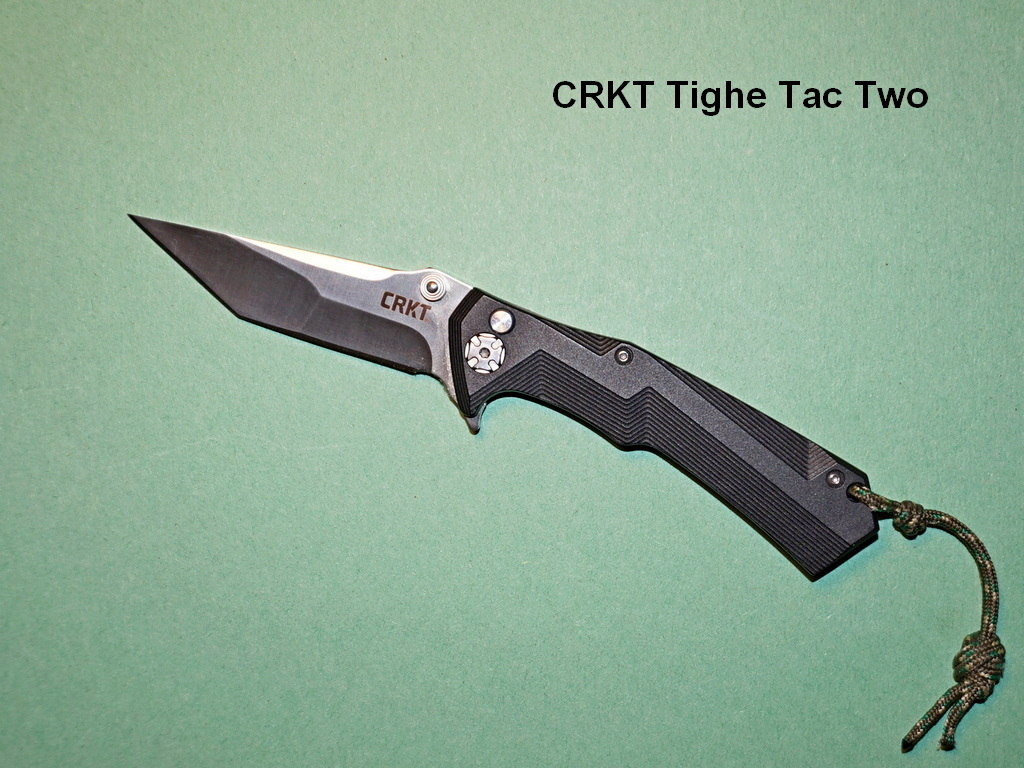

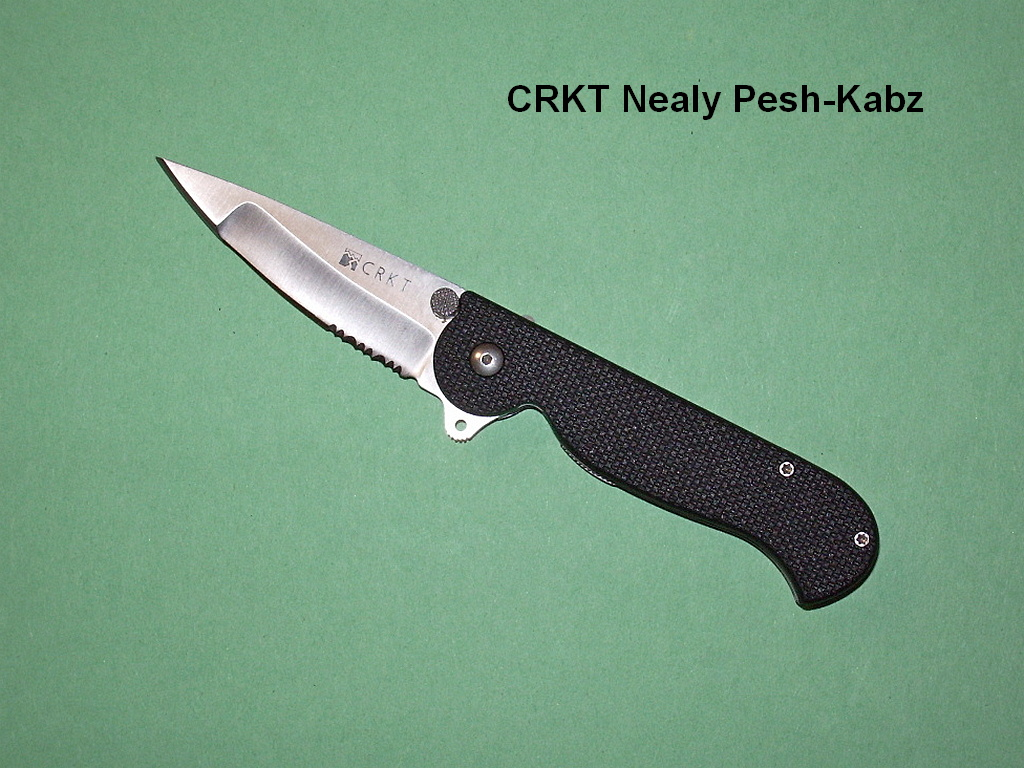

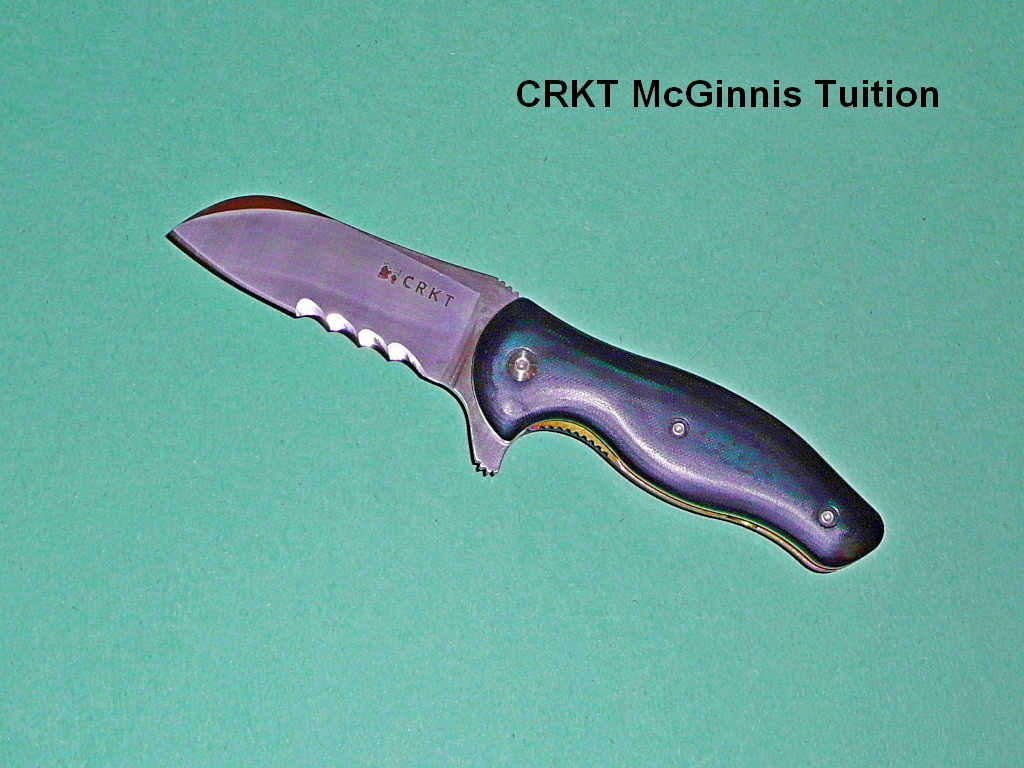

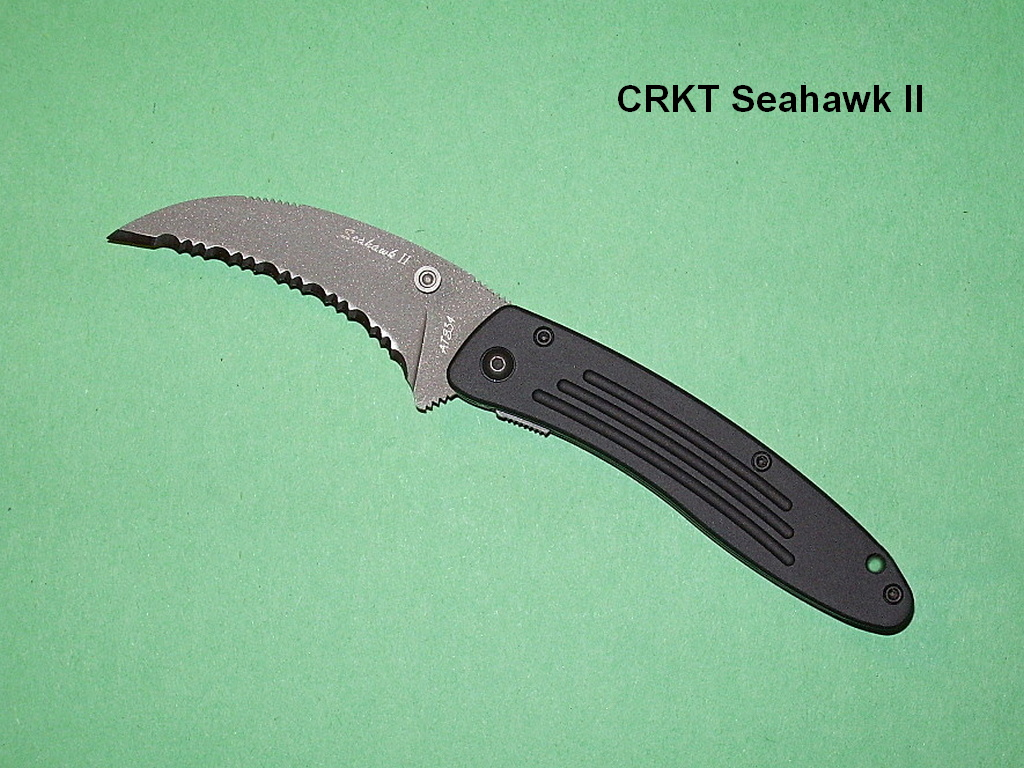

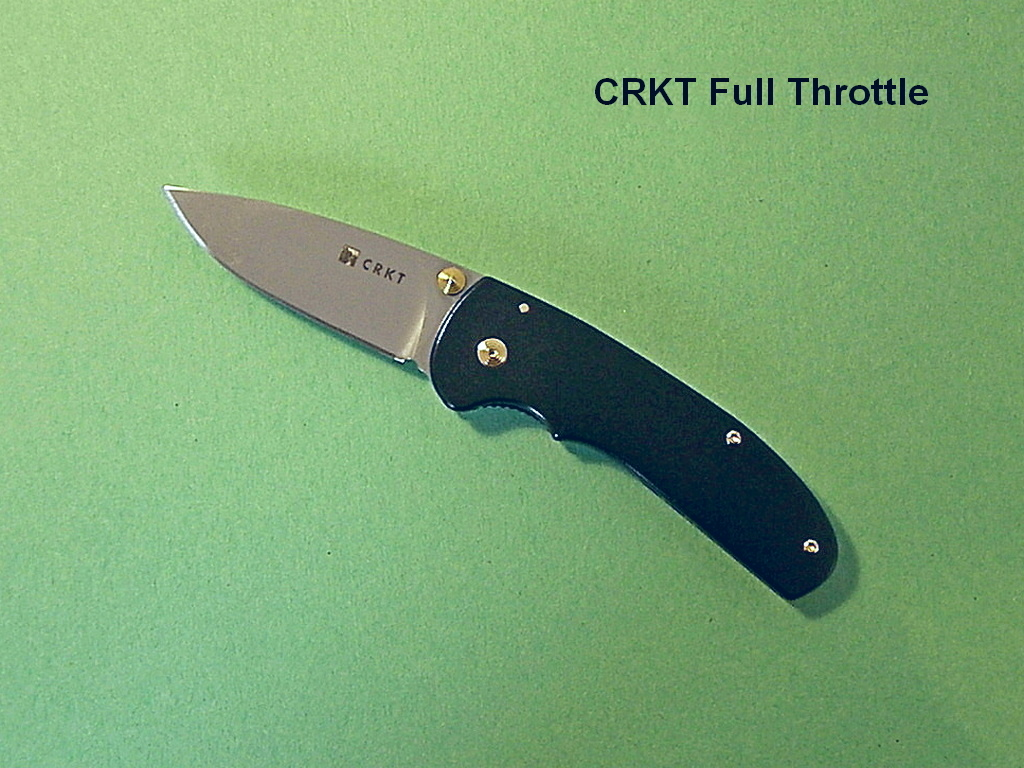

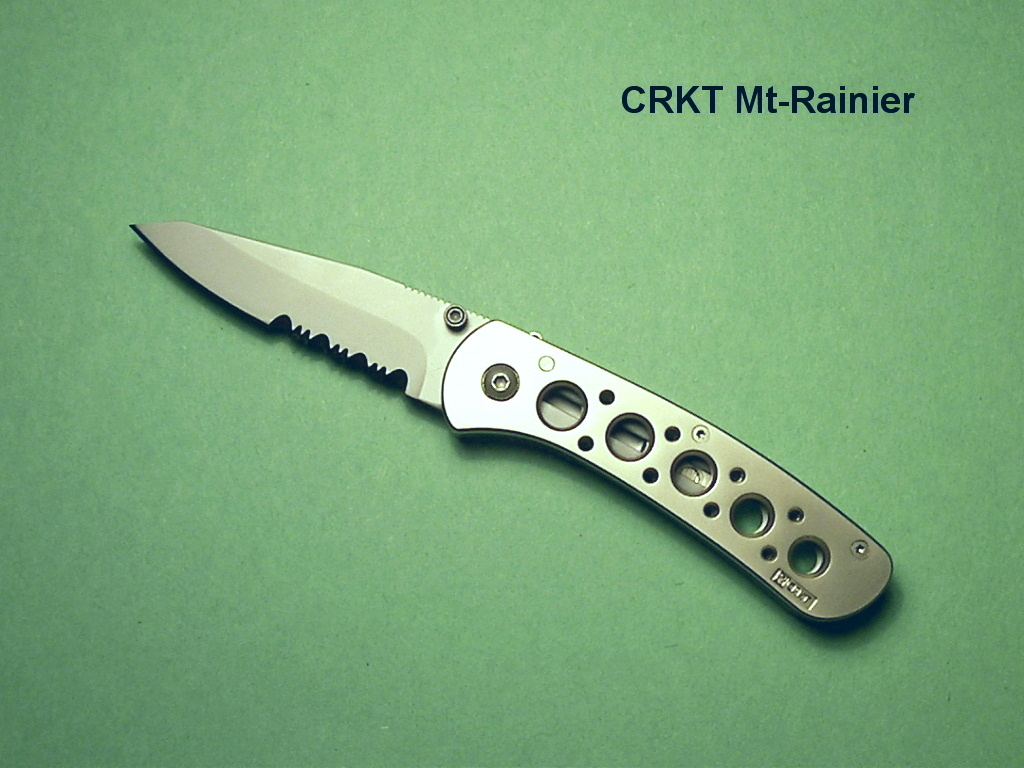

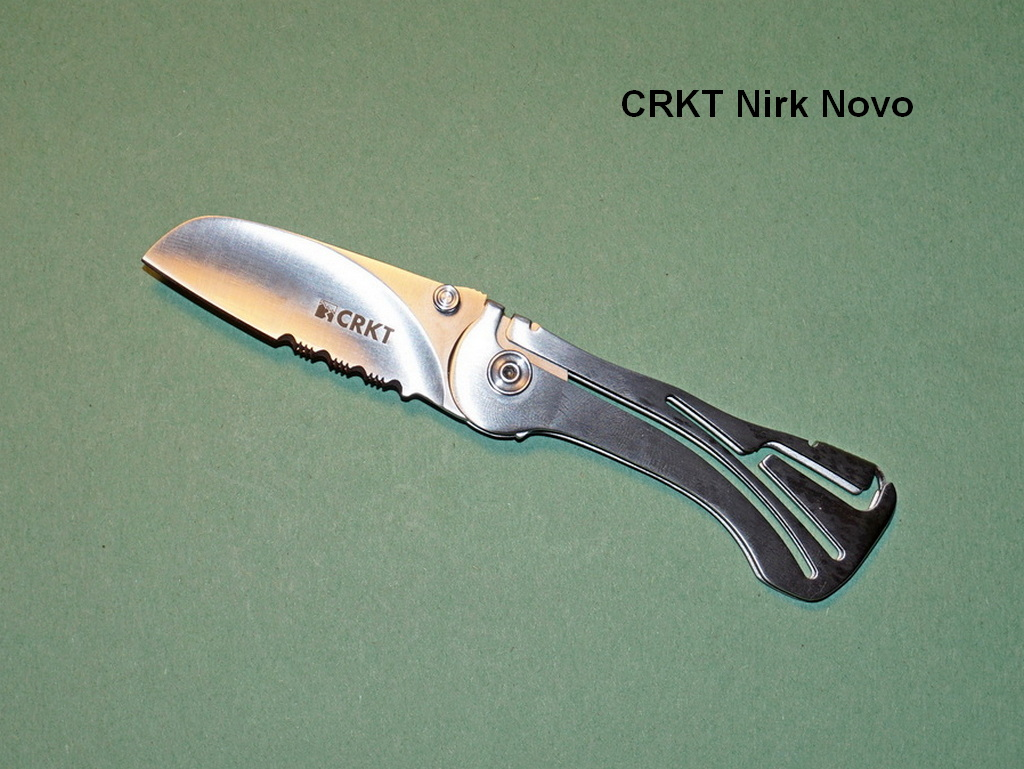

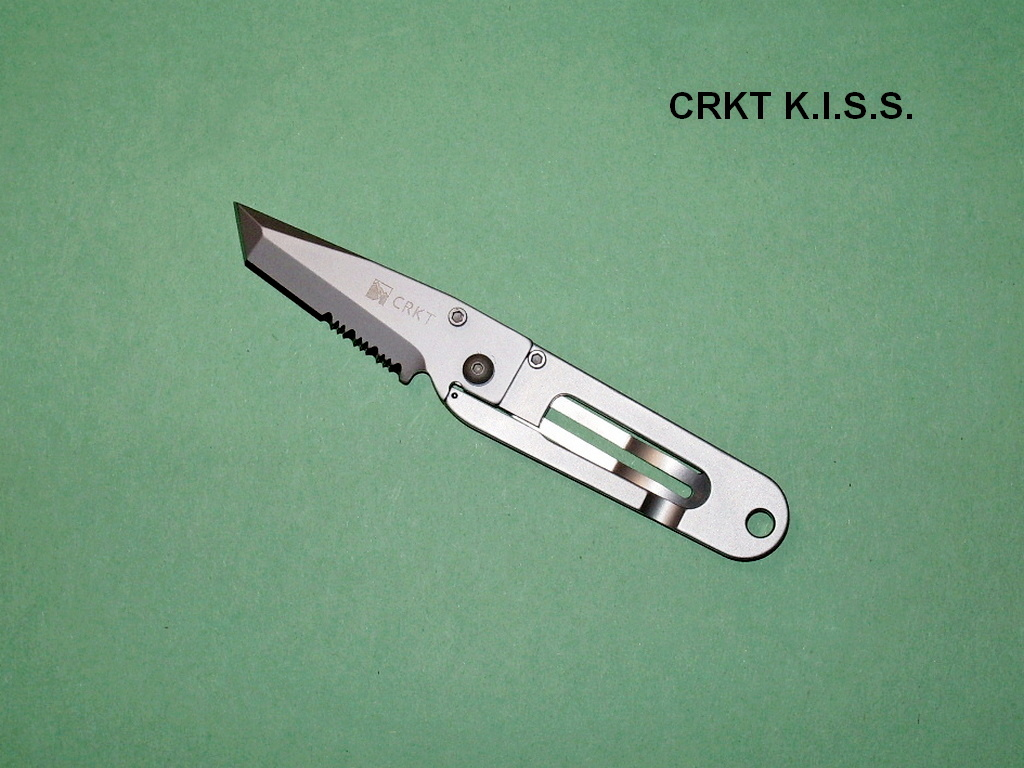

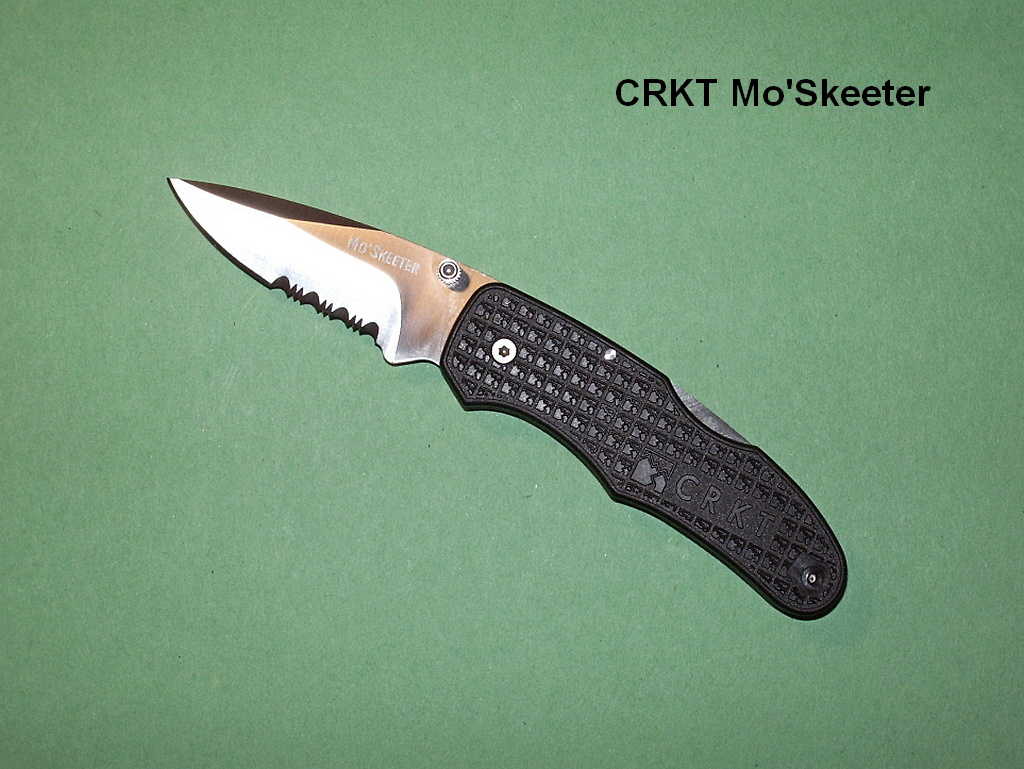

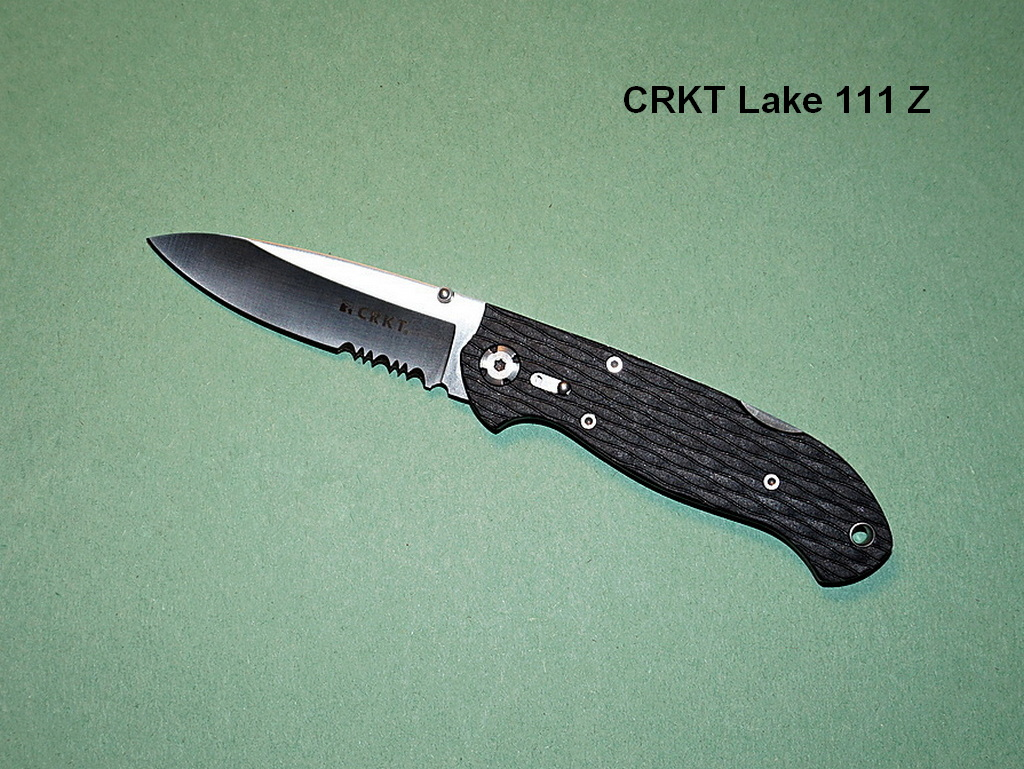

== See also ==
- List of companies based in Oregon
