= Robert Terzuola =

American knife maker (born 1944)

- Born: September 14, 1944 (age 82); Brooklyn, New York, U.S.
- Education: New York University
- Occupations: Knifemaker, jeweler

Robert G. Terzuola (born 1944) is an American knife maker who popularized the type of knife known as the tactical folding knife.

== Early life ==
Terzuola was born in Brooklyn, New York on 14 September 1944. He attended Stuyvesant High School where his academic achievements earned him a full scholarship to New York University where he studied vocational education. Upon graduation in 1966 he joined the Peace Corps and went to Panama as a volunteer for two years, after which he was invited to become a Peace Corps trainer in Puerto Rico. He worked as a field supervisor for several experimental education projects in Guatemala and in the mid-eighties, directed the War Damage Surveys in El Salvador and Guatemala for AID's Office of Foreign Disaster Assistance. Terzuola taught himself jade carving and became General Manager of a Jade Jewelry company in the town of Antigua, Guatemala. By 1980, Terzuola began making knives professionally while managing the Jade business and that same year joined the Knifemakers' Guild on an endorsement from Bob Loveless. Terzuola has also enjoyed membership in the German and Italian Knifemakers Guilds.

== Knifemaking ==
Terzuola's first knives were fixed blade, combat designs, made for soldiers, CIA operatives and security personnel working in Guatemala, El Salvador and Nicaragua.

In 1984 he relocated to Santa Fe, New Mexico and began making folding knives. Seeing a need for a knife that could be carried discreetly he developed a model using black micarta for scales and bead-blasted titanium frames; for this effort he coined the term "Tactical Knife".

Terzuola's most popular model is the ATCF (Advanced Technology Combat Folder), a linerlock folding knife. This was his first tactical folding knife, although he makes it with non-tactical materials on occasion with ivory or stag scales and damascus steel blades. He is widely considered to be the first maker and “Godfather” of tactical folding knives.

Terzuola has authored a book about the design of tactical knives which was updated and expanded in the 2019 edition. He has authored articles about tactical knives and knifemaking for Blade, Soldier of Fortune and other publications. In 2008 he relocated his shop to Albuquerque, New Mexico.

Terzuola has collaborated with other knifemakers and production companies including Spyderco, Strider Knives, and Microtech Knives. Terzuola's first factory collaboration was with Spyderco to produce the C-15 model in 1990. This knife was the first liner lock folder produced by a commercial factory using G-10 scales (1994-1997), ATS-34 steel (1990-1997), along with using parts blanked by laser instead of stamping. Prior to 1994, the C-15 used black bead blasted 6061-T6 aluminum handles. In 2016, Bob and his wife Suzi moved his home and shop to San Diego, California where he continues to hand-make high quality folding and fixed blade knives. In June of 2023, Terzuola was inducted into the “Cutlery HALL of FAME” at the Blade knife show in Atlanta Georgia. He had already been named as one of the four living “Mount Rushmore” Legends of modern Knifemaking.
