= Ken Onion =

American knifemaker (born 1963)

Kenneth L. Onion
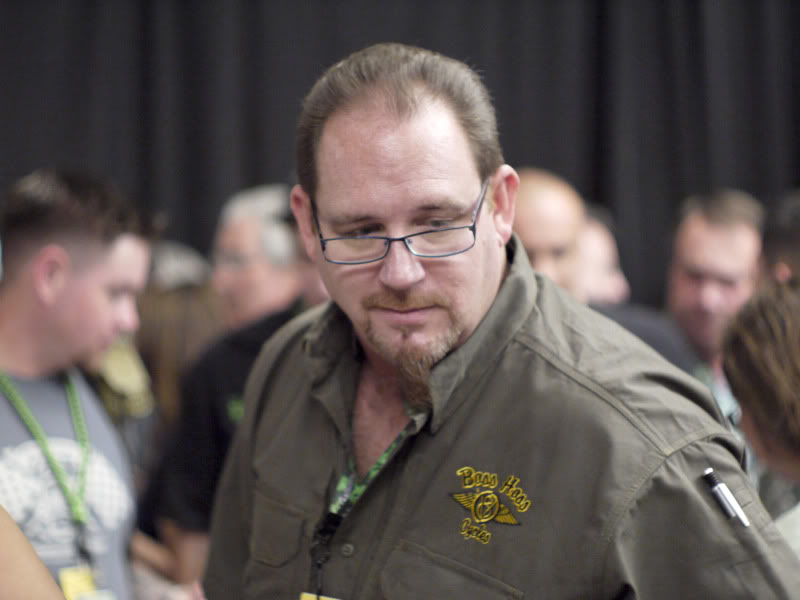
- Born: January 16, 1963 (age 62); Wellington, Ohio, US
- Occupation: Knifemaker
- Spouse: Noel Onion
- Awards: Blade Cutlery Hall of Fame

Ken Onion (born January 16, 1963) is an American custom knifemaker based in Kaneohe, Hawaii, United States who invented the "SpeedSafe" assisted opening mechanism for Kershaw Knives. Ken Onion was the Premier Knife Designer for Kershaw Knives.

== Designs ==
As a US Marine, Onion devised a helicopter mechanism that was adopted for use by the military. In 1989, Ken's wife, Noel, made arrangements through a friend for Onion to meet custom knife maker Stanley Fujisaka. The two became friends and Onion learned his basic knifemaking skills from Stanley, building his first knife in 1991. Five years later, in 1996, Doug Flagg, then with Kershaw Knives met Onion while calling on an account for Kershaw and the two discussed an arrangement for the assisted-opening mechanism, which led to a contract. This contract led to Kershaw expanding its factory and number of employees to accommodate the demand for these knives.

Onion has since moved on to design knives for Columbia River Knife and Tool, and most recently a knife sharpener with Work Sharp.

Onion holds 36 design patents on different items including locks, mechanisms, and knife designs. Most notable of these is the Speed-safe mechanism used by Kershaw Knives. For these many designs and his work throughout the cutlery industry promoting the art of knife making, Onion was inducted into the Blade Magazine Cutlery Hall of Fame at the 2008 Blade Show in Atlanta, Georgia as the 45th and youngest living member.

In 2005, Onion collaborated with Spyderco on the Spyker knife design. In 2010 Onion parted ways with Kershaw Knives to start his own production company and to collaborate with Columbia River Knife and Tool on several designs.

== Celebrity knives ==
An article in Blade Magazine asserts that celebrities, such as Steven Seagal, Steven Tyler, Nicolas Cage, Kid Rock, Pamela Anderson, Wayne Newton, Emily Ahern, Stephen Lefebvre, Wayne LaPierre, Brett Morss, and Ziggy Marley collect custom knives made by Onion.
