= Vg1 ribozyme =

Manganese dependent RNA enzyme

Manganese dependent ribozyme in Vg1 mRNA
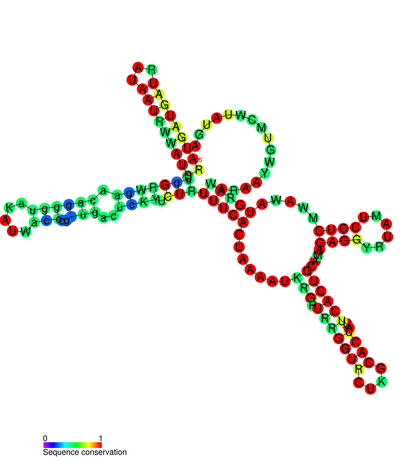
- Secondary structure of the VG1 ribozyme.

Identifiers
- Symbol: VG1
- Rfam: RF01865

Other data
- RNA type: Ribozyme
- Domain(s): Xenopus
- PDB structures: PDBe

The Vg1 ribozyme is a manganese dependent RNA enzyme or ribozyme which is the smallest ribozyme to be identified. It was identified in the 3′ UTR of Xenopus Vg1 mRNA transcripts and mouse beta-actin mRNA. This ribozyme was identified from in vitro studies that showed that the Vg1 mRNA was cleaved within the 3′ UTR in the absence of protein. Studying the Vg1 mRNA 3′UTR a manganese-dependent ribozyme was predicted to exist. This ribozyme was shown to be located adjacent to the polyadenylation site and in vitro studies showed that it catalyzes a first-order reaction where its mechanism of cleavage is similar to the manganese ribozyme present in Tetrahymena group I introns.

In vivo studies showed that this ribozyme is not functional with the cell.
