= VG =

VG, vg or v.g. may refer to:

== Arts and media ==
- VG-lista, a Norwegian music chart
- Vanguard: Saga of Heroes, a 2007 fantasy video game
- Variable Geo, a 1990s erotic video game series
- Verdens Gang, a Norwegian newspaper (founded 1945)
- Victory Gundam, a 1993 anime series
- Video game
- Világgazdaság, a Hungarian business newspaper (1969–2022)

== Aviation ==
- VG Airlines, a defunct Belgian airline
- Air Siam (1965–1976, IATA code VG)
- VLM Airlines (1993–2018, IATA code VG)
- Vonage (NYSE stock symbol VG)
- Variable geometry, a wing/aircraft configuration

== Military ==
- Volksgrenadier, the designation of some German infantry units in World War II
- VG (nerve agent), the NATO designation for a chemical weapon agent, a.k.a. Amiton

== Places ==
- British Virgin Islands
  - ISO 3166-2:VG
- Victoria Gardens (Rancho Cucamonga), a market in California, US

== Religion ==
- Vicar general, the principal deputy of a Christian bishop
- Virgin (Vg), following the name of a Christian saint

== Science and technology ==
=== Biology ===
- Vein of Galen, two blood vessels in the cerebrum
- Vestigial wings, a gene in Drosophila melanogaster genetics
- Viral Genome, a unit used indicate concentration of Viral vector in Gene Therapy, usually a ratio to weight

=== Chemicals ===
- VG (nerve agent), the NATO designation for a chemical weapon agent, a.k.a. Amiton
- Vegetable glycerine, otherwise known as glycerol
- Viscosity grade, hydraulic oil viscosities under ISO VG (Viscosity Grade) classification system

=== Computing ===
- .vg, the country code top-level domain for the British Virgin Islands
- Voice grade category 3 cable
- Volume group, an administrative unit of storage volumes in logical volume manager (LVM) in Linux computer operating system

=== Other technologies ===
- Nissan VG engine, a car engine built by Nissan
- Vortex generator, an aerodynamic surface on wind turbines and vehicles
- Volcanic glass, a material

== Other uses ==
- VG (shop), a now-defunct chain of retail stores in the United Kingdom
- Verbi gratia (v. g.), equivalent to e.g.
- Very good condition (VG), in bookselling
- Vice Ganda (born 1976), Filipino actor and comedian
- Vinstri Græn, (Left-Green Party) Icelandic eco-socialist party
