= Kershaw Knives =

American knife manufacturer

Kershaw Knives/Kai USA Ltd.
- Type: Corporation
- Industry: Manufacturing
- Founded: Portland, Oregon; 1974; 52 years ago
- Headquarters: Tualatin, Oregon
- Key people: Jack Igarashi, Chief of North American Operations, Kai USA ltd., Pete Kershaw, Founder
- Products: Knives
- Number of employees: 430
- Website: https://www.kaiusaltd.com

Kershaw Knives designs, sources and manufactures a wide range of knives, including pocketknives, sporting knives, and kitchen cutlery. Kershaw is a brand of Kai USA Ltd., a member of the KAI Group, headquartered in Tualatin, Oregon, United States.

== History ==
Kershaw Knives was started in Portland, Oregon in 1974 when knife salesman Pete Kershaw left Gerber Legendary Blades to form his own cutlery company based on his own designs. Early manufacturing was primarily done in Japan by Ichiro Hattori in Seki.

In 1977, Kershaw became a wholly owned subsidiary of the KAI Group.

In 1997 the U.S. production facility was opened in Wilsonville, Oregon. Due to an expanding market, the facilities were moved to a larger production site in 2003 located in Tualatin, Oregon. Other products are imported from Japanese and Chinese factories.

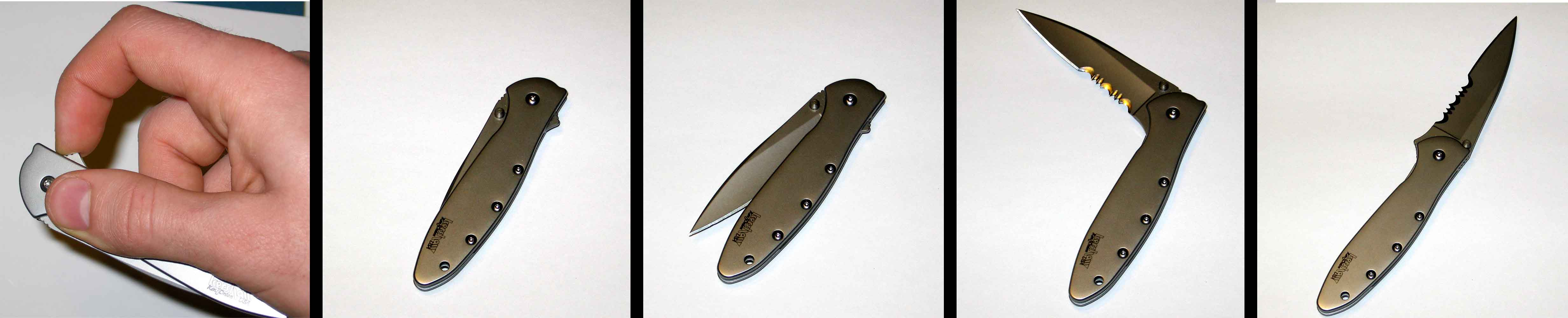
A Kershaw Leek Assisted-opening knife in action.

On 28 December 1998, the USPTO granted and published U.S. patent 6,006,385 for inventors Peter G. Kershaw, Douglas B. Flagg, Craig Green and Katsumi Hasegawa. The patent was filed on 24 January 1997 by Kai USA Ltd, who was also the assignee for the duration of its 20-year life span.

In 2002, Kershaw released a Steven Seagal model featuring stingray leather on the handle.

In May 2005, Kai USA Ltd. won four of the top awards at the Blade Show in Atlanta, Georgia. This was the first time in the show's history that one company won this number of awards in one year: 2005 Overall Knife of the Year, 2005 Most Innovative American Design, 2005 Kitchen Knife of the Year, and 2005 Knife Collaboration of the Year.

In June 2007, Kai USA won the Blade Show's "Overall Knife of the Year Award" with the Kershaw "Tyrade" (model 1850), in which the company's patent-pending Composite Blade technology using two different steels in the same blade was introduced. The blade steels were D2 tool steel at the cutting edge, and a spine of 154CM stainless steel.

In 2009 Kershaw won an award for the Speedform (model 3500).

In 2010, Kershaw won "American Made Knife of the Year" for the Tilt (model 4001) and Shun won "Kitchen Knife of the Year" for the Shun Premier line.

In the 2011 Blade Show, Zero Tolerance's 0777 won "Overall Knife of the Year," the ZT-Rick Hinderer 0560/0561 won "Collaboration of the Year," and the Shun Fuji line won "Kitchen Knife of the Year".

Then in 2012, Kai USA Ltd. repeated its four-win sweep of the Blade Show awards. The Zero Tolerance 0888 won "Overall Knife of the Year", while the 0600 won for "Collaboration of the Year". The Kershaw Cryo won 2012's "Best Buy of the Year" and the Shun Taiyo was the 2012 "Kitchen Knife of the Year."

== Products ==
Kai USA Ltd. has three lines of products; Kershaw Knives brand of sporting and pocketknives, Shun Cutlery, handcrafted Japanese kitchen cutlery, and Zero Tolerance, a line of premium and professional knives.

Kai USA Ltd. holds more than 150 patents from the USPTO.

Kershaw has collaborated with custom knife makers including Hall of Fame knife maker Ken Onion on Kershaw's SpeedSafe knives, Ernest Emerson, Grant and Gavin Hawk, Frank Centofante, Rick Hinderer and RJ Martin.

- Kershaw Knives: Pocketknives and sporting knives designed for everyday use, camping, hunting and fishing
- Zero Tolerance Knives: Premium knives developed in loose collaboration with custom knife makers for the law enforcement and military markets.
- Shun Cutlery: Handcrafted kitchen cutlery
- Kai Housewares: Kitchen cutlery and household products
- Priyanka India Pvt. Ltd.: Stainless Steel Kitchen cutlery and household products

== In popular culture ==
In the television show Person of Interest, the character John Reece (played by Jim Caviezel) is frequently seen using a Kershaw Blur.

In the television series NCIS, the character Leroy Jethro Gibbs (played by Mark Harmon) is seen frequently using a Zero Tolerance ZT0301 with Tiger Stripes.

In the television series Bizarre Foods with Andrew Zimmern, the host Andrew Zimmern is frequently seen using a Kershaw Leek.

== See also ==
- List of companies based in Oregon
