= VG-10 =

Stainless steel grade optimized for cutlery

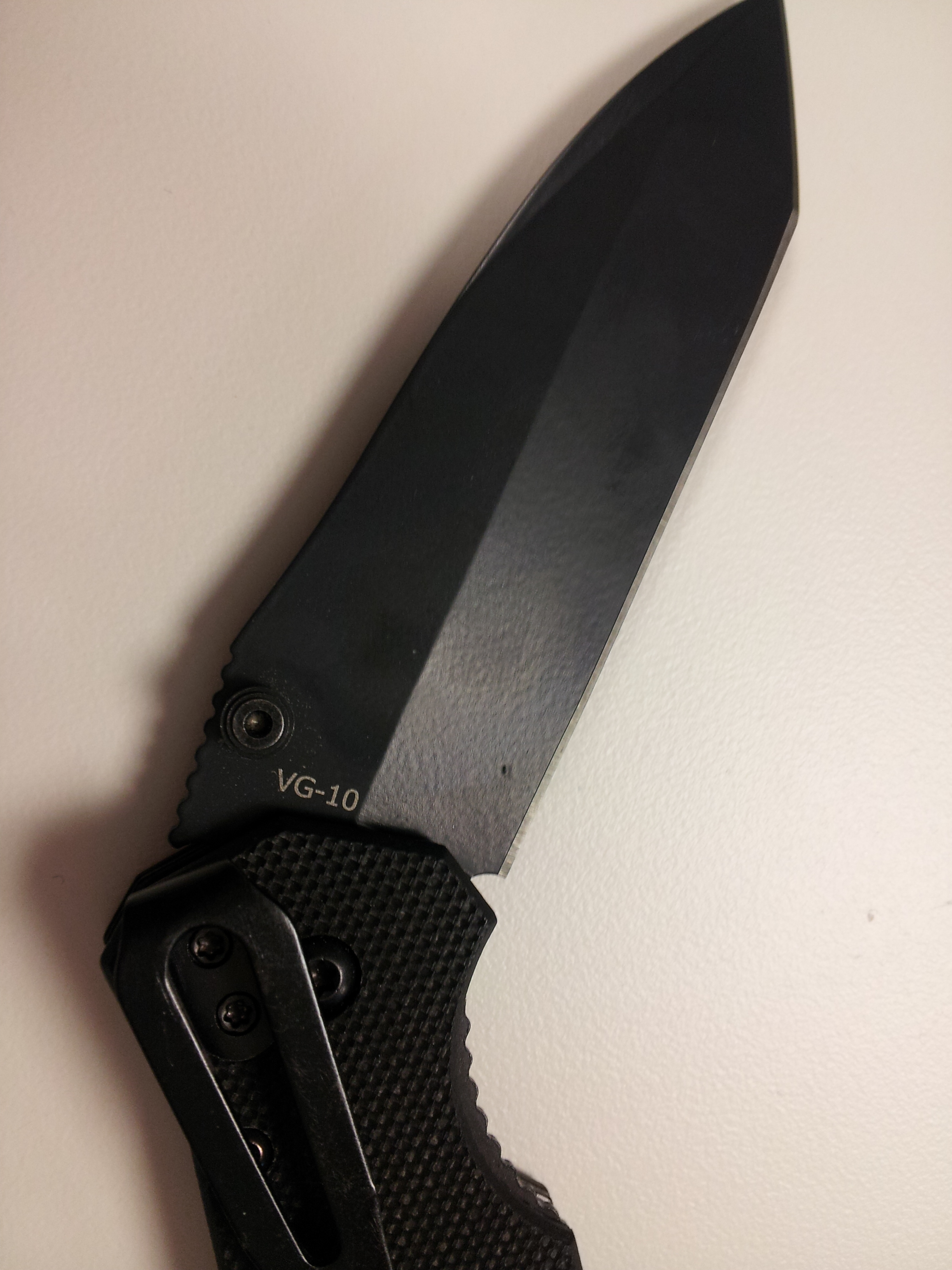
Camillus tanto folder with "Titanium Carbonitride" coated VG10 blade

VG-10 is a cutlery-grade stainless steel produced in Japan. The name stands for V Gold 10 ("gold" meaning quality), or sometimes V-Kin-10 (V金10号) (kin means "gold" in Japanese). Like various other blade steels, it is a stainless steel with a high carbon content, containing 1% carbon, 15% chromium, 1% molybdenum, 0.2% vanadium, and 1.5% cobalt.

The VG-10 stainless steel was originally designed by Takefu Special Steel Co. Ltd., based in Takefu, Fukui Prefecture, Japan (the former cutlery/sword-making center of Echizen). Takefu also made another version: VG10W, which contains 0.4% tungsten. Almost all VG-10 steel knife blades were manufactured in Japan.

VG-10 was originally aimed at Japanese chefs, but also found its way into sports cutlery.
