= SOG Knife =

Knife used by US armed forces

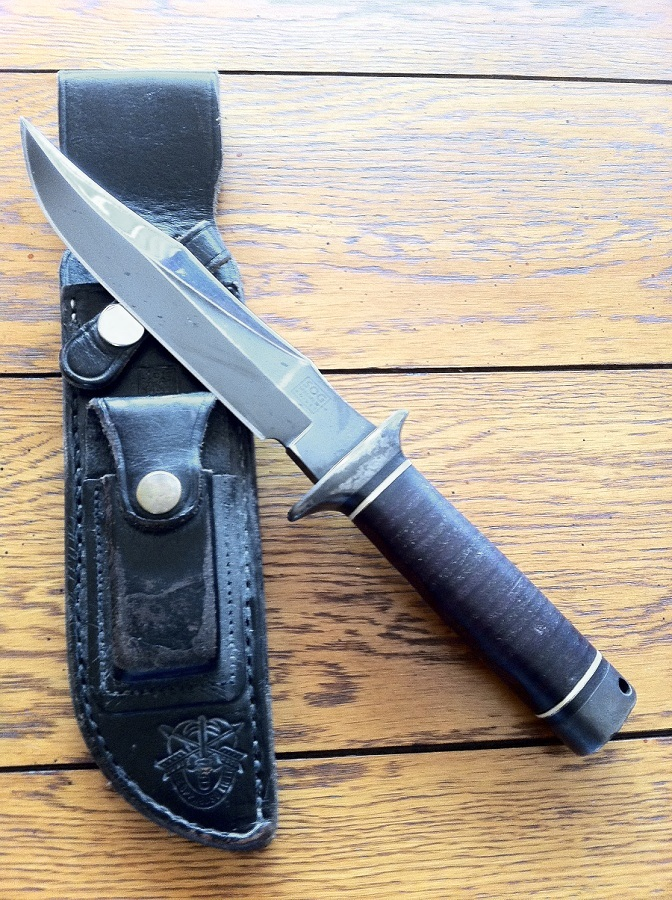
- A SOG Knife with its sheath
- Type: Combat knife
- Place of origin: United States

Service history
- Wars: Vietnam War

Production history
- Manufacturer: Various

The SOG Knife was designed for, and issued to, covert Studies and Observations Group personnel during the Vietnam War.

== Design ==
The SOG Knife was designed by Benjamin Baker, the Deputy Chief of the U.S. Counterinsurgency Support Office (CISO).

A chrome-moly steel known as SKS-3 was chosen for the blade and hardened to a Rockwell hardness of 55-57.

The blade pattern featured a convex false edge on the clip point of a Bowie knife.

The stacked leather handle was inspired by a Marbles Gladstone Skinning Knife made in the 1920s owned by Baker, into which finger grooves were molded.

The blade was typically parkerized or blackened to reduce glare. This was done so by applying a dark gun-blue finish (similar to those used on guns) on this SK-3 carbon steel knife.

The knife was carried in a leather sheath which contained a sharpening steel or whetstone.

== Usage ==
The SOG Knife was unmarked and supposedly untraceable to country of origin or manufacture in order to maintain plausible deniability of covert operators in the event of their death or capture.

Original models are extremely valuable collector's items among both knife and militaria collectors. The later replicas are also in high demand by collectors, especially the early ones made in Seki.

== Manufacturing ==
The first contract was awarded to Japanese Trading Company Yogi Shokai, Okinawa for 1,300 seven-inch blades designated "Knife, indigenous, RECON, 7 in (180 mm) blade, w/scabbard & whetstone" at $9.85 each.

In 1966, SOG ordered 1,200 sterile knives with six-inch blades and black sheaths and in March of the following year an additional lot of 3,700 was ordered.

This second lot was serial numbered for accountability purposes and was designated "Knife, indigenous, hunting, 6 in (150 mm) blade, w/black sheath and whetstone".

Further knives were ordered from Japan Sword, Tokyo as well.

The orders were actually fulfilled by a number of knifemakers and as a result, the various lots had minor differences such as blade bluing color and guard color or shape.

Although the SOG office based at Kadena and Yogi Shokai were in Okinawa, it is believed that only a major knifemaking source like Seki could have fulfilled all these orders.

The S1 and S2 knives were manufactured by Hattori of Seki under contract to SOG Knives USA from 1986 to 2005, after which SOG shifted to manufacturing in Taiwan.

Hattori also manufactured the three commemorative SOG bowies for Boker, for sale in the European market.

SOG also contracted with Kinryu Co. Ltd of Seki Japan to manufacture the Recon Bowie and the Scuba Demo until 2007. None of these knives are currently in official use by any branch of the US Military.

== Variants ==
Replicas of the SOG knife have also been made by Al Mar Knives, Ek Knives, Tak Fukuta for Parker, and Strider Knives.

=== S1 Bowie ===
In 1986, a company named SOG Specialty Knives based in Santa Monica, California marketed a knife manufactured in Seki City, Japan very similar to the original SOG knife.

The S1 Bowie had a blued SK5 carbon steel blade, was marked with the US Army Special Forces Crest.

The S1 Bowie was a replica of the commemorative versions of the original MACV-SOG knives, rather than the actual sterile unmarked knives used in combat.

=== SOG S2 Trident ===
SOG variant with an Aus8 stainless steel blade and black micarta handle in commemoration of the U.S. Navy SEALs.

=== Recon Bowie ===
Equipped with a distinctive banana-shaped 7 in (180 mm) blade. This type of knife was actually the first to go into service in Vietnam.

=== SCUBA/Demo ===
Introduced in 2001, it is the rarest knife in this group as only one true original is reported to exist.

It was created for and assigned to the USN Advisory Detachment, which operated coastal gunboats.

== Users ==
- United States

== See also ==
- M9 bayonet
- Strider SMF
- Commander (knife)
- SARK
- CQC-6
- Sebenza
- Umnunzaan
- Mark 3 knife
- Aircrew Survival Egress Knife
- OKC-3S Bayonet
- KA-BAR
