= Bill Harsey Jr. =

American knifemaker and designer

William W. Harsey
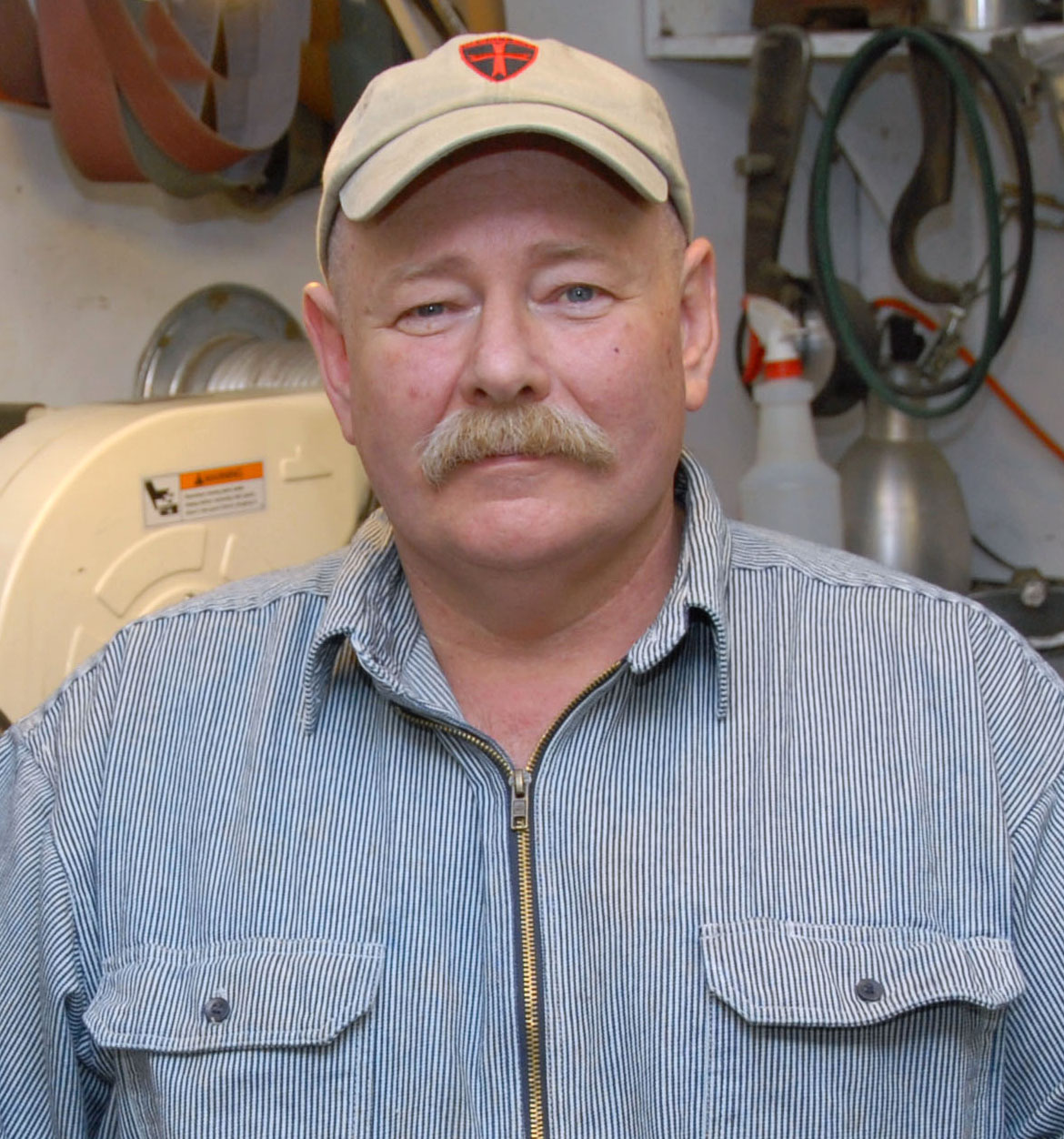
- Born: Oregon, United States
- Occupations: Knife designer, custom knife maker

William Harsey Jr. (born 1955) is an American knifemaker and designer who works with several knife companies, including Gerber Legendary Blades, Lone Wolf Knives, Spartan Blades, Ruger/CRKT, Fantoni, and Chris Reeve Knives.

== Personal history ==
Harsey was born into a logging family in Oregon in 1955. He received a BFA from the University of Oregon.

== Work in the knife industry ==
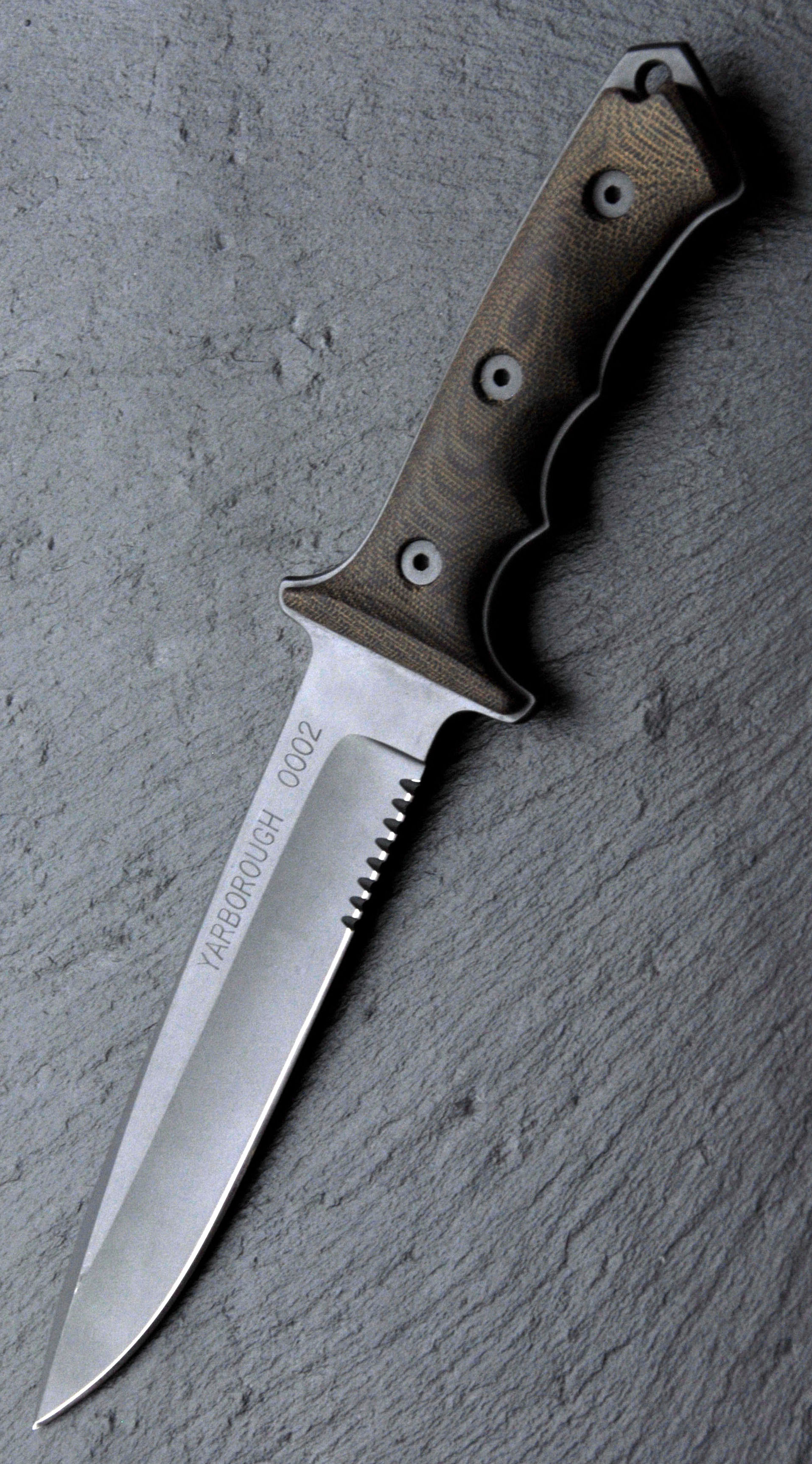
"The Yarborough", presented to each graduate of the United States Army Special Forces Qualification Course. This knife with serrations was designed and built by Bill Harsey in collaboration with Chris Reeve Knives.

Harsey is a custom knife maker, designing and crafting one-of-a-kind folding and fixed blade knives, often to order. In Battle Blades, author Greg Walker identifies Harsey as producing superb edges and blade finishes on his knives, as well as making knives specifically for Al Mar and Colonel Rex Applegate. Even so, he is best known for his collaboration projects, in which he serves as knife designer for various knife companies.

Harsey collaborated with Colonel Rex Applegate to design Gerber's Applegate-Fairbairn line. He worked with Chief James Watson to design Gerber's Watson/Harvey Silver Trident and worked with Chris Reeve and Matt Larsen to design the LHR Combat Knife. Harsey designed the Neil Roberts Warrior Knife, which is dedicated to the memory of Petty Officer First Class Neil Roberts, who was killed in action Afghanistan in 2002 and the Pacific / First Group Knife, commemorating the 50th anniversary of the U.S. Army Special Forces in Asia.

One of Harsey's most significant designs was that of the Yarborough Knife, which is named after Lt. Gen. William P. Yarborough, known as the "father of modern Special Forces.". The Yarborough Knife is presented at the beginning in August 2002 to each graduate of the United States Army Special Forces Qualification Course, with each of these knives possessing its own serial number, and logged in an official record book maintained by the United States Army Special Operations Command. The honor of the Yarborough Knife has become nearly equivalent to that of the Green Beret. To quote the USASOC News Service, "As each Green Beret crosses the stage upon graduation of the SFQC, he receives a legacy of the Brotherhood of Special Forces, signing in the pages of an illustrious history, shared by a select few. Only a few short years after its conception, the honor of the Yarborough Knife has now become almost as large of a part of the heritage and tradition of Special Forces as the Green Beret, and has been shared with a small number of dignitaries such as President George W. Bush.".

== Industry awards ==
- 1996 International Blade Show "American Made Knife of the Year" ("Applegate Fairbairn Combat Folder", designed by Harsey and manufactured by Gerber Legendary Blades)
- 2003 International Blade Show "Collaboration Knife of the Year" ("The Green Beret Knife", designed by Harsey and manufactured by Chris Reeve Knives)
- 2004 Field and Stream Magazine "Best of the Best" Award ("Harsey Tactical Ranger Folder", designed by Harsey and manufactured by Lone Wolf Knives)
- 2007 International Blade Show "American Made Knife of the Year" ("The Pacific Knife", designed by Harsey and manufactured by Chris Reeve Knives)
- 2008 Field and Stream Magazine "Best of the Best" Award ("The Pacific Knife")
- 2010 International Blade Show "Collaboration of the Year" with Spartan Blades, LLC
- 2010 USASOC Sniper Vendor Competition Winner
- 2016 International Blade Show "American Made Knife of the Year"
