= Zero Tolerance Knives =

Knife brand from Kai USA

- Industry: Manufacturing
- Founded: 2006; 20 years ago
- Headquarters: Tualatin, Oregon
- Key people: Jack Igarashi, Chief of North American Operations
- Products: Knives
- Website: https://zt.kaiusaltd.com/

Zero Tolerance Knives (ZT Knives) is a knife brand of Kai USA, headquartered in Tualatin, Oregon, United States. Both Zero Tolerance and Kai USA are members of the Kai Group, a global cutlery company.

== History ==
The first ZT knives were produced in 2006 alongside Kai USA's longstanding, Kershaw Knives brand. The original line of ZT knives included collaborations between custom knifemaker Ken Onion and Strider Knives. Early products were combat knives, but Zero Tolerance later expanded its market to include more general use knives. All ZT products are manufactured in Kai USA's Tualatin, Oregon facility.

=== Awards ===
Over the course of the brand's history, eight individual Zero Tolerance knives have won awards at the annual Blade Show in Atlanta, Georgia. The following models have received recognition:

Year	Model	Designer	Award
2006	Model 0500	Grant and Gavin Hawk	Most Innovative American Design of the Year Award
2011	Model 0777	Kai Original Design	Overall Knife of the Year Award
2011	Model 0560/0561	Rick Hinderer	Collaboration of the Year Award
2012	Model 0888	Kai Original Design	Overall Knife of the Year Award
2012	Model 0600	R.J. Martin	Collaboration of the Year Award
2013	Model 0454	Dmitry Sinkevich	Overall Knife of the Year Award
2014	Model 0562CF	Rick Hinderer	American Made Knife of the Year Award
2015	Model 0999	Kai Original Design	American Made Knife of the Year Award

== Products ==
The ZT 0566BW was designed by Rick Hinderer.

Zero Tolerance Knives manufactures USA-made folding knives and fixed blades. The brand has worked with custom knife makers such as Les George, Jens Anso, Dmitry Sinkevich, Todd Rexford, Rick Hinderer, R.J. Martin, Tim Galyean, Grant and Gavin Hawk, Ken Onion, and Gus T. Cecchini. ZT Knives has also collaborated with Emerson Knives.
