= Umnumzaan =

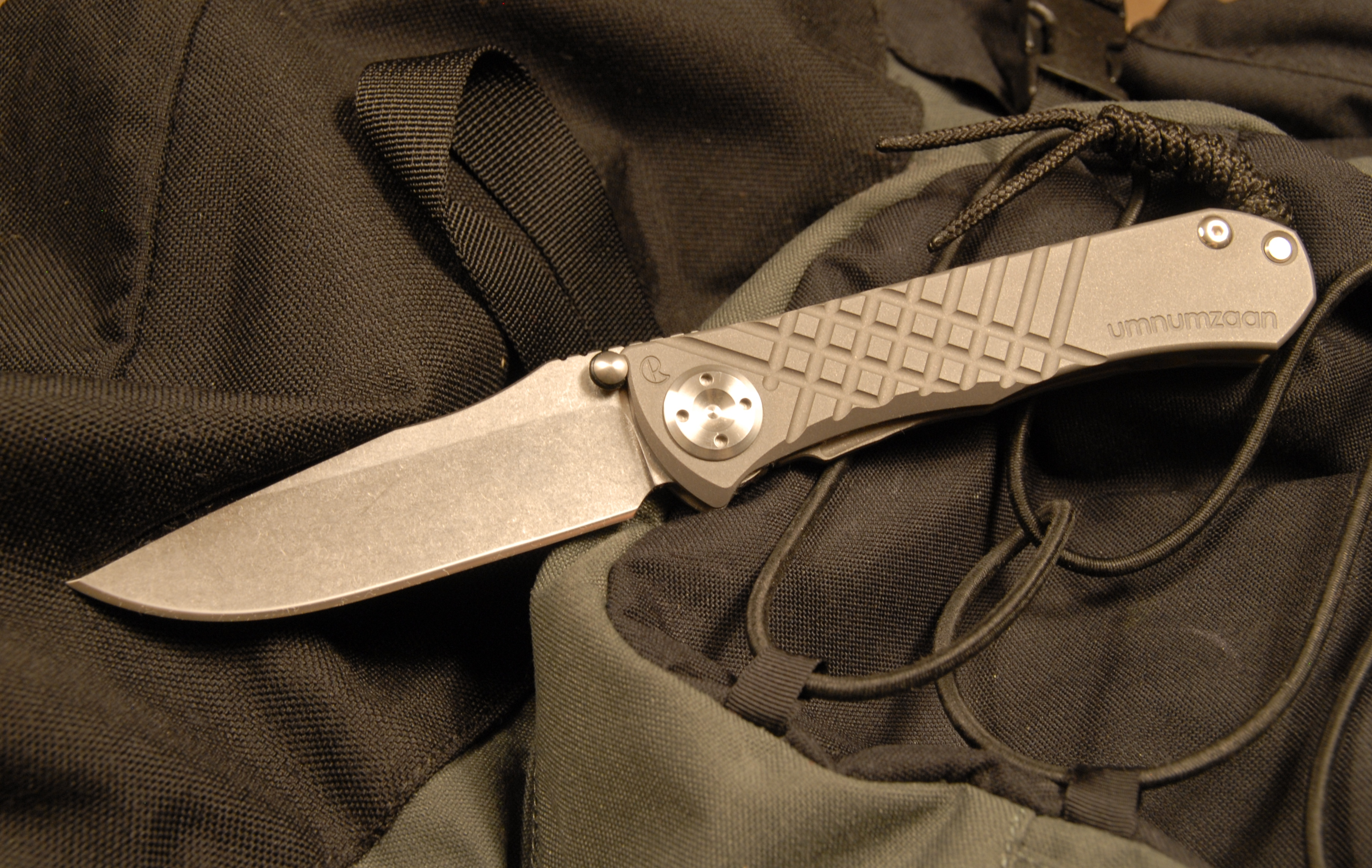
- A 1 of 20 prototype Umnumzaan folding knife, with CPM S30V blade and titanium handles
- Type: Folding knife
- Place of origin: United States

Production history
- Designer: Chris Reeve
- Manufacturer: Chris Reeve Knives
- Variants: Tanto Umnumzaan, Wilson Combat Umnumzaan

The Umnumzaan (Zulu: boss, lit. 'head of the family') is a folding pocket knife manufactured by Chris Reeve Knives of Boise, Idaho, and designed by Chris Reeve.

== Name ==
Although it is reported that the name "Umnumzaan" is derived from the Zulu language, meaning "Head of the family," or "Boss" (colloq.), a tribute to Mr. Reeve's South Africa origins, a Google translation from Zulu to English suggests that the word's meaning is "messenger". A related South African word "umnumzana" does mean "a lesser chief, usually the headman of a village". ref: https://dsae.co.za/entry/umnumzana/e07483

== Usage ==
The Umnumzaan was designed to meet the needs of operators seeking a heavy-duty folder capable of handling heavy use and even abuse.

== Design ==
=== Blade ===
The Umnumzaan blade pivot is implemented with a pivot screw and pin, and is supported by perforated phosphor bronze thrust washers.

The functions of the perforations are to reduce friction due to a reduction in surface area relative to that of a solid washer, and to increase the duration of use between cleanings by housing lubricant in the perforations.

Over the life of the Umnumzaan, the pivot and washers have been incrementally modified.

While not made at any specific point of revision, like other Chris Reeve Knives that had used CPM-S30V stainless blade steel, the Umnumzaan saw a blade steel phase to CPM-S35VN.

While similar to S30V, S35VN is an incremental improvement in which Vanadium is used to make sharpening easier and increase toughness and Niobium to increase toughness and further refine uniform grain formation.

Rockwell Hardness is still at 58-59 HRC and edge retention is not much different from S30V. This change was made progressively as S30V blade supply was exhausted.

=== Integral lock ===
The Umnumzaan implements a version of the Chris Reeve Integral Lock.

The original Integral Lock (sometimes referred to as the “frame lock” or“titanium frame lock”) developed by Reeve in 1987, was first implemented in the Sebenza folding pocket knife. This lock employs a titanium lock bar, milled out of the knife's handle material.

At lock up, the titanium lock bar comes in direct contact with the back of the blade, thus locking the blade in the open position. The Umnumzaan Integral Lock utilizes a ceramic ball that serves two functions.

The ball acts as the interface between the blade locking surface and the integral locking arm as the knife assumes the open position.

The ball also mates with a detent in the blade in the closed position to secure the blade from opening accidentally.

=== Thumb lug ===
The thumb lug on the Umnumzaan is used for opening the knife blade, as well as serving as the stop pin that contacts the titanium handle slabs upon lockup.

Around each lug is a polyurethane o-ring that acts as a shock absorber to cushion the shock of opening, and reduce the audible noise of opening.

The use of the shock absorber concept was pioneered by knife designers Grant and Gavin Hawk, and is being implemented in the Umnumzaan with their consent.

=== Lanyard joint ===
The Umnumzaan was the first Chris Reeve folding knife to incorporate a lanyard pivot joint, which dramatically reduces the friction wear that over time destroys paracord lanyards.

It also allows easy swapping of lanyards without a need to cut and retie if the owner has multiple lanyard pivots (referred to as a “cord tie bar” by Chris Reeve Knives).

The lanyard pivot joint has since been incorporated on the Sebenza Classic 2000, Sebenza 21, and Sebenza 25.

=== Others ===
The knife also features a glass-breaker, but unlike many other glass-breakers on folding knives, the tip is part of the blade itself which protrudes from the pivot side when the knife is closed.

== Specifications ==
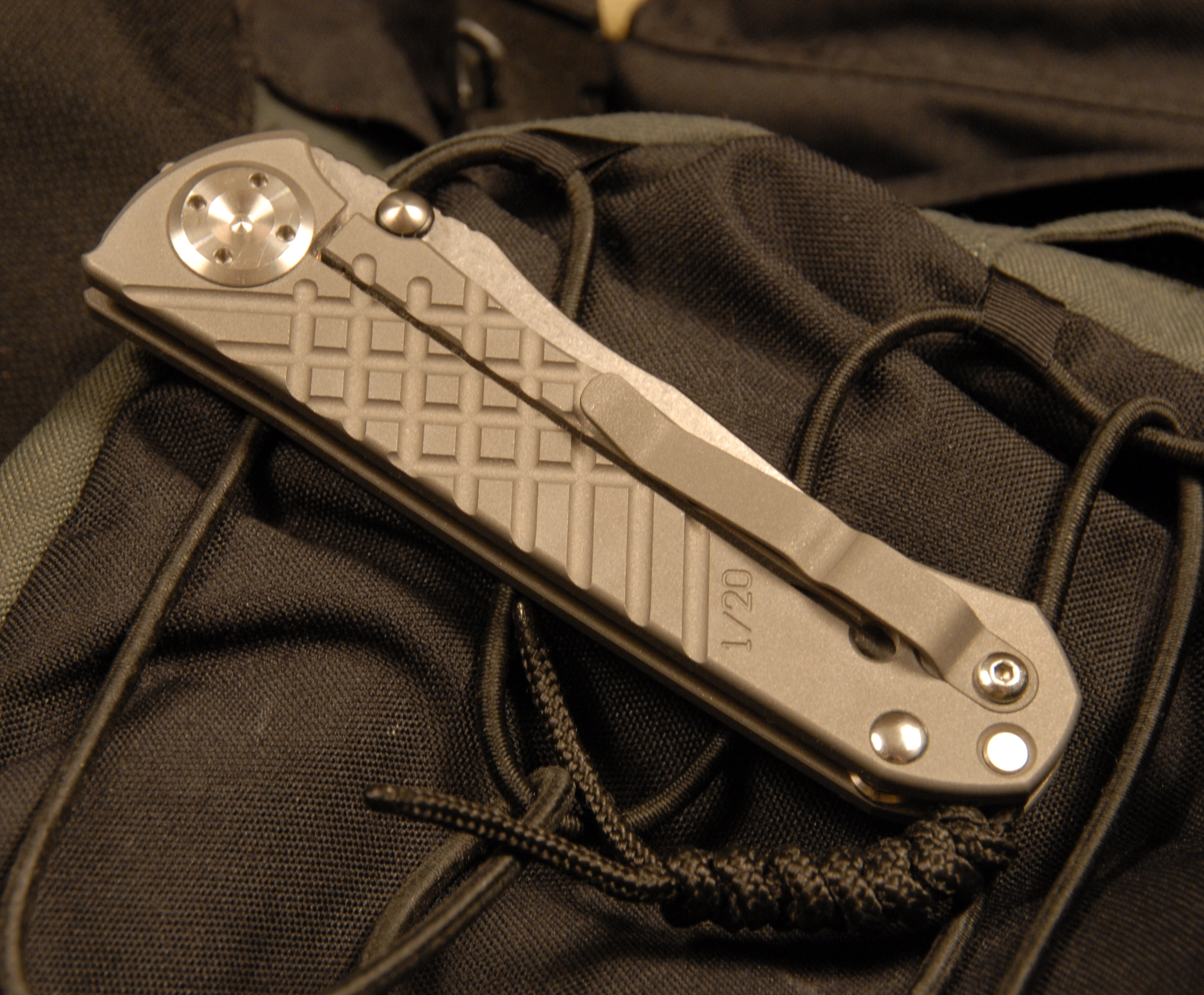
Lock side view, 1 of 20 prototype Umnumzaan folding knife

The specifications of the Umnumzaan are as follows:

Blade material	CPM S30V steel
Blade hardness	58-59 RC
Blade finish	Stonewash
Blade length	3.675 in (93.3 mm)
Blade thickness	0.140 in (3.6 mm)
Handle length	4.77 in (121 mm)
Handle material	6AI4V titanium
Fittings	303 stainless steel

=== Comparison with the Sebenza ===
Building upon the Sebenza’s success, the Umnumzaan features:

- Stronger pivot joint
- Thicker blade
- Different blade grind with a reinforced tip
- Improved ergonomics
- Thicker titanium handles
- Thicker titanium lock bar
- Stronger ceramic ball detent system
- Larger titanium spacer (sometimes called a “stand off”)
- Phosphor-bronze washer system designed to act as a ‘dry-sump’ to retain lubrication and keep dirt out
- Oversized ambidextrous-thumb studs & extended lock bar to aid operation when wearing gloves
- Lanyard pivot joint that uses pivoting lanyard tie bars
- Deeply textured grip

== Variants ==
Since the 2008 introduction, the Umnumzaan has seen several incremental improvements and one generational change. These changes have all been minor and very few visual changes have occurred since initial introduction.

Dating changes and specific points of change is difficult as no single source provides all of the information on the revisions made, and Chris Reeve Knives is known for making frequent small and incremental changes to their knives over periods of years, often as a response to owner feedback and not always with any formal notice.

While many folding knives are available with many different options (for example, blade steels, blade coatings, handle material, handle color, graphic designs, different blade shapes, etc.), the Umnumzaan is largely a ‘what-you-see-is-what-you-get’ knife as there are very few different variants available.

=== Current offerings ===
As for mass-produced variants of the Umnumzaan, only three options exist: the standard Umnumzaan, a Tanto Umnumzaan, and a Wilson Combat Umnumzaan; all are available in right-handed and left-handed configurations.

==== Tanto Umnumzaan ====
The Tanto Umnumzaan looks identical to the standard Umnumzaan other than the blade shape.

==== Wilson Combat Umnumzaan ====
The Wilson Combat Umnumzaan has a significantly different handle pattern.

Commonly labeled the ‘Star Tac’, the Wilson Combat Umnumzaan has a heavily textured design that spans the entire handle, and a different lanyard with a “Wilson Combat” labeled titanium bead.

=== Limited editions ===
When the knife was first produced, a limited edition of 20 Umnumzaans were produced with the word “UMNUMZAAN” and “1 of 20” engraved into the titanium handle.

Two decorated Graphic Umnumzaans shortly followed.

When Chris Reeve changed to S35VN, two Unique Graphic Umnumzaans were made which advertised a ‘mystery steel’. This steel was later revealed to be CPM-S35VN.

=== Functional modifications ===
==== Lock bar changes ====
Around 2011, changes to the lock bar were made to make engaging the lock with one hand easier; through making the bottom portion of the lock bar slightly more flared, which was a common request voiced by owners on various knife forums.

==== Second generation Umnumzaan ====
===== Pivot variant =====
The second generation Umnumzaan saw numerous modifications that utilizes some of the newer technologies found on the Sebenza 25.

The single-most visual change was replacing the oversized custom pivot with a more traditional (Sebenza-style) pivot brushing.

This new pivot no longer requires the Umnumzaan Take-down Tool and instead a traditional hex wrench is all that is needed to disassemble and reassemble the knife.

This pivot is larger than most blade pivot brushing systems and is identical to the one used on the newer Large Sebenza 25 (mid-2012 release and with a pivot that is significantly thicker than the pivot used on the previous Large Sebenza 21).

This pivot also incorporates a newer generation washer system with larger washer perforations, which helps retain lubricating grease better than previous designs, while simultaneously keeping elements out of the pivot system to increase service intervals.

The change in pivot and washers is complemented by the modifications made to the ceramic ball and detent system, in which a larger ceramic ball in a slightly different location is used to make opening smoother and reduce wear (although it is unclear as to exactly when this specific change began).

===== LBS variant =====
Shortly before this generational change, a Lock Bar Stabilizer (or LBS) was added to prevent 'hyperextension' of the titanium lock bar.

While this change is commonly referred to as part of the second generation Umnumzaan, there are a few models made in early-mid 2012 which have both the old pivot brushing and the lock bar stabilizer, although these are relatively rare.

== Accolades ==
The Umnumzaan was introduced at the 2008 Blade Show and International Cutlery Fair, and was named the 2008 Blade Show "Overall Knife of the Year."

== See also ==
- SARK
- CQC-6
- Sebenza
- Strider SMF
- Folding knife
- Commander (knife)
