= NSAR =

NSAR may refer to:

- Nova Scotia Association of Realtors, an association for realtors in the Canadian province of Nova Scotia
- SARK, or NSAR (Navy Search and Rescue), a folding knife designed by Ernest Emerson

== See also ==
- SEC filing
