= Sebenza =

Folding pocket knife

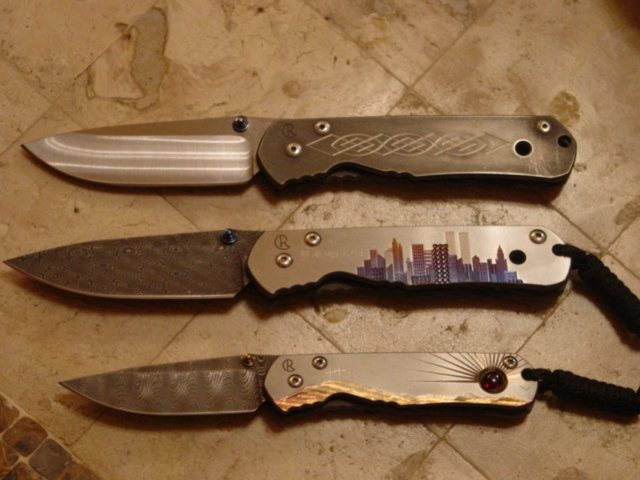
- Three Sebenzas: Large Regular with ATS-34 Steel blade and a Large and Small Regulars featuring Damascus steel blades with computer engraved and anodized handles
- Type: Folding knife
- Place of origin: United States

Production history
- Designer: Chris Reeve
- Manufacturer: Chris Reeve Knives
- Variants: Regular Sebenza, Classic Sebenza, Sebenza 21, Sebenza 25, Sebenza 31

The Sebenza (Zulu: work) is a folding pocket knife manufactured by Chris Reeve Knives of Boise, Idaho.

== Namesake ==
The name Sebenza is derived from the Zulu word meaning "Work," a tribute to Mr. Reeve's South African origins.

== Design ==
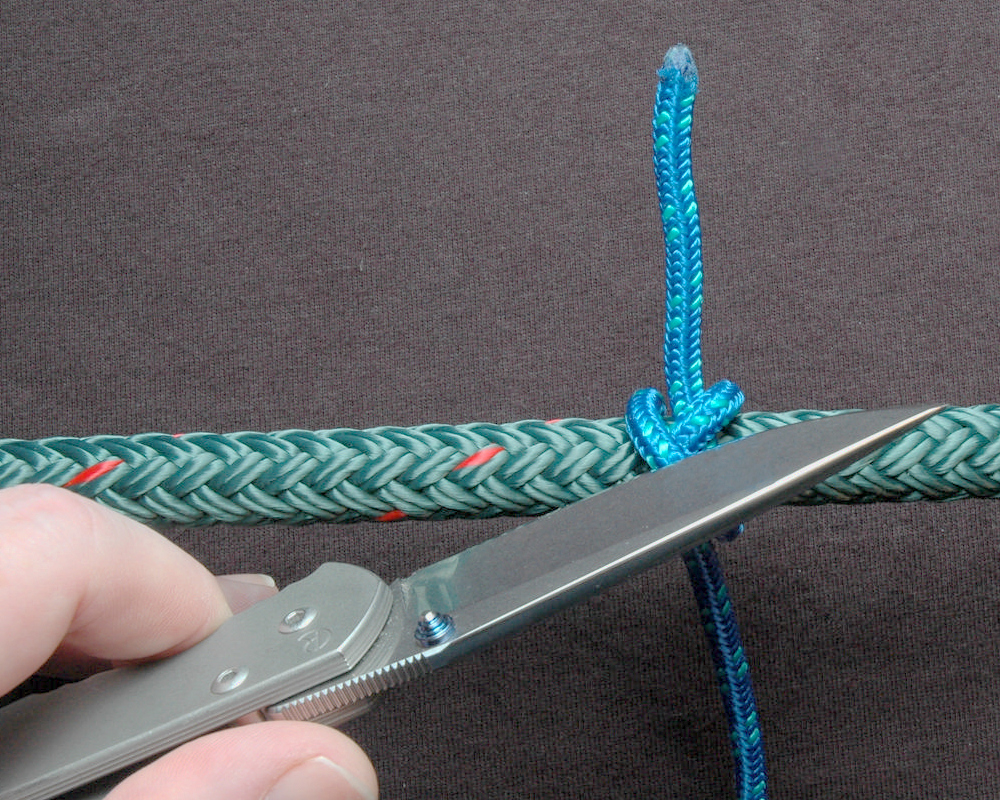
A small Sebenza cutting a knot

There are currently two size models of the Sebenza 31, small and large. The Small 31 has a 2.99" (76.17mm) blade and the Large 31 has a 3.61" (91.69mm) blade.

=== Construction ===
The Sebenza is constructed with a stainless steel blade and titanium handle.

First introduced in 1990, the current basic model has a sand-blasted titanium handle and a stonewashed finish CPM MagnaCut blade.

=== Blade ===
Originally the Chris Reeve Sebenza was available with a blade of ATS-34 steel.

In 1996, the blade material was changed to BG-42 blade steel, and later in 2001, the Sebenza blade material transitioned to CPM S30V steel. CPM S30V was developed by Crucible Steel with the collaboration of Chris Reeve.

Damascus steel blades are also available as an option on the Sebenza.

In 2012, Chris Reeve knives transitioned to CPM S35VN steel.

In 2020, Chris Reeve knives transitioned to CPM S45vn steel, with knives in S45vn shipping in 2021

In January 2023, Chris Reeve knives again changed their standard from S45VN to Magnacut.

=== Handle ===
Sebenza's handle functions as the lock mechanism similar in concept to the Walker linerlock differing in that the handle itself forms the lock bar which holds the blade open. This mechanism was invented by Chris Reeve, and is called the Reeve Integral Lock (R.I.L).

It is also commonly referred to as the Framelock, and is one of the most widely implemented locking systems in the folding knife industry, where lock strength and reliability is a product requirement.

There are numerous options for the embellishment of the Sebenza's titanium handles, such as computer-generated graphics, custom (unique) graphics, or inlays such as exotic wood, micarta, or mammoth ivory.

== Reception ==
A feature of the Sebenza that is highly praised by users is the ease of maintenance, as CRK actually encourages the customer to disassemble and maintain the knife by including a hex wrench, as well as small tube of fluorinated grease (to lubricate the pivot) and a tube of Loctite (for screws) in the box.

Another feature of the Sebenza is the use of a bushing system around the blade's pivot that keeps the blade at a constant tight fit which is always centered.

This bushing allows the user to tighten the pivot screw completely without having to manually adjust the pivot tension.

== Variants ==
=== Regular Sebenza ===
Original model. Discontinued and replaced by the Sebenza 21 in 2008.

=== Classic Sebenza ===
Original model. Discontinued and replaced by the Sebenza 21 in 2008.

=== Sebenza 21 ===
Released in 2008 to commemorate the 21st year of the Sebenza's production; retired in 2019.

The Sebenza 21 is based upon the previous Classic's design, and differs from the Classic only in small details.

=== Sebenza 25 ===
Released in 2012 to commemorate the 25th year of the Sebenza's production.

Significant changes include a more sculpted handle, the introduction of a ceramic ball lockup/detent system and the use of 'Large Hollow Grind Technology" on the blade grind.

The Sebenza 25 was discontinued in mid-2016 and replaced by the Inkosi which shares many similarities with the 25 but with additional refinements.

=== Sebenza 31 ===
Released in 2019 to replace the Sebenza 21, the Sebenza 31 featured minor improvements again, similar to the 25.

Most notably the ceramic lockbar interface and a new inlay design. Additionally, a hole has been removed from the handles, and the pocket clip is slightly offset so that it no longer rests on the lockbar.

== Awards ==
Year	Organization	Award	Model
1987	Knifemaker's Guild of Southern Africa	"Best Folding Knife"	Sebenza predecessor
1993	Knifemakers' Guild	"Most Innovative Folder at the Show"	
2005	Blade Show	"Collector Knife of the Year"	Sebenza 21
2006	Grays Sporting Journal	“Gray's Best” Award	

Knives Illustrated magazine named the industry's top five tactical folders of all time.

== See also ==
- SARK
- CQC-6
- Strider SMF
- Umnumzaan
- Folding knife
- Commander (knife)
