= Strider Knives =

American knife production company

- Type: Private
- Industry: Manufacturing
- Founded: 1997; 29 years ago
- Headquarters: San Marcos, California, US
- Key people: Mick Strider; Duane Dwyer; Josh Lee
- Products: Knives
- Website: www.striderknives.com

Strider Knives, Inc. is a custom and production knifemaking facility headed by Mickey Ray Burger, founded and based in San Marcos, California.

== Materials and design ==
Strider Knives makes folding knives and fixed-blade knives, using metals such as ATS-34, CPM S30V steel, titanium, stellite, beryllium, damascus steel, and BG-42 for the blades. Currently Strider does runs in many premium super steels (CTS-204P, Z-Wear, CTS-40CP, CTS-B75P, CPM-154, CPM-S110V, CPM-3V).

Strider fixed blade knives utilize Steel, Paracord or G-10 fiberglass for the handle material.

Strider uses a proprietary heat treatment originally developed by Paul Bos of Buck Knives. This resulted in knives with blades of ATS-34 or BG-42 coming back from heat treat with a very dark colored blade which would then be bead blasted a flat grey color. After masking a blade before beadblasting, Mick Strider found it resulted in a striping or camouflage effect and it has become a part of the design. As the newest steel Strider uses, CPM S30V does not darken after heat treating, a black oxide coating is applied beforehand.

== Strider folding knives ==
Strider SnG folding knife

After eight years of making fixed blade knives, Strider turned to making folding knives. Strider's goal was to produce a folding knife that was as strong as a fixed blade. To work toward this goal, Strider relied on the use of G10 Fiberglass handles, titanium liners thicker than what was in current use throughout the cutlery industry and an oversized pivot screw 0.19" in diameter. The end results were two linerlocks known as the AR and GB models. Strider makes titanium handled framelock folding knives. These models utilize the handle itself as the locking mechanism and are named the SMF, SnG, PT, and RC models.

== Military models ==
Strider's first project as a company was to supply Naval Special Warfare Group 1 with WB and BG models in 1994. Strider Knives currently makes several models specifically for units of the US Military in the Global War on Terror, each with its own NSN. NATO Stock Numbers are: Strider SMF (officially - Knife, Folding, Special Mission) 1095-01-531-5015, Strider DB-L (officially - Knife, Fixed, Camo) 1095-01-531-5023, the JB1 (officially - Shroud Knife) 1670-09-000-3920, and the Probe Knife 1095-01-503-7231, built for landmine detection.

Strider Knives has designed a new bayonet it hopes to market to the US military. The blade is CPM S30V and it features a tang extending all the way to the latch plate for increased strength. Strider designed the bayonet for Zero Tolerance Knives, which will release it as the ZT Bayonet D9.

Strider Knives has manufactured modern versions of classic military designs such as the V-42 stiletto, the Marine Raider stiletto, the SOG Knife, the USMC Fighting Utility Knife, and the Fairbairn–Sykes fighting knife. These versions have the same profile as the originals, but incorporate modern steel and materials in their designs. The SOG Knife, Marine Raider stiletto, and V-42 stiletto have been used to raise funds for Veteran's Groups associated with those units.

== Collaborations ==
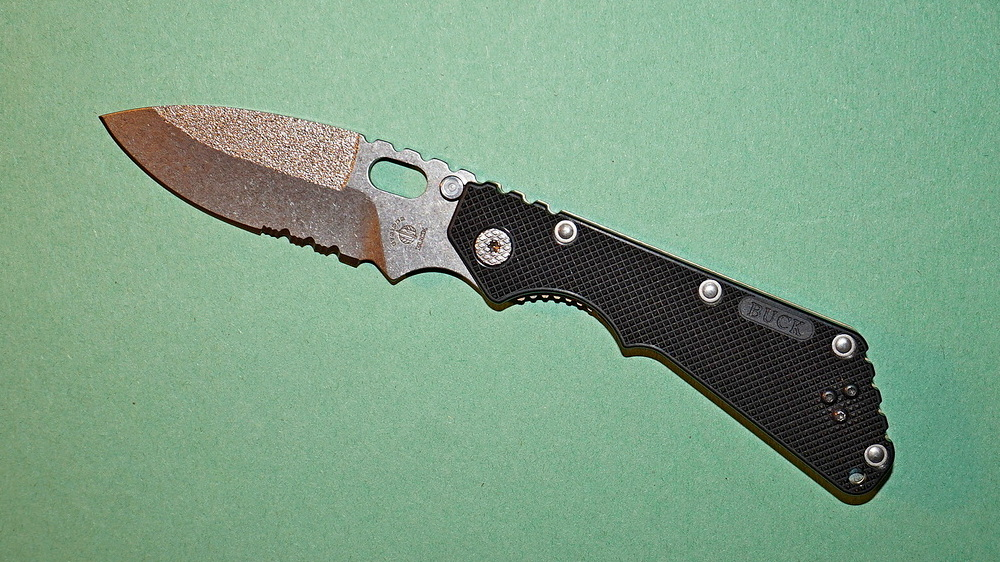
Buck Strider SBT Police Advocate 887

Strider Knives has collaborated with the following companies:

- Buck Knives for a variety of Strider developed knife designs mass-produced at a more affordable price.
- SureFire Flashlights. Strider Knives collaborated with SureFire by making an exclusive SF fixed-blade numbered and marked with the SureFire logo and sold with an identically numbered Strider marked M2CombatLight.
- Unertl Optical Company, Inc. (longtime manufacturer of USMC Scout Sniper Scopes) for a unique SMF knife paired up with each custom 1911 pistol sold.
- Zero Tolerance Knives for Strider joint designs with custom Knifemaker, Ken Onion. A portion of the proceeds from every sale of Zero Tolerance Knives is donated to the Paralyzed Veterans of America. Strider, Ken Onion and Zero Tolerance won Blade Magazine's Publisher's Award for 2006 because of this collaboration.
- Richard Marcinko for the "Rogue Warrior" series of knives named after the author's series of books.
