= SOG Specialty Knives =

US knife manufacturer

SOG Specialty Knives & Tools, LLC
- Type: Limited liability company
- Industry: Manufacturing
- Founded: Santa Monica, California; 1986; 40 years ago
- Headquarters: Irving, Texas, United States
- Key people: Spencer Frazer, Founder & Chief Engineer Gloria Frazer, Founder & C.O.O.
- Products: Knives, rescue tools
- Number of employees: 211
- Website: sogknives.com

SOG Specialty Knives, Inc. (commonly known as SOG) is an American knife and tool manufacturing company famous for their reproduction SOG Knife from the Vietnam era.

SOG manufactures a variety of knives other than the original military inspired designs, many designed for everyday carry (EDC). The company also produces its own line of multi-tools.

== History ==
The company was founded in 1986 by Spencer and Gloria Frazer and was inspired in its choice of name by the Joint Services Special Operations unit known as the Military Assistance Command, Vietnam Studies and Observations Group (MACV-SOG) who developed their own knife during the War in Vietnam.

In December 2021 SOG was acquired by GSM Outdoors. Their factory in Lynnwood, WA was closed.

== SOG Bowie ==
Changes were made to the original design of the MACV SOG Fighter, like resin-impregnating the leather handle, utilizing thicker stock and new grind lines, Spencer and Gloria launched their product and company with a one-page, black and white ad in Soldier of Fortune magazine for the S1 Bowie, a replica of the SOG Knife used by the SOG groups operating in South-East Asia. They also produced the SCUBA/Demo knife, which is a replica of one of the rarest military knives to date (only 1 of the original 39 knives produced has survived till this day). Author Greg Walker considers knives such as these and many of the SOG models produced prior to the shift of production from Seki City, Japan to Taiwan to be the best knives SOG had ever made.

A second "maritime" version of the Bowie (S2) was made utilizing a black micarta handle and stainless steel blade known as the Trident. It was decorated with the US Navy SEAL emblem as opposed to the Special Forces Crest found on the Bowie. The original S1 and S2 classic bowies were manufactured for SOG by Ichiro Hattori of Seki Japan until 2006. The other models were manufactured by Kinryu Corp. also of Seki until 2007.

== SEAL 2000 ==
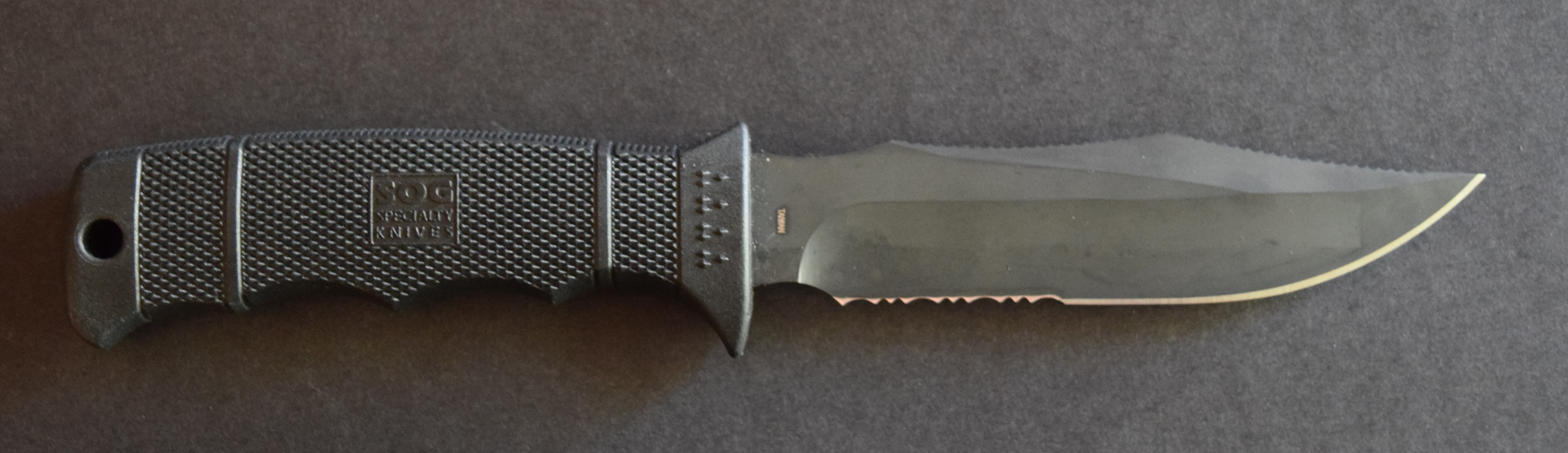
Seal Pup Elite made by SOG Knives

SOG manufactures a knife used by the United States Navy SEALs dubbed the SEAL 2000. The SOG SEAL 2000 is a 7" bladed fixed blade knife with a polymer handle that was designed for the US Navy SEAL knife trials in 1992. The knife was manufactured from 1995 to 2007 for SOG by Kinryu of Seki Japan. Both the Seal 2000 and the smaller version, the Seal Pup are on display in the knife exhibit at the US Navy SEAL Museum in Ft.Pierce, Florida. Two SOG "Seal 2000" knives were used in the 2001 Dartmouth College murders. Scabbards left at the scene were crucial in tracing the killers.

== Multitools, folding knives and modern fixed-blade knives ==
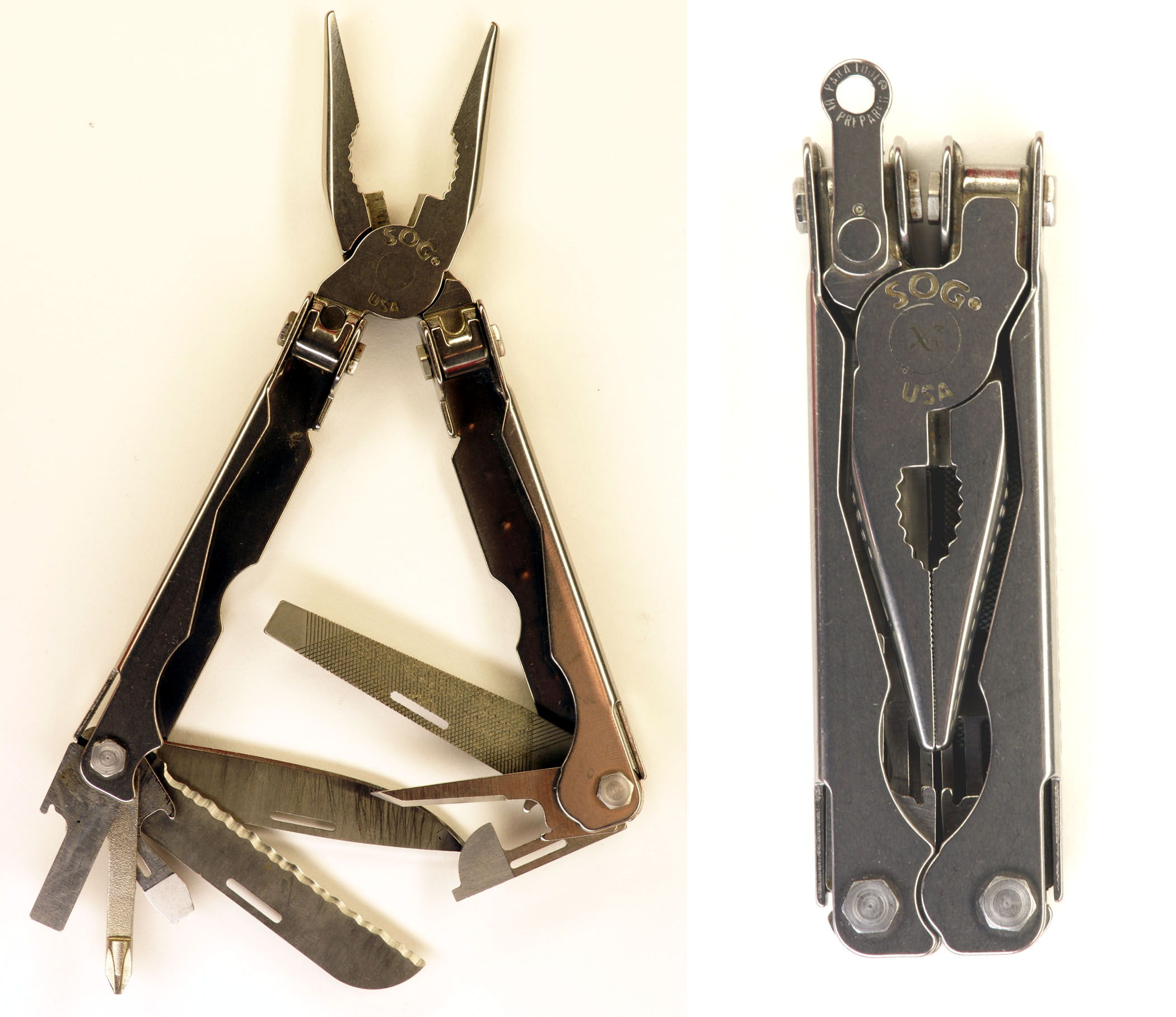
The SOG paratool functions as a pair of pliers and contains fold-out blades and other tools.

SOG Specialty Knives manufactures an array of tools available for military personnel and casual outdoor users. SOG also makes several other military style knives including a tactical switchblade which is only available to military/law enforcement personnel. SOG has developed fixed blade knives for survival and outdoors such as the Tech Bowie as well as folding knives, many of which feature assisted opening technology such as the Aegis, Twitch and Trident. SOG also manufactures multi-tools including the Paratool, PowerLock, and PowerAssist.

Many of SOG's folding knives and multi-tools are made or assembled in the United States, with the higher priced folders being made by G.Sakai in Seki City. The fixed blade models that were originally made in Seki are now made in Taiwan. . Hattori made the S1 and S2 bowies from 1986 to 2006. Kinryu manufactured all of the other fixed blades.Some of SOG's lesser priced tools, such as the Fusion line are manufactured in Taiwan or China.
