= Buck Knives =

American knife manufacturer

- Industry: Manufacturing
- Founded: 1947; 79 years ago, in San Diego, California
- Founder: Hoyt Buck
- Headquarters: Post Falls, Idaho, US
- Key people: Al Buck (former CEO); Chuck Buck, former chairman; CJ Buck (CEO and chairman); Paul Bos
- Products: Knives
- Revenue: US$80 million
- Number of employees: 320
- Website: buckknives.com

Buck Knives is an American knife brand and manufacturer founded in San Diego, California, in 1947 as H.H. Buck and Son, and now located in Post Falls, Idaho. Company founder and family patriarch Hoyt Buck made his first knife in 1902, but did not begin making them commercially until 1947. Since then, the family-owned company has a five-generation history of manufacturing knives and related products (such as sheathes and sharpeners). Buck Knives primarily manufactures sport and field knives and is credited with inventing the "folding hunting knife" and popularizing it to such a degree that the term "buck knife" has become associated with folding lockback knives, including those made by other manufacturers.

== History ==
=== Company origins ===
Hoyt H. Buck became a blacksmith's apprentice in Kansas in 1899 at the age of 10. He learned to make knives and at 13, in 1902, developed a method to heat-treat steel for hoes and other tools so that they would hold an edge longer. He began to make a limited number of knives by hand, using worn-out file blades as raw material. Collectors call these early knives "four strikes," because each of the letters in BUCK was struck with an individual letter stamp. In 1961, marking was replaced by a one-piece stamp. Hoyt left Kansas in 1907 for the American northwest and eventually enlisted in the United States Navy.

Although Hoyt Buck had made those first knives in 1902, he had "never really been in the knife business". When the United States entered World War II, the government asked the public for donations of fixed-bladed knives to arm the troops. Upon learning that there were not enough knives for soldiers, Buck bought an anvil, forge, and grinder to set up a blacksmith shop in the basement of his church in Mountain Home, Idaho, where he was pastor of the Assembly of God. Hoyt later explained, "I didn't have any knives [to offer], but I sure knew how to make them".

After World War II, Hoyt moved in with his son, Al, in San Diego, and set up shop as "H.H. Buck & Son" in 1947. These early knives were handmade and more expensive than a typical mass-produced knife. Hoyt Buck made 25 knives a week until his death in 1949. In the 1950s, the company began manufacturing on a much larger scale and marketed through dealers as opposed to direct mail.

In spite of the high quality of his products, Al Buck struggled to make a business go. A large step forward was taken on April 7, 1961, when articles of incorporation were filed, according to Popular Mechanics in an extensive 2001 article on the Buck knife and its history, "the true beginning of the modern era" of the company.

=== The Model 110 ===
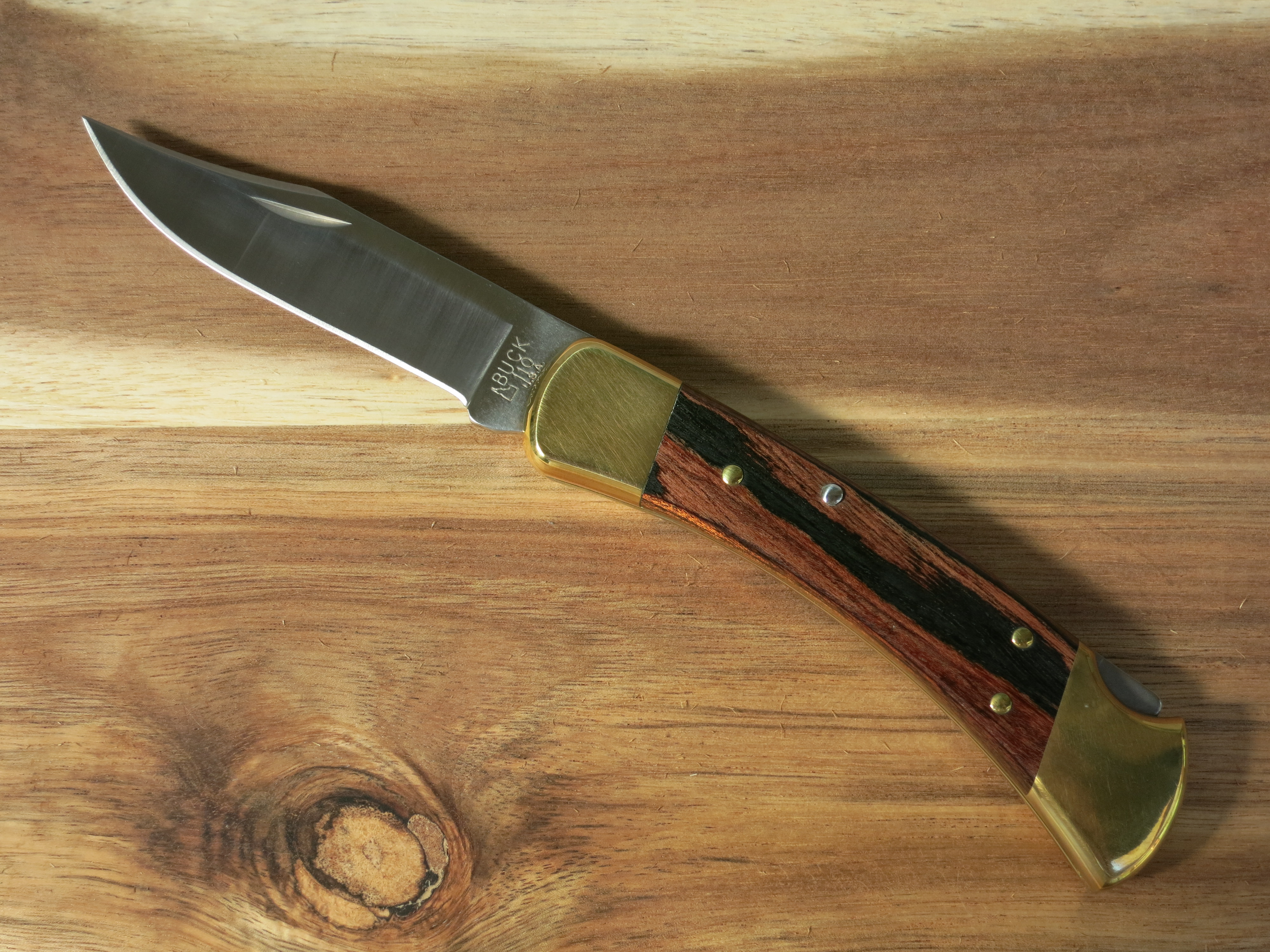
The Buck Model 110 Folding Hunter

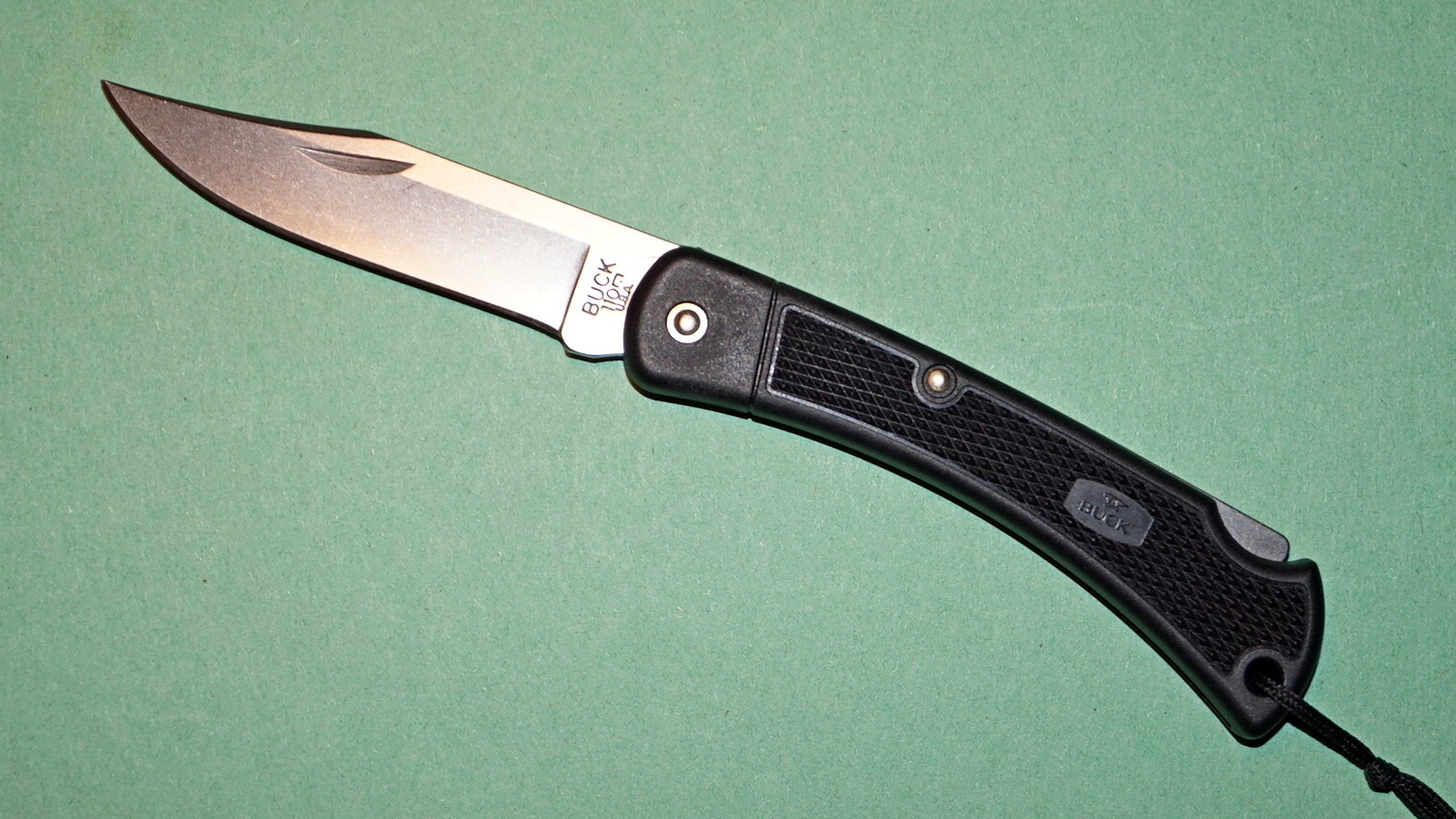
Buck 110 LT (FRN handle)

On April 18, 1963, two years after incorporating, the Buck board of directors authorized development of a new folding utility and hunting knife. The new design featured a sturdy locking mechanism and a substantial clip point blade suitable for butchering and skinning large game. This became the famous Buck Model 110 Folding Hunter.

Introduced in 1964, the Buck Model 110 has a 3 3/4–inch blade, a high-tension lock, and a low-pressure release; the handles are typically wood with bolsters of heavy-gauge brass. In addition to its ergonomics, convenience, and handsome looks, fundamental to the 110's success was that it was one of the first lockback folding knives considered strong enough to do the work of a fixed-blade knife. Its debut revolutionized hunting knives, rapidly becoming one of the most popular knives ever made, with some 15 million Model 110 knives produced since 1964, and the one million a year production threshold reached in 2010. Before 1981, the specially heat treated stainless steel used was 440C, and from 1981 to 1992 the company used 425M steel. Since 1993, Buck has mostly used 420HC stainless steel for Model 110 blades, although CPM S30V steel has also been used for some production runs. Its design is one of the most imitated knife patterns in the world.

In 2018, Buck introduced a new lightweight editions of the 110, a thick-handled FRN (fiberglass reinforced nylon) version called the LT.

== Recent developments ==
In 1984, Buck introduced a survival knife with a hollow handle for storage and a 7.5 inch blade with a serrated spine and prongs so the knife could double as a grappling hook. Dubbed the Buckmaster (Model 184), it was marketed to the military and fans of the Rambo films of the 1980s. The Buckmaster was soon followed by the M9 Bayonet manufactured for the United States Army, with an initial order of 315,600.

In 1992–1993, Buck introduced the Nighthawk, a fixed-blade knife with a 6.5 inch blade and a black handle made of Zytel for an ergonomic grip. This knife (Best M9) was submitted to the United States Marine Corps for evaluation for use by the Marines.

In 2000, due to a demand from major retailers to reduce prices, Buck opened a plant in China. Imports to the United States from this plant had reached a high of 30 percent at one time, but have dropped to 13 percent with the majority of these knives going to large retailers as opposed to sporting goods stores or knife shops.

In 2005, the company relocated to Post Falls, Idaho. Leaders of the San Diego business community considered this move a blow to San Diego County's economic landscape and a symbol of the state of California's problems in attracting and keeping businesses.

Buck Knives has collaborated with different custom knifemakers such as Tom Mayo, Mick Strider, David Yellowhorse and Rob Simonich.

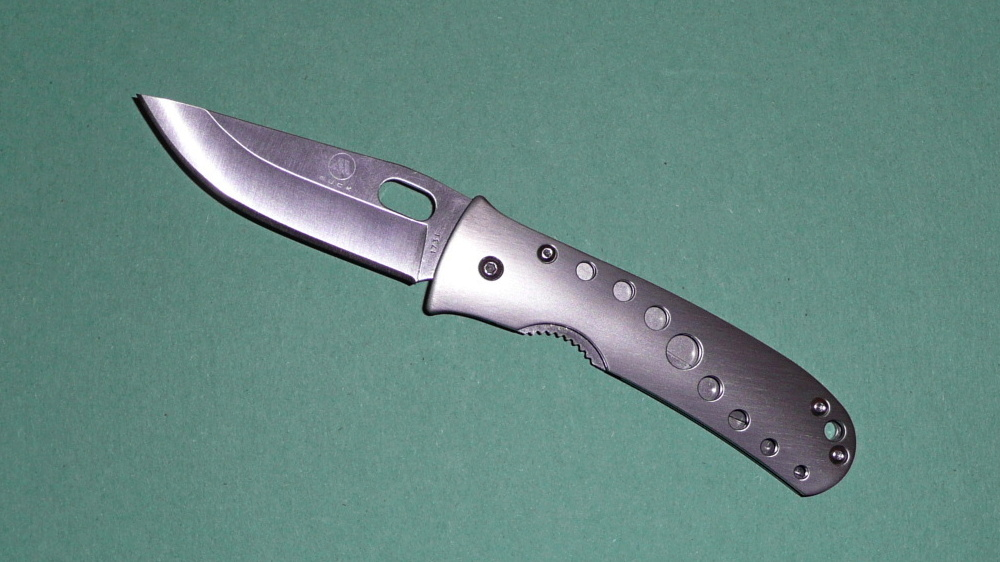
Buck Mayo Northshore 173

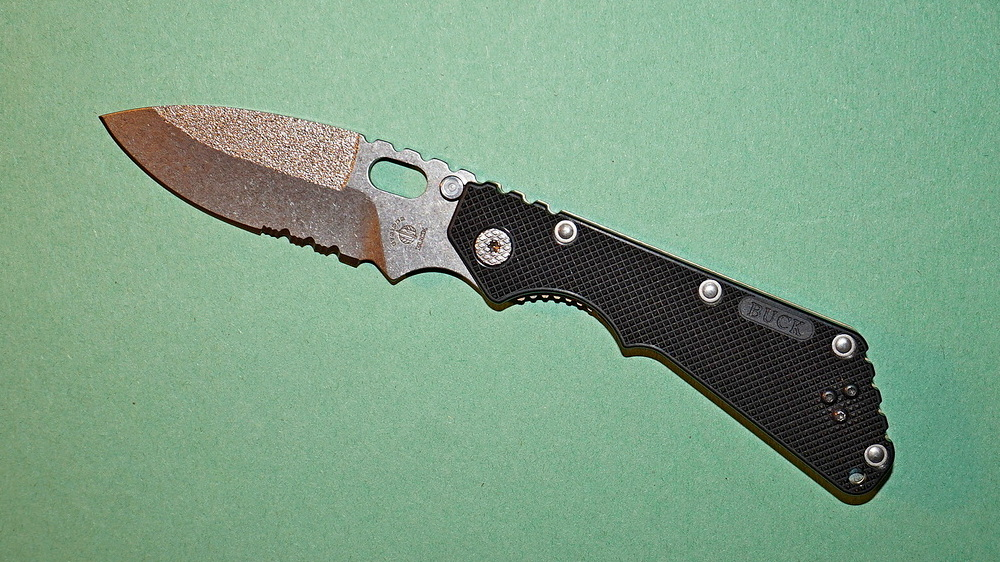
Buck Strider SBT Police Advocate 887

Al and Chuck Buck were inducted into the Blade magazine Cutlery Hall of Fame at the 1982 and 1996 Blade Shows respectively in Atlanta, Georgia in recognition for the impact that their designs and company have made upon the cutlery industry. Buck's heat treater, Paul Bos, who heat treats knives for other custom makers and production companies at Buck's facility, was inducted into the Hall of Fame in 2011.

== See also ==
- Knife making
- Gerber Legendary Blades
- List of companies based in Idaho
