= Commander (knife) =

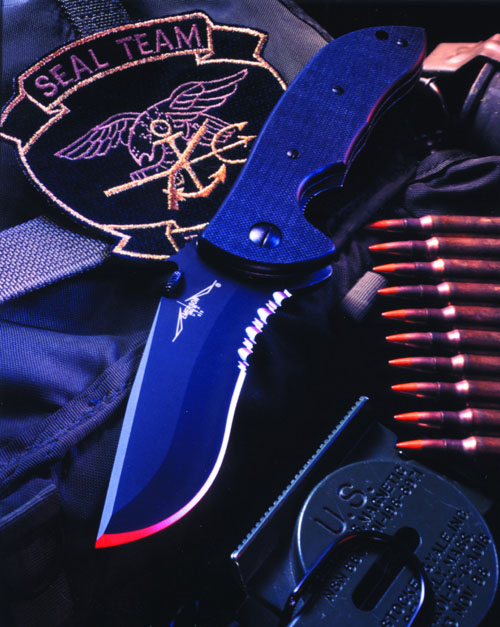
- "Emerson Commander"
- Type: Folding knife
- Place of origin: United States

Service history
- Wars: War on terror, Operation Iraqi Freedom

Production history
- Designer: Ernest Emerson
- Designed: 1997
- Manufacturer: Emerson Knives, Inc.
- Produced: 1998 through present
- No. built: 3,000+
- Variants: ES1-M, ES1-C, Super Commander, Mini Commander, Micro Commander, Waveless Commander, Thumbless Commander, SSDS, CQC16

Specifications
- Length: 8.8 in (220 mm)
- Blade length: 3.75 in (95 mm)
- Blade type: Recurve, made from 154CM, S30V, Titanium, Damascus steel
- Hilt type: G-10 laminate and 64AVL Titanium
- Scabbard/sheath: Pocket Clip

The Commander is a large recurve folding knife made by Emerson Knives, Inc.. It is based on a custom design, the ES1-M, by Ernest Emerson that he originally built for a West Coast Navy SEAL Team.

== History ==
Ernest Emerson was working on a SERE (Survival, Escape, Resistance, and Evasion) folding knife for troops at Fort Bragg.

When officers from Naval Special Warfare saw this knife they felt that with a few small changes such as the addition of a blade-catcher, it would suit their needs: the final result was dubbed the ES1-M.

The knife was later added to the production line of Emerson's new factory and was called "The Commander".

== Design ==
SSDS (Rhino)

=== SSRT ===
The Commander has its origins with Emerson's CQC-8 or "Banana" folding fighting knife based on the Bob Taylor Warrior Knife and the Bill Moran ST-23: a knife designed with the blade in line for reverse grip or sabre grip fighting.

This knife became popular among the British SAS and the US Navy SEALs, however the SEALs wanted something more aggressive so Emerson developed the SSRT (Silent Sentry Removal tool) model: a larger, hooked blade with a serrated, doubled-edged spine.

The SSRT's blade's profile resembled the horn of a Rhinoceros and its more popular name is the Rhino.

The blade folded below the level of the handle scales so the user could not be cut by this extra edge, a small hole drilled through both handle scales and liners allowed the blade to be held in place so it would not open on a parachute jump and cause harm to the operator.

Although the knife functioned perfectly in the field, its final design was too specific for the Navy.

=== Commander ===
The Commander features a recurve shaped blade that is 3.75 in (95 mm) long and hardened to a Rockwell hardness of 57-59 RC.

==== Handle ====
The handle is 5 in (130 mm) long making the knife 8.75 in (222 mm) in length when opened.

The handle material of the Commander is composed of two titanium liners utilizing a Walker liner lock and a double detent as the locking mechanism. The reasons for using titanium as a liner lock material were due to its exceptional strength-to-weight ratio and corrosion resistance.

The handle's scales are made from black G-10 Fiberglass, although models were made for a few years utilizing green G-10 and limited runs have been made with a desert tan color.

==== Blade ====
The blade steel is Crucible's 154 CM and is 0.125 in (3.2 mm) thick, although CPM S30V steel, ATS-34, Damascus steel, and Titanium with a carbide edge have been used.

Some models are made with partially serrated blades to aid in the cutting of seatbelts or webbing.

The butt-end of the knife features a hole for tying a lanyard.

A pocket clip held in place by three screws allows the knife to be clipped to a pocket, web-gear, or MOLLE.

==== The Wave ====
In field-testing it was realized that the blade-catcher would open the knife when drawn from the pocket. Emerson modified this design and secured a patent for it in March 1999.

The Wave is a small hook on the spine of the blade designed to catch the edge of a user's pocket. The blade opens as the knife is drawn. Each model is equipped with the mechanism, aside from one-off versions that lacked it.

== Variants ==
=== ES1-C ===
Civilian version without the blade-catcher.

=== Mini Commander ===
The Mini Commander is a 10% downsized version of the Commander.

The Mini Commander is built to the same specifications except the blade is 3.4 in (86 mm) in length and 8 in (200 mm) overall. Likewise, the Super Commander has a 4 in (100 mm) blade and is 9.5 in (240 mm) in overall length.

=== Super Commander ===
In 2000, Emerson Knives offered a larger version based on the original size of the ES1-M and called it the "Super Commander".

The first runs of Super Commanders were made as limited editions for Triple Aught Design (TAD) Gear of San Francisco and featured the company's logo on the reverse side of the blade.

In 2005 the Super Commander became a regular model in the company's lineup.

=== CQC-16 ===
In 2006, Emerson released a Commander with a larger clip-point blade and no recurve. This model was specifically made for the hunting market as a skinning knife. Its designation is the CQC-16.

=== UBR Commander ===
At the 2010 SHOT Show in Las Vegas, NV, Emerson unveiled the UBR Commander, a 10% scaled-up version of the Super Commander.

=== Automatic version ===
In 2009, at the annual Blade Show in Atlanta, Georgia, Emerson announced a collaboration with Kershaw Knives to manufacture an automatic version of the Commander.

== Users ==
- United States
  - US Navy SEALs

== Collection ==
The earliest run in 1998 is one of the most sought-after production models by collectors, as the majority of the work from waterjet cutting the liners to grinding the blades was performed by hand, by Emerson himself.

== In the media ==
The Commander was featured in the short-lived UPN television series Soldier of Fortune, Inc. and was used by the character of Zak in the 1998 movie The Placebo Effect. The knife is written about in the military and spy novels of Dennis Chalker and Marcus Wynne and Barry Eisler's John Rain.

== Accolades ==
The Commander was the winner of the Blade Magazine Overall Knife of the Year Award for 1999.

== See also ==
- M7 bayonet
- M9 bayonet
- Strider SMF
- SARK
- Sebenza
- Umnunzaan
- CQC-6
- Aircrew Survival Egress Knife
- OKC-3S Bayonet
- KA-BAR
