= Strider SMF =

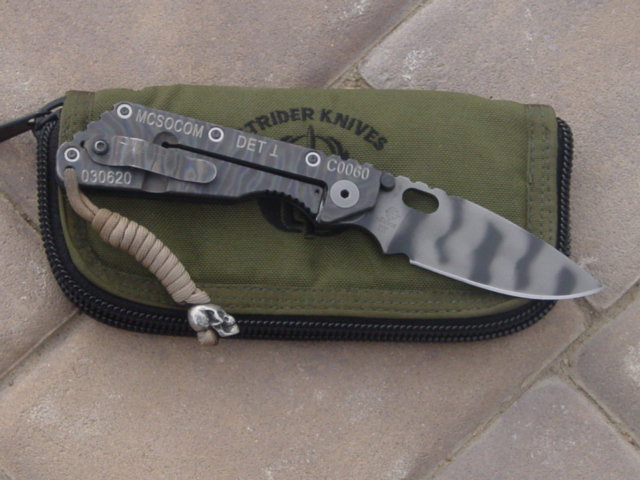
- Numbered civilian version (C0060) of the Strider SMF
- Type: Folding knife
- Place of origin: United States

Service history
- Wars: War on terror, Operation Iraqi Freedom

Production history
- Designer: Mick Strider, Duane Dwyer
- Designed: 2002
- Manufacturer: Strider Knives
- Produced: 2003 - present
- No. built: 300+
- Variants: MARSOC numbered version, civilian numbered version, unmarked version, NSN knife

Specifications
- Length: 9 in (23 cm)
- Blade length: 4 in (10 cm)
- Blade type: Drop point S30V Steel
- Hilt type: G10 and 64AVL Titanium
- Scabbard/sheath: Cordura Pouch or Pocket Clip

The Strider SMF is a framelock folding knife that was specifically developed for Det One, the first unit of the United States Marine Corps (USMC) under the United States Special Operations Command (SOCOM).

== Design ==
The SMF knife is manufactured by Strider Knives of Escondido, California.

The knife features a 4 in (10 cm) drop point flat ground tiger striped blade of CPM S30V steel.

The handle is composed of a fire anodized titanium frame, oil impregnated bronze bushings, an oversized pivot screw 0.19 in (0.48 cm) in diameter, and a textured G10 glass-reinforced plastic scale with an incorporated backspacer.

The NATO Stock Number for the SMF knife is 1095-01-531-5015.

The latest version of this knife (generation 2 and above) includes the Hinderer Lockbar Stabilizer, a mechanism designed by custom knifemaker Rick Hinderer and licensed for use by Strider.

The lockbar stabilizer is a metal disc contained in the titanium lockbar which is designed to preserve the life of the framelock by preventing overtravel and flex.

The original knives designed for the Marines' SOCOM unit in 2003 do not include this feature, but subsequent versions do.

== Production ==
The initial run of Strider SMF consisted of 300 knives.

150 were produced for the servicemen and 150 similarly marked knives for collectors whose purchase offset the cost of the knives for the military.

=== Variants ===
There are several small differences between the military and civilian versions of this knife.

Military issued knives had no letter in the serial number, whereas the civilian counterpart was preceded by a "C" in the serial number.

Approximately 12 prototype models were produced with an "XM" preceding the serial number. The Marine version also features a coyote brown colored G-10 scale whereas the civilian version's scale is made of black G-10.

The civilian version lacks the Raider insignia which is stamped on the blade of the Marine version.

== Adoption ==
The last time the Marine Corps issued a knife to an individual unit was in 1942, when the United States Marine Raider stiletto was issued to Marine Raiders until the unit was disbanded in 1944.^{1}

When Det One was formed and their equipment being chosen, they decided not to use the traditional Marine Ka-Bar nor did they go with a dagger design as the Marine Raiders had been issued 60 years previously.

Eventually, Det One chose Strider's SMF folding knife as their issued blade. Thus, the Strider SMF was the first knife issued to an individual USMC unit in over 60 years and the first tactical folder issued within the USMC.

The SMF knife is marked with the date of the Marine unit's activation (030620 or 20 June 2003) as well as "DET-1" on the frame. In addition, the military version bears the insignia of the Marine Raiders.

After rigorous field testing, including parachute jumps, the unit's commanding officer, Colonel Robert Coates remarked that the knife was "selected by, built for, and issued to the Marine Corps SOCOM Detachment."

== Users ==
- United States
  - Det One

== See also ==
- M7 bayonet
- M9 bayonet
- SARK
- CQC-6
- Sebenza
- Umnunzaan
- Commander (knife)
- Aircrew Survival Egress Knife
- OKC-3S Bayonet
- KA-BAR
- Mark 3 knife
- List of weapons of the U.S. Marine Corps
- List of individual weapons of the U.S. Armed Forces

== Footnotes ==
- Note 1: According to Pat Rogers: "An example of this is the fact that for only the second time in Marine Corps history, a knife was selected by, built for and issued to a specific Marine Corps unit—the Strider MCSOCCOM. The Marine Raiders of the Second World War, from which the Det has traced its lineage, were the first to have a knife made for them. This was the USMC Stiletto, made by Camillus Cutlery, a copy of the Fairbairn–Sykes Fighting Knife, with 14,370 made. (The second Raider Bn adopted the Collins #18 Bowie knife—a commercial knife not made especially for them. Commonly called the “Gung Ho" knife, less than one thousand were issued."
