= SARK =

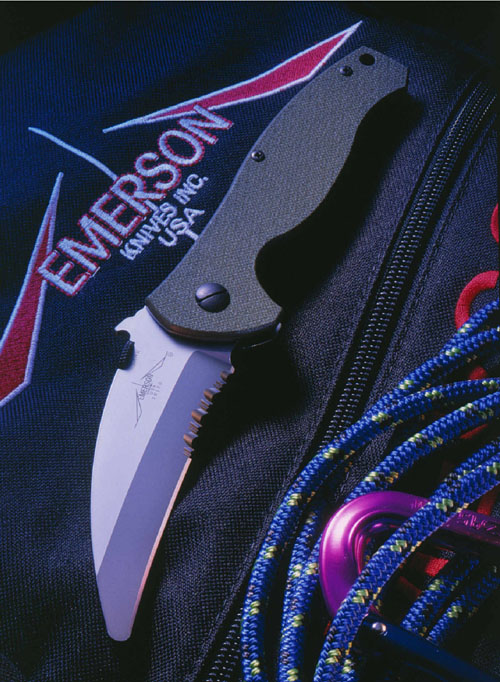
- Emerson SARK
- Type: Folding knife
- Place of origin: United States

Service history
- Wars: War on terror, Operation Iraqi Freedom

Production history
- Designer: Ernest Emerson
- Designed: 1999
- Manufacturer: Emerson Knives, Inc.
- Produced: 1999 through present
- No. built: 3,000+
- Variants: P-SARK (pointed tip), NSAR (line cutter on blade spine)

Specifications
- Length: 8.2 inches (210 mm)
- Blade length: 3.5 inches (89 mm)
- Blade type: Hawkbill, 154CM steel
- Hilt type: G-10 laminate and 64AVL Titanium
- Scabbard/sheath: Pocket Clip

The SARK (lit. 'Search and Rescue Knife') or NSAR (lit. 'Navy Search and Rescue') is a folding knife designed by knifemaker Ernest Emerson for use as a search and rescue knife by the US military.

== History ==
After a helicopter crash in 1999, which resulted in the deaths of six marines and one sailor, the United States Navy performed an assessment of its equipment and decided, among other things, that it needed a new search and rescue knife.

The KA-BAR knives issued to the Special Boat Units (SBUs) had catastrophically failed to cut the marines free from their webbing.

The Navy went to Emerson Knives, Inc., whose owner, Ernest Emerson, designed and fabricated a working prototype within 24 hours.

The Navy found that the knife met its needs, and the model was dubbed the "SARK" (Search and Rescue Knife).

== Design ==
The SARK is a folding knife with a wharncliffe-style hawkbill blade and blunt tip designed so that a rescuer could cut trapped victims free without stabbing them.

The SARK, PSARK, and NSAR, like all of Emerson's knives, are made in the US.

All three models have a wharncliffe shaped chisel-ground blade that is 3.5 inches (89 mm) long and hardened to a Rockwell hardness of 57-59 RC.

The handle is 4.7 inches (120 mm) long, making the knife 8.2 inches (210 mm) in length when opened.

The blade steel is Crucible's 154CM and is 0.125 inches (3.2 mm) thick. The butt-end of the knife is square-shaped and has a hole for tying a lanyard.

Some models are made with partially serrated blades to aid in the cutting of seatbelts or webbing.

The handle of the SARK is made of two titanium liners utilizing a Walker linerlock and a double detent as the locking mechanism. Titanium is used due to its exceptional strength-to-weight ratio and corrosion resistance.

The handle's scales are made from black G-10 fiberglass, although models were made for a few years using green G-10. A pocket clip held in place by three screws allows the knife to be clipped to a pocket, web-gear or MOLLE.

Each model is equipped with Emerson's Wave opening mechanism, a small hook on the spine of the blade designed to catch the edge of a user's pocket, opening the blade as the knife is drawn.

== Variants ==
=== P-SARK ===
Seeing another need in the police community, Senior Corporal Darryl Bolke, a police officer of the Ontario Police Department, approached Emerson and asked for a modification to the SARK.

Bolke's request was to make the tip of the blade pointed rather than blunt. Emerson replaced the blunt end of the SARK with a pointed end and named it the "P-SARK", or Police Search And Rescue Knife.

Bolke wrote the knife policy for his department, the first of its kind in the United States.

The P-SARK has been adopted by a number of law enforcement agencies since that time.

=== NSAR ===
In 2005, the Navy changed the requirements on the SARK to incorporate a guthook on the back of the blade for use as a line-cutter.

Emerson made the change on this model, which was designated the NSAR (Navy Search And Rescue) Knife and only made available to the United States Navy.

== Users ==
- United States
  - US Navy
  - Law enforcement in the United States

== See also ==
- M7 bayonet
- M9 bayonet
- Strider SMF
- Commander (knife)
- Sebenza
- Umnunzaan
- CQC-6
- Aircrew Survival Egress Knife
- OKC-3S Bayonet
- KA-BAR
