= Chris Reeve =

South African-American knife maker (born 1953)

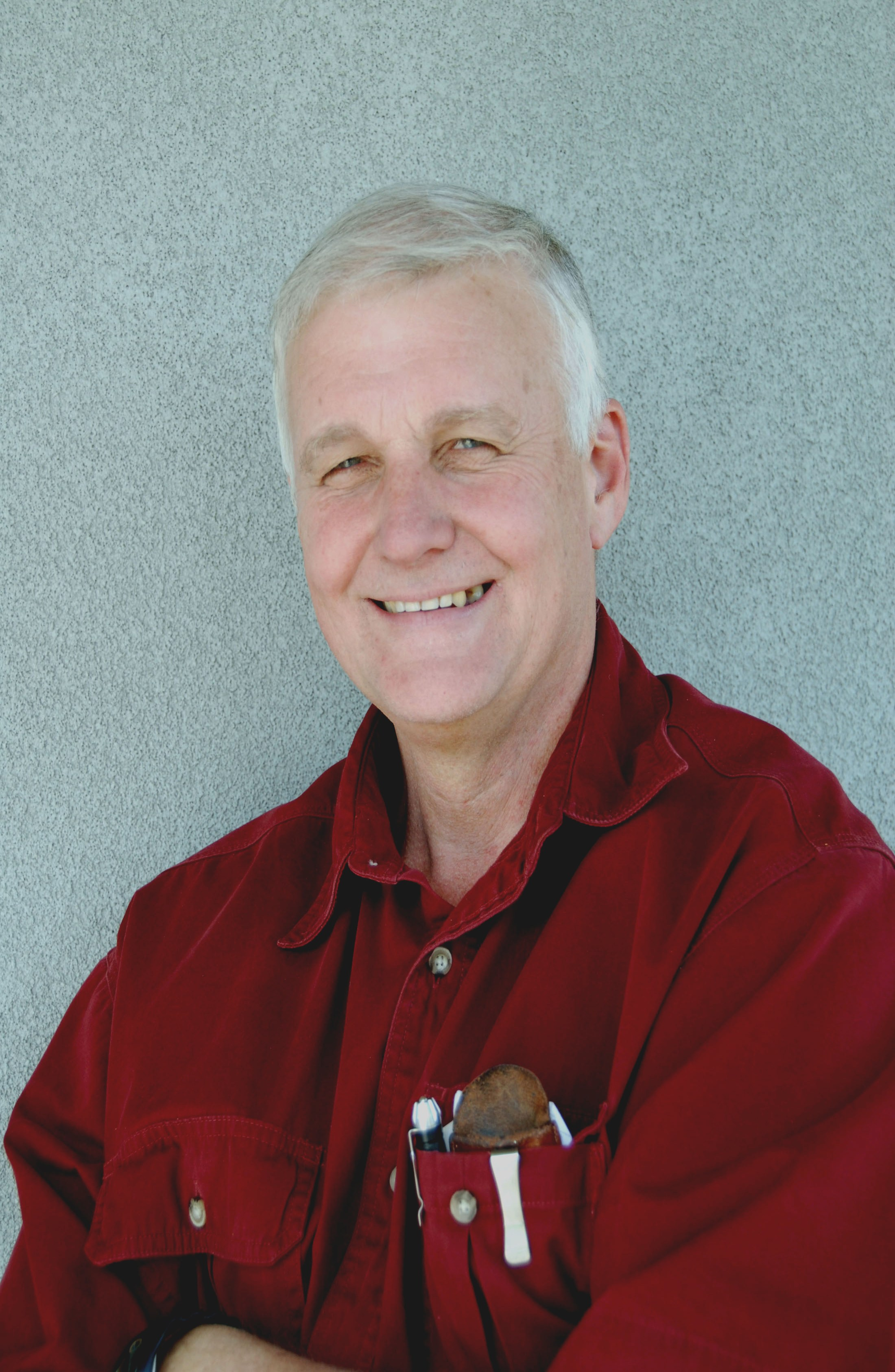
- Born: Christopher Stanley Reeve; December 4, 1953 (age 72); Durban, South Africa
- Occupations: Tool and die maker; knife designer; entrepreneur
- Spouse: Anne (Cameron) Reeve (m. 1987; div. 2014)
- Children: Tim Reeve
- Parents: Stanley F. Reeve; Muriel (Dicks) Reeve

Christopher Stanley Reeve (born December 4, 1953) is a South African-American knife maker, recognized as one of the most influential people in knife making history.

== Background ==
Christopher Stanley Reeve was born on December 4, 1953, in Durban, South Africa.

His original vocation was that of tool and die making. Reeve trained at the Pineware Manufacturing Company, serving a four-year tool- and die-making apprenticeship that finished in 1978.

Reeve credits his experience in tool and die for developing his grinding skills and giving him the manufacturing and materials knowledge he needed to jumpstart him in professional knife making.

As a young man, Reeve’s spare time was largely spent engaged in motorcycle racing. In the late 1970s and early 1980s, he was a regular competitor in South Africa’s Grand Prix motorcycle racing circuit. Unlike many of his competitors, Reeve did not have corporate funding.

As a result, Reeve used the highly competitive race setting to hone his problem-solving skills, custom tuning his motorcycle with components often designed and fabricated in his own shop.

In 1987, Chris married Anne Cameron in Johannesburg, South Africa. In order to pursue improved business opportunities, Chris and Anne moved to the United States in 1989, and settled in Boise, Idaho. In 2003, Chris and Anne were granted US citizenship.

== Career ==
=== Early days ===
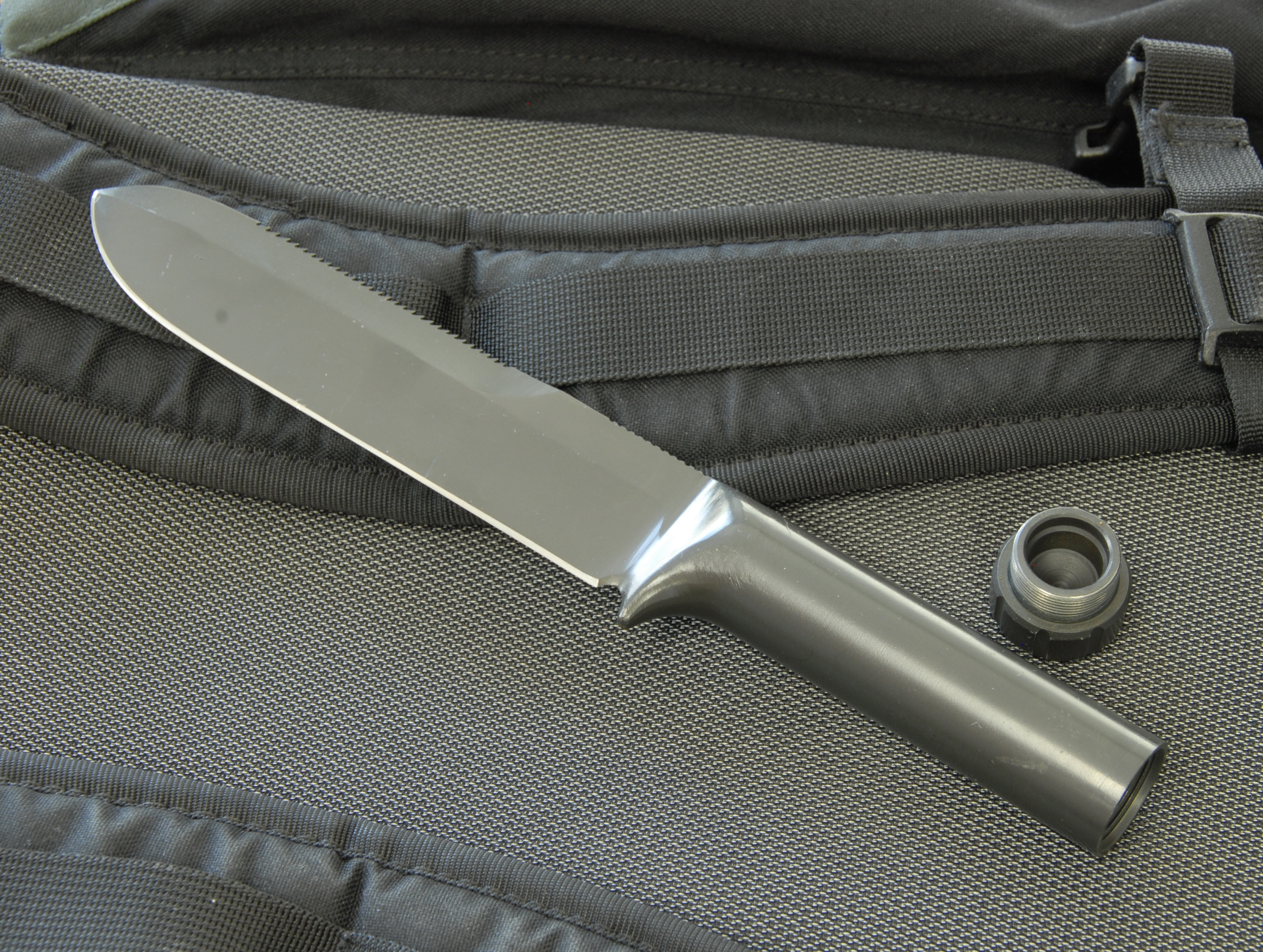
Chris Reeve "Survival Knife" -- a custom piece that was the forerunner to the One Piece Range manufactured at Chris Reeve Knives

Reeve began his knife-making career by chance.

Before being called up for a 3-month compulsory military service period in 1975 on the Mozambique / South African border, he noted that the standard army kit did not include a good all-purpose knife.

As a result, Reeve decided to design and make one.

A subsequent three-month military service period in 1978 was spent on the Angola/ Namibia border.

Reeve had previously designed and made for himself a hidden tang knife with a wooden handle, inlaid with silver wire. The climate in Durban where the knife was made, is hot and humid, while the Angola/Namibia area is semi-desert.

After a few days in the dry air, the wooden handle had dried and large cracks appeared. This set Reeve thinking about a knife that could be used across all climates without such damage.

The idea of an all-steel knife, with both handle and blade made from a single solid bar, started to germinate. Reeve’s resulting one piece knife concept was first produced as a custom knife in 1982.

The one piece concept hit production as the 7 inch bladed MK IV, with 40 pieces becoming available for sale early in 1983. Chris stopped tool making and became a full-time knifemaker in January 1984.

=== Custom knifemaking ===
Reeve founded Chris Reeve Knives (CRK) in 1984.

Early in Reeve’s career, he engaged in making custom knives. Today, Reeve still makes custom knives as time allows.

These custom pieces are of his own design, although sometimes there is a cultural influence – often European or Japanese.

Reeve’s custom knives include folding knives with uncommon locking mechanisms, daggers and other fixed blade knives of unique styling, and table cutlery. Reeve uses exotic materials, frequently inlaying gold, pearl or unusual types of wood into titanium or wooden handles to create an interesting contrast of color and texture.

He learned much of his knowledge of wood from his father who, as a young man, collected stumps and root sections.

=== Retirement ===
In 2014, Reeve retired and was inducted into the Blade Magazine Hall of Fame in 2015.

== Significant inventions ==
=== One Piece concept ===
The concept of a fixed blade, hollow handled knife, with both the handle and blade milled from a single billet of steel.

=== Lock 45 ===
A folding knife lock, is formed by a lock bar with recesses containing 45 degree angles mating with the rear of the blade.

The lock bar/blade interface serves as both the blade stop and the lock mechanism.

=== Helix Lock ===
A modification of the Opinel folding knife ferrule lock, which enables one-handed opening and closing.

=== Integral Lock ===
A folding knife lock, introduced with and popularized by the Sebenza folding knife, where one of the handle slabs is slotted to form a lock bar, which falls into place behind the blade to stop the blade from closing.

=== CPM S35VN ===
A stainless steel using the powder metallurgy process.

Reeve worked with the Crucible Steel Company to develop this steel specifically for the cutlery industry.

=== Kubuli serrations ===
Serrations are placed in a knife blade, alternating from both the left and right sides of the blade, forming two rows of serrations that are not collinear. As a result, Kubuli serrations move the material to be cut from side to side as the cut is being made.

=== Perforated thrust washers ===
Initially brought to market by the Umnumzaan folding knife in 2008, Reeve's design of perforated washers reduces pivot friction and serves to retain lubricant.

After their successful employment in the Umnumzaan, perforated thrust washers were incorporated into the design of the Sebenza.

=== Ceramic ball integrated into integral lock bar ===
Also introduced as a feature in the Umnumzaan, the ceramic ball is embedded into the end of the lock bar, creating the interface between the blade locking surface and the integral locking arm surface. The ball doubles to drop into a mating detent on the blade to ensure that the blade does not open accidentally.

== Awards ==
- South African National Knife Collectors Association: Best Fixed Blade Collection - 1983
- South African National Knife Collectors Association: Best Collection Displayed - 1984
- Durban Easter Custom Cutlery Exhibition: Best Fixed Blade - April 1987
- Knifemakers Guild of Southern Africa: Best Folding Knife - November 1987
- Shotgun News Gun and Knife Show, Reno, NV: Best Combat Knife - July 1988
- Arizona Knife Collectors Association: Best Custom Folder - December 1989
- Beretta Award for Outstanding Achievement in Handcrafted Cutlery: October 1990
- Knife-Aholics Unanimous Award: Knife Maker Extraordinaire - July 1992
- Knifemakers Guild: "Most Innovative Folder at the Show"—July 1993
- Blade magazine Cutlery Hall of Fame at the 2015 Blade Show in Atlanta, Georgia.

== See also ==
- Sebenza
- Folding knife
- Umnumzaan
- Chris Reeves Knives
