= Emerson Knives =

American knife company

Emerson Knives, Inc.
- Type: Proprietorship
- Industry: Manufacturing
- Founded: 1996; 30 years ago
- Headquarters: Torrance, California
- Key people: Ernest Emerson, Founder & President
- Products: Knives
- Revenue: US$10 million
- Number of employees: 20–25
- Website: www.emersonknives.com

Emerson Knives, Inc. is an American company that produces knives and related products. It was founded in 1996 by custom knifemaker Ernest Emerson in an effort to mass-produce his folding knife designs for the U.S. Military and collector markets.

== History ==
In February 1996, custom Knifemaker Ernest Emerson and his wife, Mary, founded Emerson Knives, Inc. (also referred to as EKI) in Torrance, California to manufacture knives on a larger scale than a custom knifemaker was capable. This new company would be a distinct entity from his Specwar lineup of custom knives, although several of Emerson's custom designs have made their way into production. Four years after starting this venture, Emerson sold an entire year's worth of production in four hours at the SHOT (Shooting Hunting and Outdoor Trade) Show in January 2000.

== Products ==
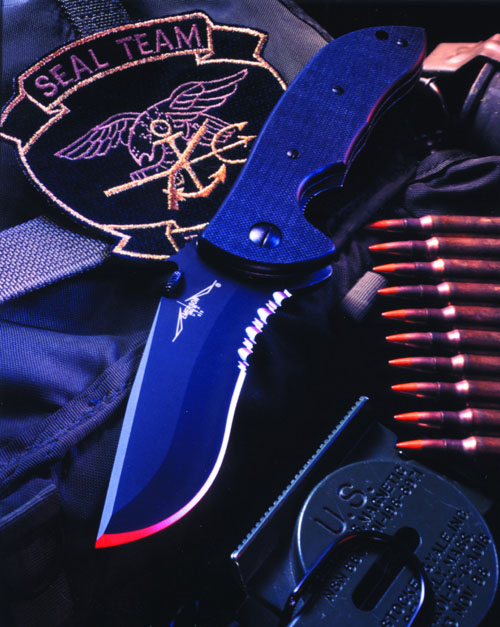
Emerson Commander

Emerson Knives primarily manufactures tactical folding knives utilizing the Walker linerlock. EKI most commonly machines blades of Crucible's 154CM steel by using the stock-removal method. Small runs of knives have been produced utilizing steels such as CPM S30V steel, CPM S35VN, and Titanium with a carbide edge. The handles are constructed with titanium liners, G10 fiberglass scales, and a G10 backspacer. Since 2009 EKI has been using a stainless steel liner on the non-locking side in order to keep costs down.

The most common models are the CQC-7, Commander, SARK, Karambit, Raven, and the SPECWAR. The majority of Emerson's folding knives are equipped with the Wave: a hook on the spine of the blade (originally designed as a blade catcher) which, when snagged on the edge of the pocket or sheath causes the knife blade to open as it is drawn. Emerson called this innovation the Wave and secured a patent for it in March 1999.

The company makes a small variety of fixed blade knives. These models include the Police Utility Knife (PUK), Emerson's version of Fred Perrin's La Griffe, and a dagger.

Production knives made by the company differ from Emerson's custom knives by the logo on the blade which reads "Emerson Knives, Inc." Sometimes the model number is found on the blade with a date and a serial number. Additionally, custom knives made by Emerson have dual titanium liners and handles made from linen micarta with titanium bolsters. Emerson Knives Inc.'s primary focus is on the military and police markets. There is a large secondary market of collectors as there is with most knife companies.

In May 2013, a non-custom factory-made Emerson CQC-7 knife carried by the Navy SEAL who served as point man on the mission to kill or capture Osama bin Laden was auctioned off for charity, netting over $35,000.

=== List of knife models ===
Model	Description	Blade length	Blade Profile	Handle Material	Overall length	Year introduced
SPECWAR	The first model debuted by the company, a linerlock folding version of the SPECWAR Knife designed by Emerson in collaboration with Timberline Knives.	3.5"	Tanto or spearpoint	G10 scales, Titanium liners	7.5"	1996
Raven	The second model made by Emerson Knives, made with Kraydon handles (fiberglass) and a recessed linerlock.	3.5"	Tanto or spearpoint	Kraydon scales, Titanium liners	7.5"	1997
CQC-7	Emerson's first "Custom Design" to enter the Production lineup.	3.5"	Tanto or spearpoint	G10 scales, Titanium liners	7.5"	1997
Commander	Designed as a SERE knife based on the ES1-M, the first model to feature Emerson's Wave shaped opening device.	3.75"	Recurve	G10 scales, Titanium liners	8.8"	1998
SARK	A Search and Rescue Knife with a blunt tip, designed for the US Navy.	3.5"	Wharncliffe with blunt tip	G10 scales, Titanium liners	8.2"	1998
PSARK	A version of the SARK with a pointed tip, designed for Law Enforcement Use.	3.5"	Wharncliffe	G10 scales, Titanium liners	8.2"	1998
Blackbird	A standard linerlock and G10 handle version of the Raven.	3.5"	Tanto or spearpoint	G10 scales, Titanium liners	7.5"	1999
Mach 1, MAX-1	Originally called the Mach 1, it was renamed the MAX-1 in 2004.	3.5"	Spearpoint	G10 scales, Titanium liners	8.2"	1999
PUK	Police Utility Knife, a fixed-blade designed for Law Enforcement.	3.5"	Spearpoint or tanto	Kraydon handles replaced by G10 slabs on 2007 and later models	8.2"	1999
La Griffe	A fixed-blade designed for Law Enforcement, based on a Fred Perrin design.	1.75"	claw shape	bare metal	4.9"	1999
La Griffe WWR	A fixed-blade designed for White Water Rafting, based on a Fred Perrin design.	1.75"	claw shape, blunt tip, fully serrated blade	bare metal	4.9"	1999
NASA Knife	A version of the SPECWAR with a guthook, designed for NASA for use on Shuttle Missions and the ISS.	3.5"	Tanto	G10 scales, Titanium liners	7.5"	2000
I&I Tanto	A folding Tanto designed for Martial Arts Company I & I Sports.	4"	Tanto	G10 scales, Titanium liners	8.2"	2000
SOCFK	A version of the SPECWAR with the Wave shaped opening device, designed for Extreme Outfitters.	3.5"	Tanto or Spearpoint	G10 scales, Titanium liners	7.5"	2001
Mini Commander	A scaled-down version of the Commander Folding Knife.	3.4"	Recurve	G10 scales, Titanium liners	8"	2001
Mini CQC-7	A scaled-down version of the CQC-7 Folding Knife.	3"	Tanto or Spearpoint	G10 scales, Titanium liners	7"	2001
Super CQC-7	A scaled-up version of the CQC-7 Folding Knife.	3.78"	Tanto	G10 scales, Titanium liners	9.15"	2002
Combat Karambit	A folding version of the Indonesian Karambit Knife	2.6"	Curved	G10 scales, Titanium liners	6.8"	2002
Super Commander	A scaled-up version of the Commander Folding Knife, originally a TAD Gear Exclusive.	4"	Recurve	G10 scales, Titanium liners	9.5"	2003
CQC-8	A knife based on Bob Taylor's Warrior knife and Bill Moran's ST-23 designed in 1994 for Navy SEALs. The first production version, made in 2002, was part of a collaboration with SureFire Flashlights.	3.8"	sabre profile	G10 scales, Titanium liners	9.3"	2003
CQC-10	A bull-nosed folding knife. The first version was part of a collaboration with Heckler & Koch.	3.6"	bull nose	G10 scales, Titanium liners	8.5"	2003
CQC-11 a.k.a. UTCOM, a.k.a. Blackhawk	A kukri-shaped blade. The first version was part of a collaboration with Blackhawk Tactical.	4.1"	kukri recurve	G10 scales, Titanium liners	9.275"	2003
Persian	Based on an earlier Fixed-blade custom knife, the first version of this folder was an exclusive to Emerson Collectors.	4.1"	Upswept	G10 scales, Titanium liners	9.6"	2003
CQC-12	Originally designated the "Comrade Military Folder", Emerson's first Framelock design based on the AK-47 pattern bayonet.	3.9"	Clip point	G10 scales, Titanium liners	8.85"	2004
CQC-13	A folding Bowie Knife.	3.85"	Clip point	G10 scales, Titanium liners	9"	2004
CQC-14	A full sized handle with a shorter blade designed for jurisdictions with prohibitions on knife blades greater than 3".	2.7"	Spearpoint, tanto, and recurve	G10 scales, Titanium liners	7.6"	2004
NSAR	A version of the SARK with a linecutter, designed for Naval Air Rescue Units.	3.5"	Wharncliffe	G10 scales, Titanium liners	8.2"	2006
CQC-15	A recurved tanto blade folding knife.	3.9"	recurved tanto	G10 scales, Titanium liners	8.9"	2007
EDC Tanto	A folding Tanto designed for EDC Knives.	4"	Tanto	G10 scales, Titanium liners	8.2"	2007
CQC-16	A non-recurved Clip point Commander designed as a hunting/skinning knife.	4"	Clip point	G10 scales, Titanium liners	8.2"	2007
Horseman	A scaled-down version of the CQC-8.	3.4"	sabre profile	G10 scales, Titanium liners	8.35"	2007
Mini CQC-15	A recurved tanto blade folding knife.	3.5"	recurved tanto	G10 scales, Titanium liners	8"	2008
A-100	A spearpoint folding knife based on an early Custom Design.	3.6"	Spearpoint	G10 scales, Titanium liners	8.4"	2008
Super CQC-8	A scaled-up version of the CQC-8.	4.3"		G10 scales, Titanium liners	10.2"	2009
Mini A-100	A downsized version of the A-100.	3"	spearpoint	G10 scales, Titanium liners	7.2"	2009
Super Raven	A scaled-up version of the Raven.	3.9"		G10 scales, Titanium liners	9.3"	2009
Gentleman Jim	A folding clip-point named for Boxing Champion Jim Corbett.	3.75"	clip-point	G10 scales, Titanium liners	8.55"	2010
Roadhouse	A folding Tanto based on the earlier custom Warrior Fixed Blade.	3.8"	Tanto	G10 scales, Titanium liners	8.9"	2010
UBR Commander	A scaled-up version of the Super Commander.	4.4"	Recurve	G10 scales, Titanium liners	9.35"	2010
Tactical Kwaiken	A folding version of signature series fixed blade.	3.9"	Japanese tanto	G10 scales, Titanium liners	9.00	2018

== Collaborations ==
Emerson Knives has collaborated with other companies on knife-related projects. In 2002 Emerson Knives collaborated with Gerber Knives to create both companies' first automatic opening knife, the Gerber-Emerson Alliance. In that same year, Emerson Knives collaborated with SureFire Flashlights by making an exclusive CQC8 (Banana Knife) numbered and marked with the SureFire logo and sold with an identically numbered Emerson-marked Centurion C2 CombatLight. In 2005 Emerson Knives collaborated with Andy Prisco, the CEO of the American Tomahawk Company, to produce the CQC-T Tomahawk. This tomahawk features a curved head machined from 4140 steel with a rear spike and a lightweight fiberglass handle. Although not made by Emerson, the tomahawk was designed by him. In September 2010, Emerson Knives announced a collaboration with Pro-Tech Knives to produce an automatic opening version of the CQC-7. In November 2010, Emerson's Roadhouse Knife won Knives Illustrated's American Made Knife of 2010-2011 Award at the Spirit of Steel Show in Knoxville, TN. According to Emerson, the knife will be used as a prop on the Sons of Anarchy Television Show.
