= Chris Reeve Knives =

American knife manufacturing corporation

- Type: Corporation
- Industry: Manufacturing
- Founded: Boise, ID (1993; 33 years ago)
- Founder: Chris Reeve
- Headquarters: Boise, ID, United States
- Key people: Chris Reeve, Anne Reeve, Timothy Reeve
- Products: Knives
- Number of employees: 43
- Website: www.chrisreeve.com

Chris Reeve Knives is an American knife manufacturing corporation with international sales and distribution headquartered in Boise, Idaho, that designs, develops, and sells folding pocket knives and fixed-blade knives.

== History ==
Chris Reeve Knives was founded as a sole proprietorship in January 1984, with Chris Reeve making custom knives in the single garage attached to the house in which Reeve was living in Durban, South Africa.

In March 1989, Reeve and his wife Anne Reeve immigrated to the United States, and CRK commenced manufacturing in Boise, ID.

In July 1993, Chris Reeve Knives, sole proprietorship, became Reeve Incorporated, doing business as Chris Reeve Knives.

Their motto is Think Twice, Cut Once.

== Innovation ==
Chris Reeve Knives' industry contributions include the Integral Lock, contributions to the blade steels CPM-S30V and CPM-S35VN, and has won Blade Magazine's Blade Show Manufacturing Quality Award 15 times.

== Products ==
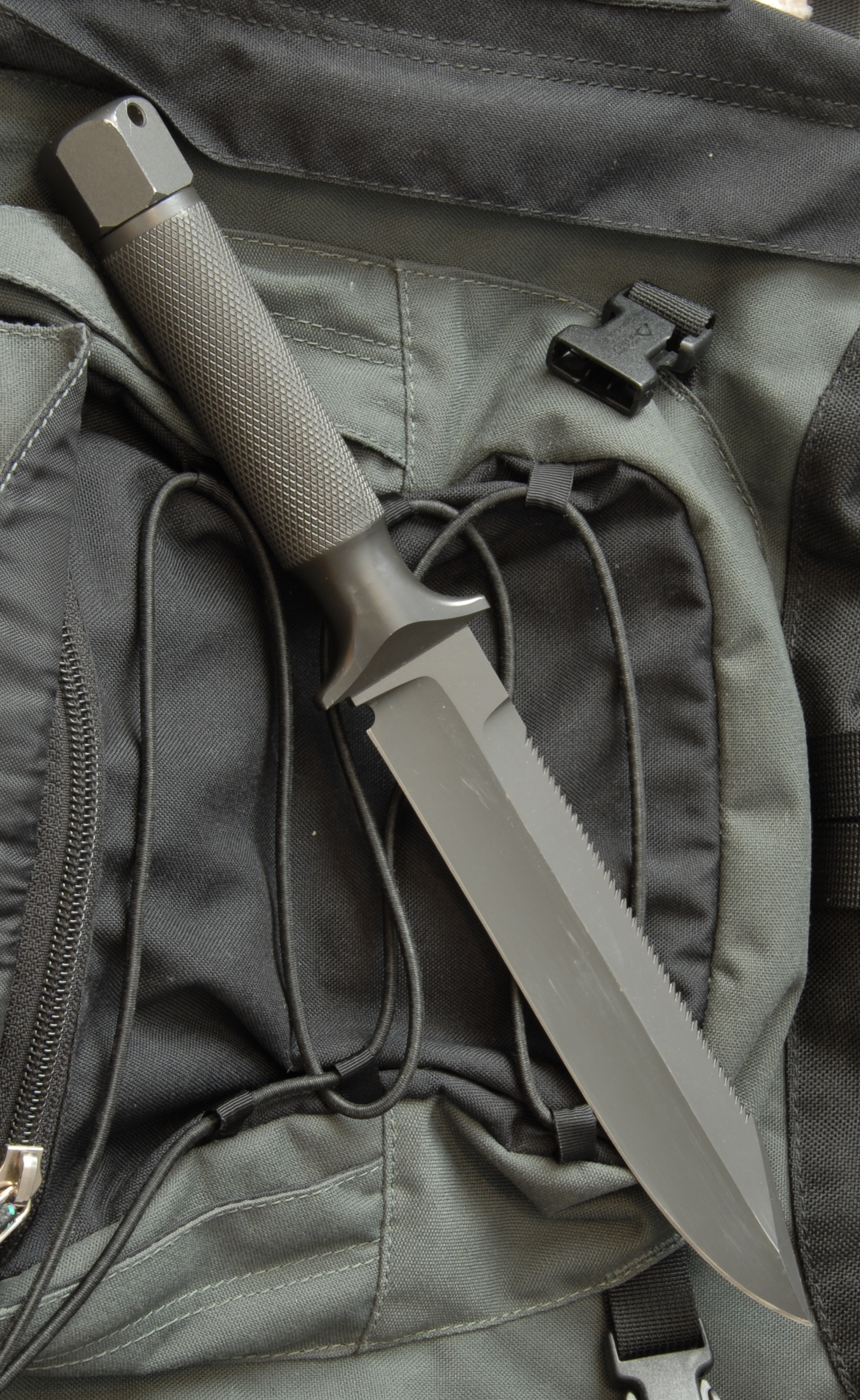
CRK Model Mark IV, the 1st production knife of the One Piece range of knives, circa 1983

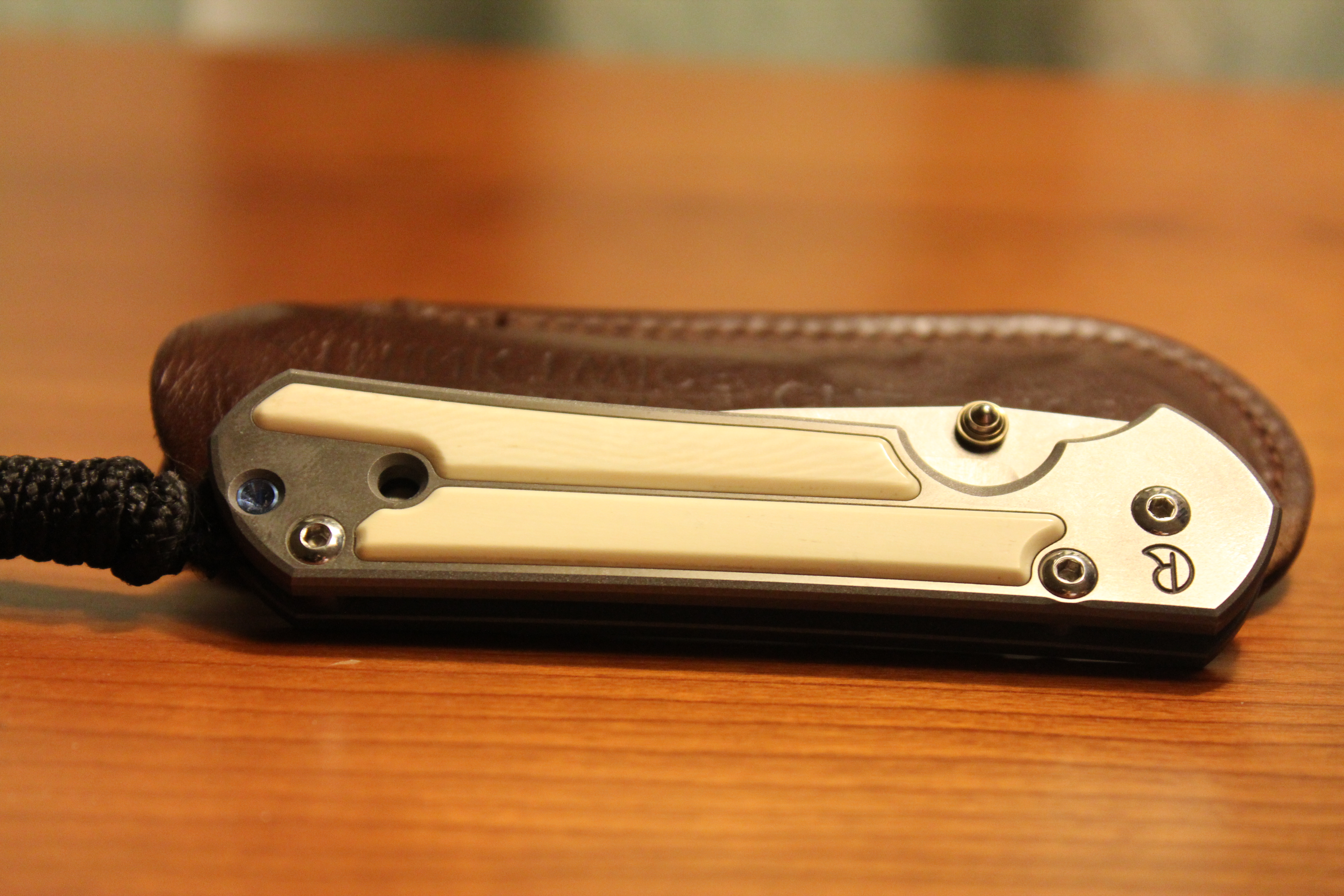
An example of a small Classic Sebenza with Mammoth Ivory inlays. Knife is resting on a CRK leather slip case.

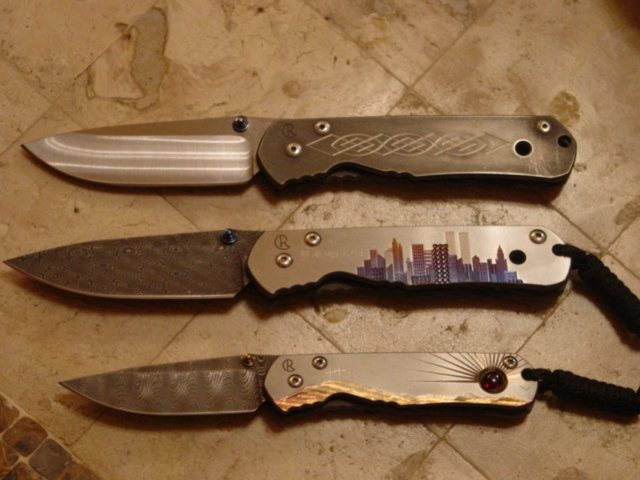
Three Sebenzas: Large Regular with ATS-34 Steel blade and a Large and Small Regulars featuring Damascus steel blades with manually engraved and anodized handles

=== Timeline ===
Range	Production time
One Piece	1983 – 2009
Sebenza	1991 – present
Umfaan	1997 – 2002
Mnandi	2001 – present
Green Beret	2002 – present
Neil Roberts Warrior	2004 – 2010
Inyoni	2005 – 2015
Pacific	2007 – present
Professional Soldier	2008 – 2017
Umnumzaan	2008 – present
Sikayo	2009 - 2019
Nyala	2010 – 2020
Ti-Lock	2010 – 2017
Inkosi	2015–present
Impinda	2018–present

=== Overview ===
==== One Piece ====
Fixed blade family of knives, featuring a hollow handle and blade manufactured from one continuous piece of A2 tool steel.

Models possess blade lengths ranging from 10.2 to 22.9 cm (4" to 9").

After nearly three decades of production, the One Piece Range was retired due to the expense of manufacture and the need to make room in the CRK portfolio for new designs.

===== Model families =====
Variant	Type
Sable	Sabre style blade
Shadow	Spear point blade
Mountaineer	Single guard clip point blade
Ubejane	Skinner
Mark	Double guard clip point blade

==== Sebenza ====
Folding knife, introducing a stronger variation of the Walker linerlock called the Sebenza Integral Lock, also commonly known as the framelock.

The Sebenza is a utility knife with titanium handles and was originally introduced with an ATS-34 stainless steel blade, followed by BG-42 and CPM S30V, and as of this writing, CPM S35VN steel and CPM S45VN steel.

===== Sebenza 25 =====
Released in 2012, the Sebenza 25 is named for the 25th year of the Sebenza and has technological improvements of a ceramic ball lockbar interface, larger pivot and what they call the 'large hollow grind'.

Additionally the Sebenza 25 has a thicker blade stock of 0.14" compared to 0.125" of the Large Sebenza 21.

==== Umfaan ====
Folding knife similar in design to that of the Sebenza, but with a blade length of 58.42 mm (2.3").

==== Mnandi ====
Folding knife utilizing an Integral Lock, partially covered by a cosmetic inlay, focused at the businessperson.

The Mnandi blade length is 69.5 mm (2.75") and like the Sebenza can also be had in Damascus Steel.

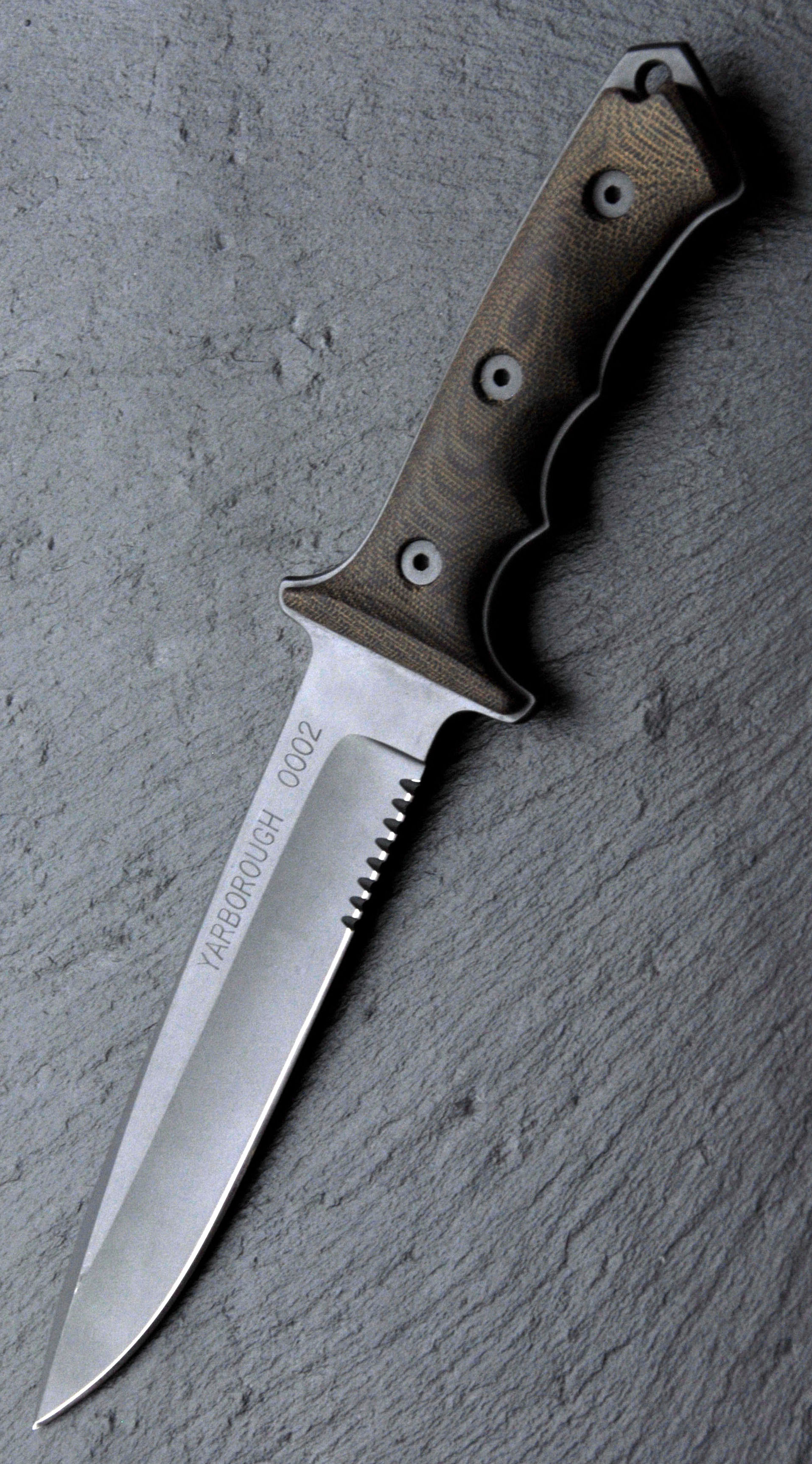
"The Yarborough", presented to each graduate of the US Army Special Forces Qualification Course. This knife was designed and built by Bill Harsey in collaboration with Chris Reeve Knives.

==== Neil Roberts Warrior ====
Fixed blade knife designed in collaboration with William Harsey, with 152.4 mm (6"), CPM S30V stainless steel recurve spearpoint blade.

This knife is dedicated to Neil C. Roberts, the first U.S. Navy SEAL killed in Afghanistan, at the Battle of Takur Ghar, in 2002.

==== Inyoni ====
Fixed blade bird and fish knife with 88.9 mm (3.5"), CPM S30V stainless steel double row (Kubuli) serrated blade.

==== Umnumzaan ====
Folding knife, with 2nd generation Integral Lock. The Umnumzaan is a utility knife with titanium handle slabs and 93.4 mm (3.675") CPM S30V stainless steel blade. It also features a glass breaker that is exposed when the knife is closed.

==== Sikayo ====
A range of chef's knives, the Sikayo is available in both 6.5" and 9.0" blade lengths.

The name Sikayo is the Zulu word for "sharp".

Sikayo blades are made with CPM S35V stainless steel, and are ground on one side only.

==== Nyala ====
The Nyala is a modern version of the classic skinning knife with a blade length of 3.75".

The integral handle and blade of CPM S35VN is possesses spiral and lineal grooves in the micarta handle providing incremental positive grip, and serrations on the spine are provided for enhanced control.

==== Ti-Lock ====
The Ti-Lock is a folding knife featuring a new locking mechanism by the same name.

The Ti-Lock mechanism was conceived as a means to isolate the lock from the body of the knife, in order to allow more design freedom for handle and frame. It is completely ambidextrous, allowing equal left and right hand use.

The Ti-Lock was a collaborative development by Grant and Gavin Hawk, and Chris Reeve.

==== Inkosi ====
Known as the "Chief" in Zulu, the Inkosi features a large hollow grind, twin oversized washers, strengthened pivot and sturdy lock up.

While challenging the standards of the Integral Lock®, the Inkosi uses a ceramic ball as an interface for the lock bar to the blade tang for a consistent lock-up. The washer diameter is wider than the blade securing zero sideways play.

With larger lubrication holes there is even less surface area of friction.

Finally, the large hollow grind provides a shallow radius that can improve strength, making it halfway between a flat grind and a standard hollow grind.

== Military use ==
=== Yarborough ===
A version of the Green Beret knife with special engraving and serialization on the blade, known as the Yarborough (named for Lieutenant General William P. Yarborough), is presented to select graduates of the United States Army Special Forces Q Course.

=== 1st Group Knife ===
The 1st Group Knife was designed and is manufactured at the request of the U.S. Army Special Forces 1st Group to commemorate their 50th anniversary of operations. The 1st Group Knife may only be purchased by active or retired 1st Group soldiers.

== Collaborations ==
Reeve collaborated with Dick Barber of Crucible Materials Corporation to develop CPM S30V steel as a knifemaking steel in 2003.

Chris Reeve Knives has collaborated with William Harsey Jr. on several fixed blade knife projects, and serves as the manufacturer of these knives.

=== Green Beret ===
Fixed blade knife designed featuring single row serrations and a CPM S30V stainless steel spear point blade, offered in 139 mm and 177 mm (5.5" and 7") blade lengths.

==== Pacific ====
Fixed blade knife designed with double row (Kubuli) serrations and 152.4 mm (6") CPM S30V stainless steel clip point blade.

The Pacific is the civilian version of the "1st Group Knife", denoted by special engraving on the knife blade.

=== Impinda ===
Known as “Fold, Repeat” in Zulu, the Impinda is a non-locking slipjoint style knife designed by William Harsey Jr. and manufactured by Chris Reeve Knives.

There is a unique cam-action to the backspring which means the knife is harder to close than it is to open, making it fundamentally more safe than traditional slipjoints. It has titanium handles and CPM S35VN blade and backspring.

This is the first time S35VN has been used for a spring. This model was announced at BLADE Show 2018.

=== Professional Soldier ===
Fixed blade knife designed with 86 mm (3.375") CPM S30V stainless steel with choice of drop point, insingo, or tanto blade, and cut-out in handle for use as a shackle wrench.

== Industry awards ==
- 1987 Knifemaker's Guild of Southern Africa "Best Folding Knife" (Sebenza predecessor)
- 1993 Knife-Aholics Unanomous "Most Innovative Folder", Lock 45
- 2000, 2001, 2003, 2004, 2005, 2006, 2007, 2008, 2009, 2010, 2011, 2012, 2013, 2015, 2016, 2019 "Manufacturing Quality Award®"
- 2003 "Collaboration Knife of the Year®" ("The Green Beret Knife", a collaboration between CRK and William Harsey Jr.)
- 2005 "Collector Knife of the Year®" ("21st Anniversary Sebenza")
- 2006 Grays Sporting Journal "Gray's Best" Award
- 2007 "American Made Knife of the Year®" ("The Pacific Knife", a collaboration between CRK and William Harsey Jr.)
- 2008 "Overall Knife of the Year®" ("Umnumzaan")
- 2008 "Field and Stream "Best of the Best" ("The Pacific Knife")
- 2009 "Kitchen Knife of the Year®" ("Sikayo")
- 2010 "Overall Knife of the Year®" ("Ti-Lock", a collaboration between CRK and Grant & Gavin Hawk)
- 2018 "American Made Knife of the Year®" ("Impinda", a collaboration between CRK and William Harsey Jr.)

== In popular culture ==
- The CRK large Regular Sebenza was shown in the TV series 24 (TV series), season 6, episode 1.
- The CRK large Classic Sebenza was used in the movie Collateral (film).
- CRK Sable IV and Project I One Piece Knives were featured in the novel The American Zone, by L. Neil Smith.
- CRK One Piece Range of knives were referenced in the novel Point of Origin, by Patricia Cornwell.
- The CRK Pacific was shown in the 2015 film, Mad Max.
- The CRK Green Beret 7" was shown in the 2016 film, Deadpool.

== See also ==
- List of companies based in Idaho
