= CQC-6 =

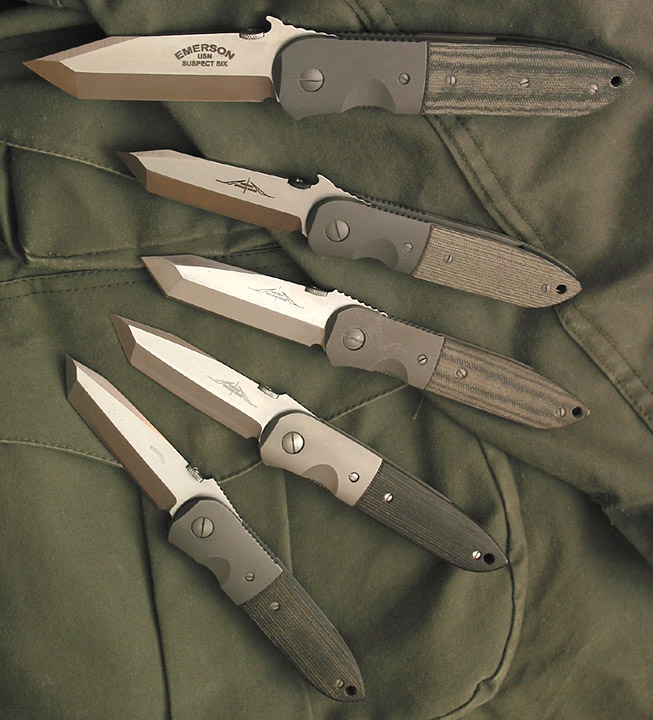
- Five variants of the CQC6
- Type: Folding Knife
- Place of origin: Torrance, California, USA

Service history
- In service: US Navy
- Used by: Navy SEALs
- Wars: Desert Storm, War on Terror, Operation Iraqi Freedom

Production history
- Designer: Ernest Emerson
- Designed: 1989
- Manufacturer: Emerson Knives
- Produced: 1989 through present
- No. built: 500
- Variants: spearpoint, hollow-ground, right-side grind, and Damascus blades

Specifications
- Length: 8 in (20 cm)
- Blade length: 3.3125 in (8.414 cm)
- Blade type: Tantō point ATS-34 Steel
- Hilt type: Linen Micarta and 64AVL Titanium
- Scabbard/sheath: Pocket Clip

The CQC-6 (Close Quarters Combat — Six) or Viper Six is a handmade tactical folding knife with a tantō blade manufactured by knifemaker Ernest Emerson. Although initially reported as the sixth design in an evolution of fighting knives and the first model in the lineup of Emerson's Specwar Custom Knives, Emerson later revealed that the knife was named for SEAL Team Six. It has a chisel-ground blade of ATS-34 or 154CM stainless steel and a handle made of titanium and linen micarta. The CQC-6 is credited as the knife that popularized the concept of the tactical folding knife.

== Specifications ==
The CQC-6 has a 3.3125 in (8.414 cm) long blade. The handle is 4.625 in (11.75 cm) long making the knife close to 8 in (20 cm) in length when opened. The butt-end of the knife tapers to a point and features a hole for tying a lanyard.

The blade profile of most CQC-6's is a Japanese chisel ground tantō with a single bevel or zero-ground blade sharpened on only one side. Early models have a buffline similar to a hamon found on a Japanese Samurai Sword due to a leather buffing wheel used by Emerson to finish his blades. Unlike the typical Japanese chisel-grind, Emerson's grind is on the left-side of the blade as opposed to the right-side.

The handle material of the CQC-6 is composed of two titanium liners utilizing a Walker linerlock and a single or double detent as the locking mechanism, although one experimental model exists with a ratchet lock. Titanium bolsters make up the front half of the knife with the back half represented by linen micarta scales. The reasons for using titanium as a linerlock material were due to its strength-to-weight ratio and corrosion resistance. The screws in the handle, and pivot are traditional straight-head screws to accommodate easy disassembly in the field with an improvised tool, if needed. Most models feature traction grooves for a more secure grip in a wet environment and a chamfered lockface. Early knives were made with black linen micarta and later models featured a proprietary green color made exclusively for Emerson. A pocket clip held in place by three screws allows the knife to be clipped to a pocket, web-gear, or MOLLE.

== History ==
In the mid-1980s, individual Navy SEALs from a West Coast team had been using personally purchased custom fixed-blade knives made by Southern California knifemaker Phill Hartsfield. Hartsfield's knives are hard ground from differentially heat-treated A2 tool steel and are known for their distinctive chisel-ground blades. More accurately, they are zero ground; that is, the edge has no secondary bevel, minimizing drag when used for cutting purposes. Emerson had long been impressed by the cutting ability of the chisel-ground edge and had asked Hartsfield's permission to incorporate it into his own folding knives, which Hartsfield granted. When the SEALs asked Hartsfield to make them a folding knife, he informed them that he did not make folding knives and referred them to Emerson who manufactured folding knives utilizing the Walker linerlock.

According to the SEALs' requirements, the knife had to be corrosion resistant, designed for easy cleaning in the field, durable enough to be used on a daily basis as a tool, and capable as a weapon should the need arise. Emerson's folding chisel-ground "tantō" became the sixth model in his Viper series and, while a handful of prototypes were referred to as "Viper 6", the model was soon named the "CQC-6" (CQC refers to "close-quarters combat") and was chosen by the SEALs for use. Writer, David Steele, refers to the CQC-6 as the sixth model after five prototypes as opposed to the next in the evolution of the Viper line of knives. Emerson, himself, says the moniker "six" was used because the SEALs in question were members of SEAL Team Six.

Ownership of a CQC6 soon became something of a status symbol among members of various elite military units, including Navy SEALs, Army Special Forces, German GSG 9, and British SAS. Because of this connection to the Special Warfare community, Emerson changed the name of his custom knife line to "Specwar Knives", and in 1994 this new designation began appearing in the logo on his line of custom blades. The CQC-6 was not an officially issued item, but rather one that was privately purchased by the troops in question.

Richard Marcinko's Rogue Warrior novels (Red Cell, Green Team, Task Force Blue, Detachment Bravo, SEAL Force Alpha, Violence of Action and Holy Terror) prominently feature the CQC-6 as a regularly carried piece of equipment. On page 175 of Task Force Blue, Marcinko remarks that his CQC6 was a "personal gift from Ernie Emerson, himself". The popularity of Marcinko's books helped fuel the popularity of the CQC-6 in particular and Tactical Folding Knives in general beyond the realm of Military and Law-enforcement personnel.

== Variants ==
While each CQC-6 is made by hand by Emerson, there are certain subtle variations between models of different years. The earliest examples feature the Emerson "half-moon" logo, which is simply the name "EMERSON" arranged in an arc on the blade. This was replaced by the Specwar logo in 1994 which resembles the gunsight on the Stealth aircraft and the moniker "Emerson Specwar Knives". The gunsight logo was briefly replaced by Emerson's Diamond logo for a period of 1 year(2004–2005), until the die to cut the logo was broken and Emerson resumed the Specwar log. In 2004, Emerson incorporated his patented "Wave" opening device into the profile of the blade.

The blade finish has almost uniformly been Emerson's trademark satin flats and matte edges. However, some models were made with a Black Tenifer coating. The steel was originally ATS-34 but was replaced by its American equivalent: 154 CM. Emerson has made "dress" versions with Damascus steel blades and Titanium blades with a bonded carbide edge.

Emerson has used exotic handle materials such as decorative hardwoods, abalone shell, and mother-of-pearl on these dress variants; these models often feature polished hardware as opposed to the bead blasted bolsters on the tactical models. A few early models featured a titanium backspacer, replaced in later years by a backspacer made of G10 fiberglass. Some early CQC-6's featured cutouts in the micarta handle slabs for a small pair of tweezers as found on the Swiss Army Knife.

In Japan there are strict laws regarding the manufacture and possession of tantō blades. In response to this, Emerson made a small batch of CQC-6's with a more conventional blade-grind for a Cutlery Show in Seki City. These knives featured the grind on the right-side of the blade as opposed to the left.

Emerson makes a 10% scaled up version of the CQC-6 known as the "Super Six" and a 10% scaled down version retro-named the "CQC-5". Like all of Emerson's custom knives, there is a 13+ year backlog and no new orders for knives are taken.

In November 2001, Emerson made a one-of-a-kind CQC-6 and auctioned it at the New York Custom Knife Show for the benefit of children whose parents had been killed on 9/11/2001: 100% of the proceeds went to this charity. This knife featured polished hardware, hand-checkered micarta scales, and an engraved blade reading: "We shall strike a dagger deep into the heart of such evil".

== CQC-7 ==
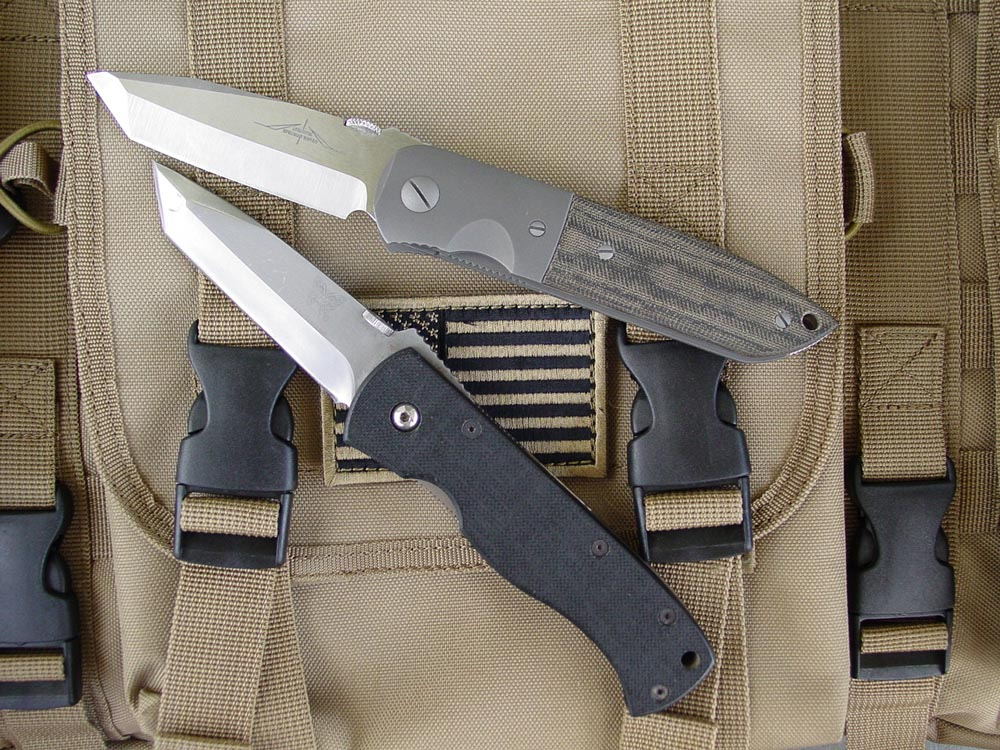
Emerson's custom CQC6 (top) alongside Benchmade's 970 (CQC7)

In 1994, the president of Benchmade Knives, Les DeAsis, approached Emerson to manufacture the CQC6 on a larger scale as a factory production model. Preferring to keep the CQC6 as a custom-only knife, Emerson instead licensed a similar design of his, the CQC-7. Even though it did not have the craftsmanship of a handmade piece of cutlery, it satisfied customers with their own version of Emerson's work, at an affordable price and without the five-year wait. Benchmade manufactured automatic versions of the CQC7 such as the BM9700. Currently Pro-Tech Knives of Santa Fe Springs, California manufactures an automatic version of the CQC-7 in collaboration with Emerson.

The CQC-7 is similar in size and blade profile to the CQC-6 with the main difference being a rear brake at the butt of the handle of the CQC-7 as opposed to the boattail shape of the CQC-6. After the contract with Benchmade expired, Emerson began production of this model in his own factory, Emerson Knives, Inc., in 1999. The production version of the CQC7 is not a handmade knife and features no bolsters or micarta in the handle construction. The handle material on the production model is G-10 fiberglass and the edge of the blade has a secondary bevel. There is a larger and smaller version of this knife known as the "Super CQC-7" and "Mini-CQC-7", respectively and a version with a drop-point blade as opposed to a tanto. An "all titanium" handled version with a framelock was made in 2005 known as the HD-7 to commemorate the tenth anniversary of this model. Emerson makes handmade versions of the CQC-7 with variations similar to the CQC-6 mentioned above.

In May 2013, a non-custom factory-made Emerson CQC-7 knife carried by the Navy SEAL who served as point man on the mission to kill or capture Osama bin Laden was auctioned off for charity, netting over $35,400.
