= Knife =

Tool or weapon with a cutting edge or blade

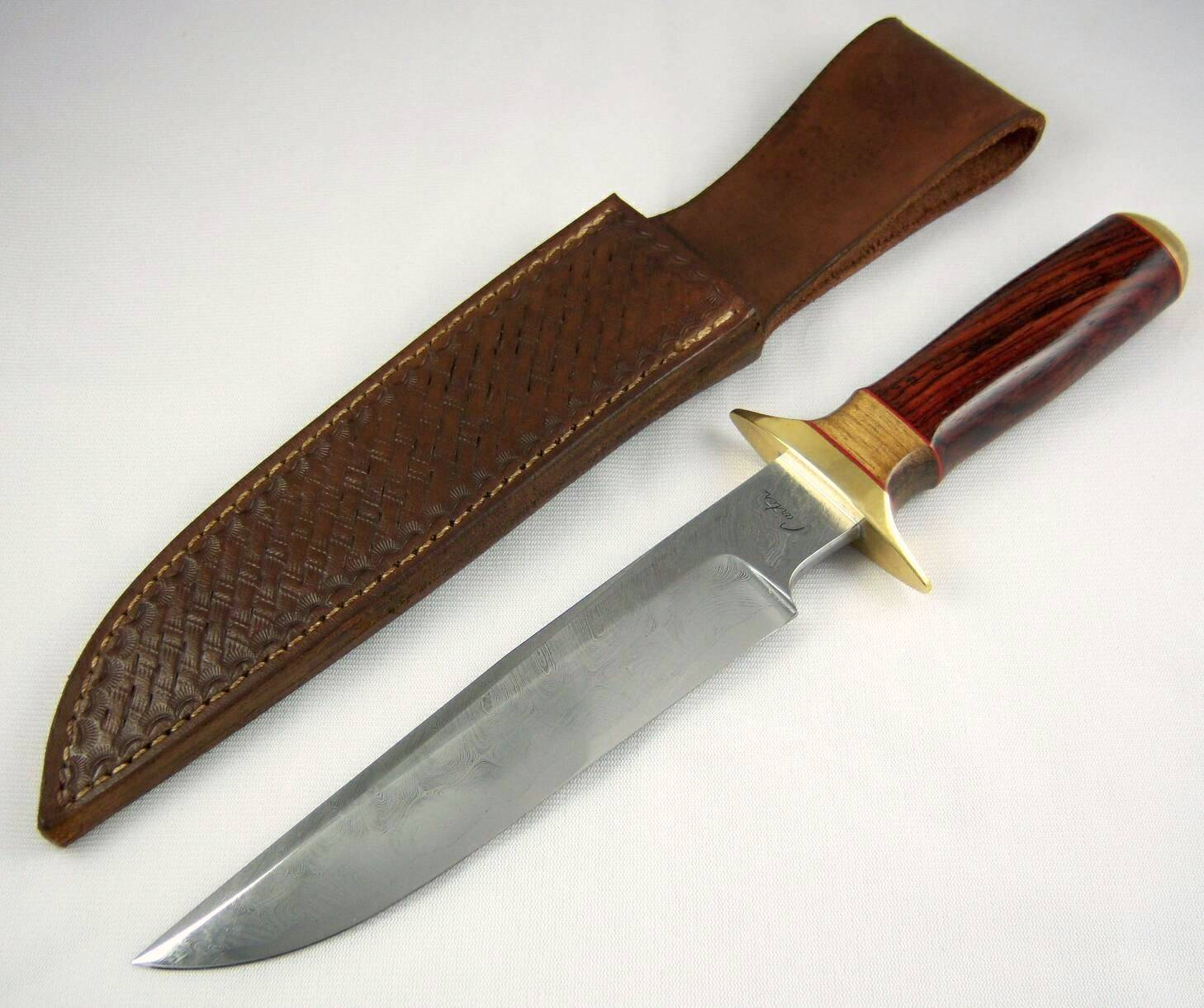
A Bowie knife of pattern-welded steel

A knife (pl.: knives; from Old Norse knifr 'knife, dirk') is a tool or weapon with a cutting edge or blade, usually attached to a handle or hilt. One of the earliest tools used by humanity, knives appeared at least 2.5 million years ago, as evidenced by the Oldowan tools. Originally made of wood, bone, and stone (such as flint and obsidian), over the centuries, in step with improvements in both metallurgy and manufacturing, knife blades have been made from copper, bronze, iron, steel, ceramic, and titanium. Most modern knives have fixed or folding blades, with styles varying by maker and country.

Knives can serve various purposes. Hunters use the hunting knife, soldiers use the combat knife, scouts, campers, and hikers carry the pocketknife; there are kitchen knives for preparing foods (the chef's knife, the paring knife, bread knife, cleaver), table knife (butter knives and steak knives), weapons (daggers or switchblades), knives for throwing or juggling, and knives for religious ceremony or display (the kirpan).

== Parts ==
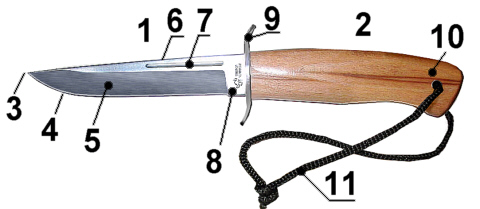
Characteristic parts of a knife

A modern knife consists of:

1. the blade
2. the handle
3. the point – the end of the knife used for piercing
4. the edge – the cutting surface of the knife extending from the point to the heel
5. the grind – the cross section shape of the blade
6. the spine – the thickest section of the blade; on a single-edged knife, the side opposite the edge; on a two-edged knife, more toward the middle
7. the fuller – a groove added to make the blade lighter (optional)
8. the ricasso – the flat section of the blade located at the junction of the blade and the knife's bolster or guard (optional)
9. the guard – the barrier between the blade and the handle which prevents the hand from slipping forward onto the blade and protects the hand from the external forces that are usually applied to the blade during use (optional)
10. the hilt or butt – the end of the handle used for blunt force
11. the lanyard – a strap used to secure the knife to the wrist (optional)

The blade edge can be plain or serrated, or a combination of both. Single-edged knives may have a reverse edge or false edge occupying a section of the spine. These edges are usually serrated and are used to further enhance function.

The handle, used to grip and manipulate the blade safely, may include a tang, a portion of the blade that extends into the handle. Knives are made with partial tangs (extending part way into the handle, known as "stick tangs") or full tangs (extending the full length of the handle, often visible on top and bottom). There is also the enterçado construction method present in antique knives from Brazil, such as the Sorocaban Knife, which consists in riveting a repurposed blade to the ricasso of a bladeless handle. The handle may include a bolster, a piece of heavy material (usually metal) situated at the front or rear of the handle. The bolster, as its name suggests, is used to mechanically strengthen the knife.

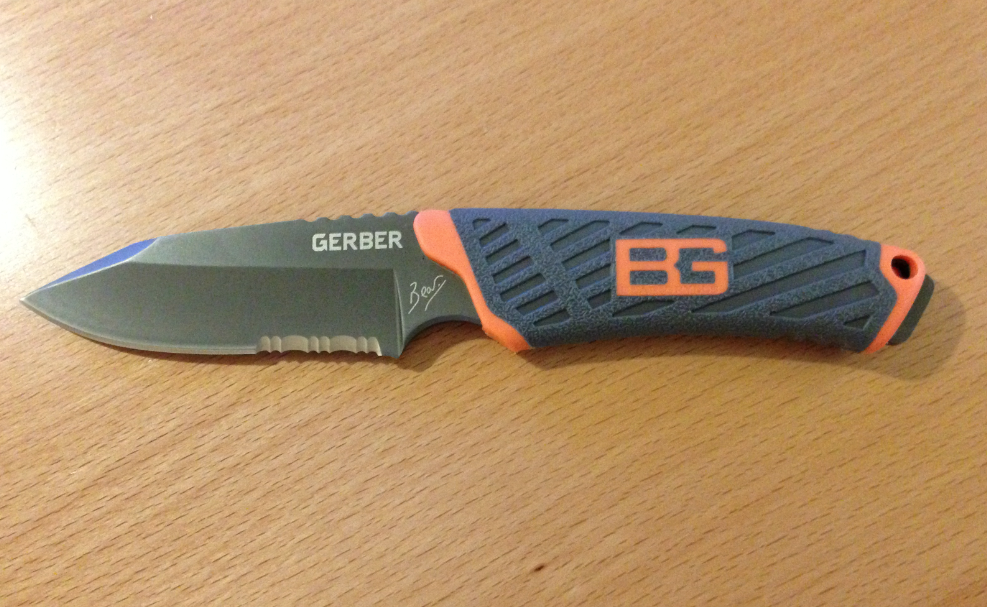
A Gerber-made full-tang survival knife. The metal from the blade extends into the handle.

=== Blade ===
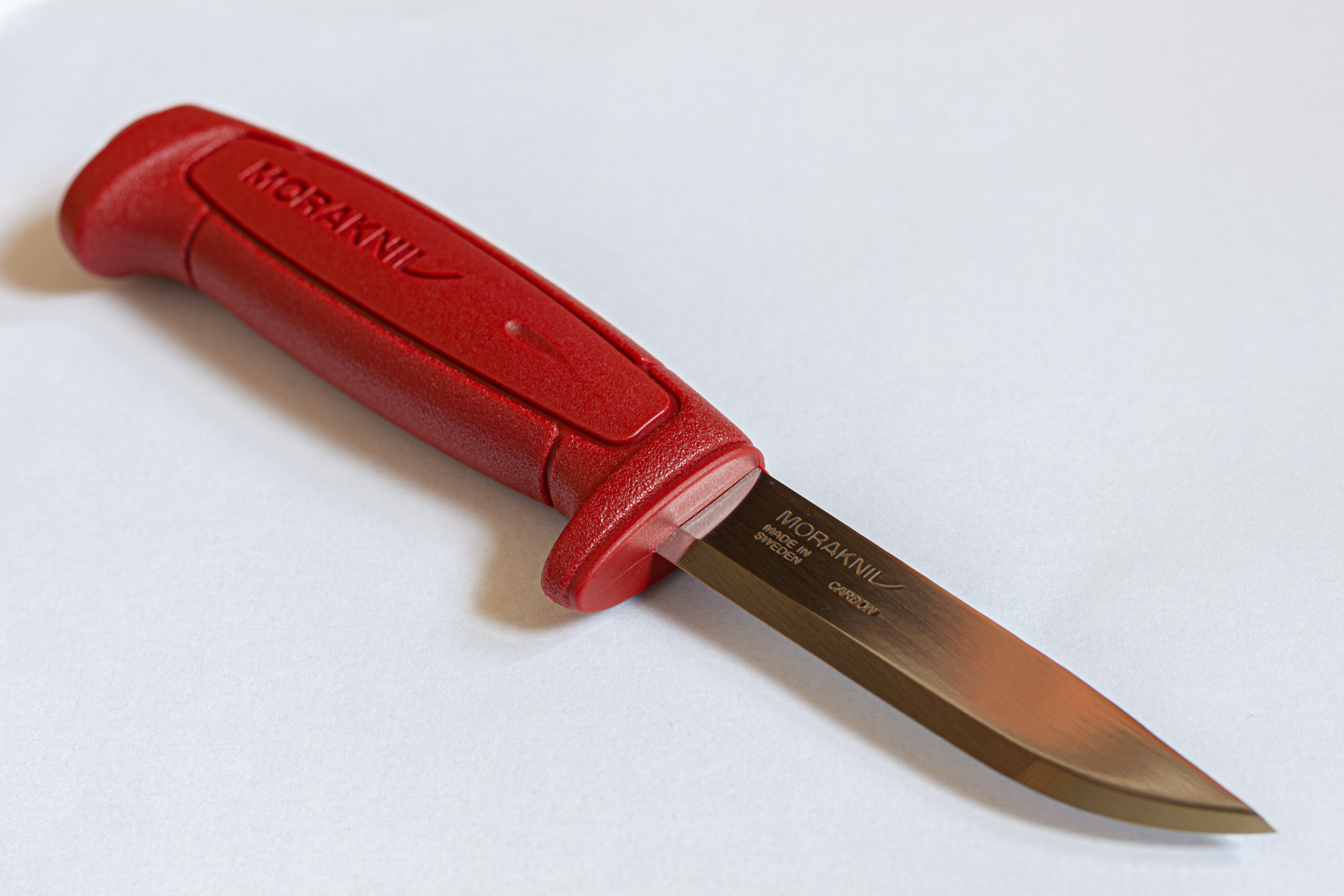
Morakniv carbon steel knife

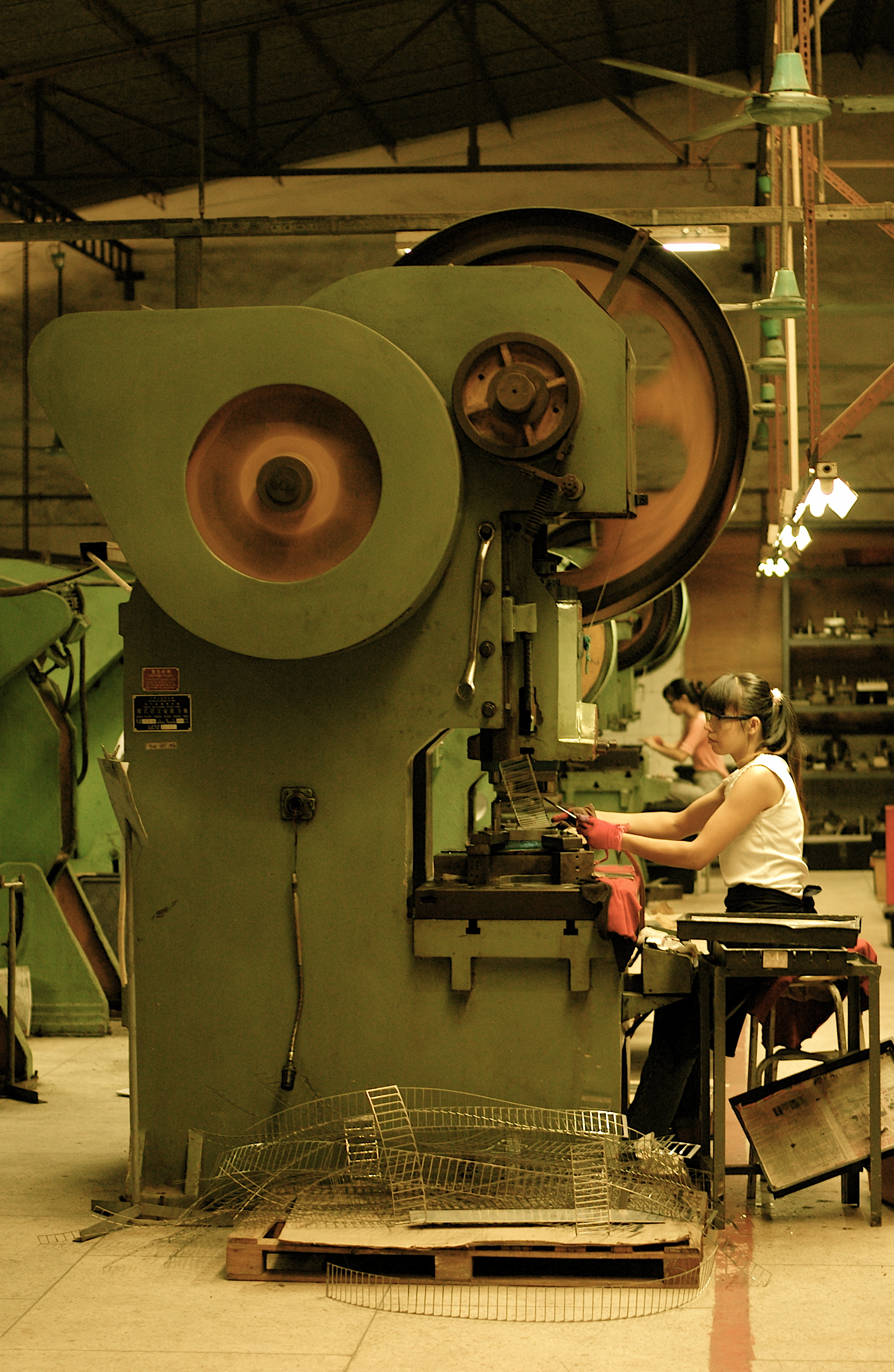
Knife blade mass production

Knife blades can be manufactured from a variety of materials, each of which has advantages and disadvantages. Carbon steel, an alloy of iron and carbon, can be very sharp. It holds its edge well, and remains easy to sharpen, but is vulnerable to rust and stains. Stainless steel is an alloy of iron, chromium, possibly nickel, and molybdenum, with only a small amount of carbon. It is not able to take quite as sharp an edge as carbon steel, but is highly resistant to corrosion. High carbon stainless steel is stainless steel with a higher amount of carbon, intended to incorporate the better attributes of carbon steel and stainless steel. High carbon stainless steel blades do not discolor or stain, and maintain a sharp edge. Laminated blades use multiple metals to create a layered structure, combining the attributes of both. For example, a harder, more brittle steel may be pressed between an outer layer of softer, tougher stainless steel to reduce vulnerability to corrosion. In this case, however, the part most affected by corrosion, the edge, is still vulnerable. Damascus steel is a form of pattern welding with similarities to laminate construction. Layers of different steel types are welded together, but then the stock is manipulated to create patterns in the steel.

Titanium is a metal that has a higher strength-to-weight ratio and more flexible than steel. Although less hard and unable to take as sharp an edge, carbides in the titanium alloy allow them to be heat-treated to a sufficient hardness. Ceramic blades are hard, brittle, lightweight, and do not corrode: they may maintain a sharp edge for years with no maintenance at all, but are fragile and will break if dropped on a hard surface or twisted in use. They can only be sharpened on silicon carbide sandpaper and appropriate grinding wheels. Plastic blades are not sharp and are usually serrated to enable them to cut. They are often disposable.

Knife blades have different profiles

Steel blades are commonly shaped by forging or stock removal. Forged blades are made by heating a single piece of steel, then shaping the metal while hot using a hammer or press. Stock removal blades are shaped by grinding and removing metal. With both methods, after shaping, the steel must be heat treated. This involves heating the steel above its critical point, then quenching the blade to harden it. After hardening, the blade is tempered to remove stresses and make the blade tougher. Mass manufactured kitchen cutlery uses both the forging and stock removal processes. Forging tends to be reserved for manufacturers' more expensive product lines, and can often be distinguished from stock removal product lines by the presence of an integral bolster, though integral bolsters can be crafted through either shaping method.

Knives are sharpened in various ways. Flat ground blades have a profile that tapers from the thick spine to the sharp edge in a straight or convex line. Seen in cross section, the blade would form a long, thin triangle, or where the taper does not extend to the back of the blade, a long thin rectangle with one peaked side. Hollow ground blades have concave, beveled edges. The resulting blade has a thinner edge, so it may have better cutting ability for shallow cuts, but it is lighter and less durable than flat ground blades and will tend to bind in deep cuts. Serrated blade knives have a wavy, scalloped or saw-like blade. Serrated blades are more well suited for tasks that require aggressive 'sawing' motions, whereas plain edge blades are better suited for tasks that require push-through cuts (e.g., shaving, chopping, slicing).

Many knives have holes in the blade for various uses. Holes are commonly drilled in blades to reduce friction while cutting, increase single-handed usability of pocket knives, and, for butchers' knives, allow hanging out of the way when not in use.

==== Fixed-blade features ====
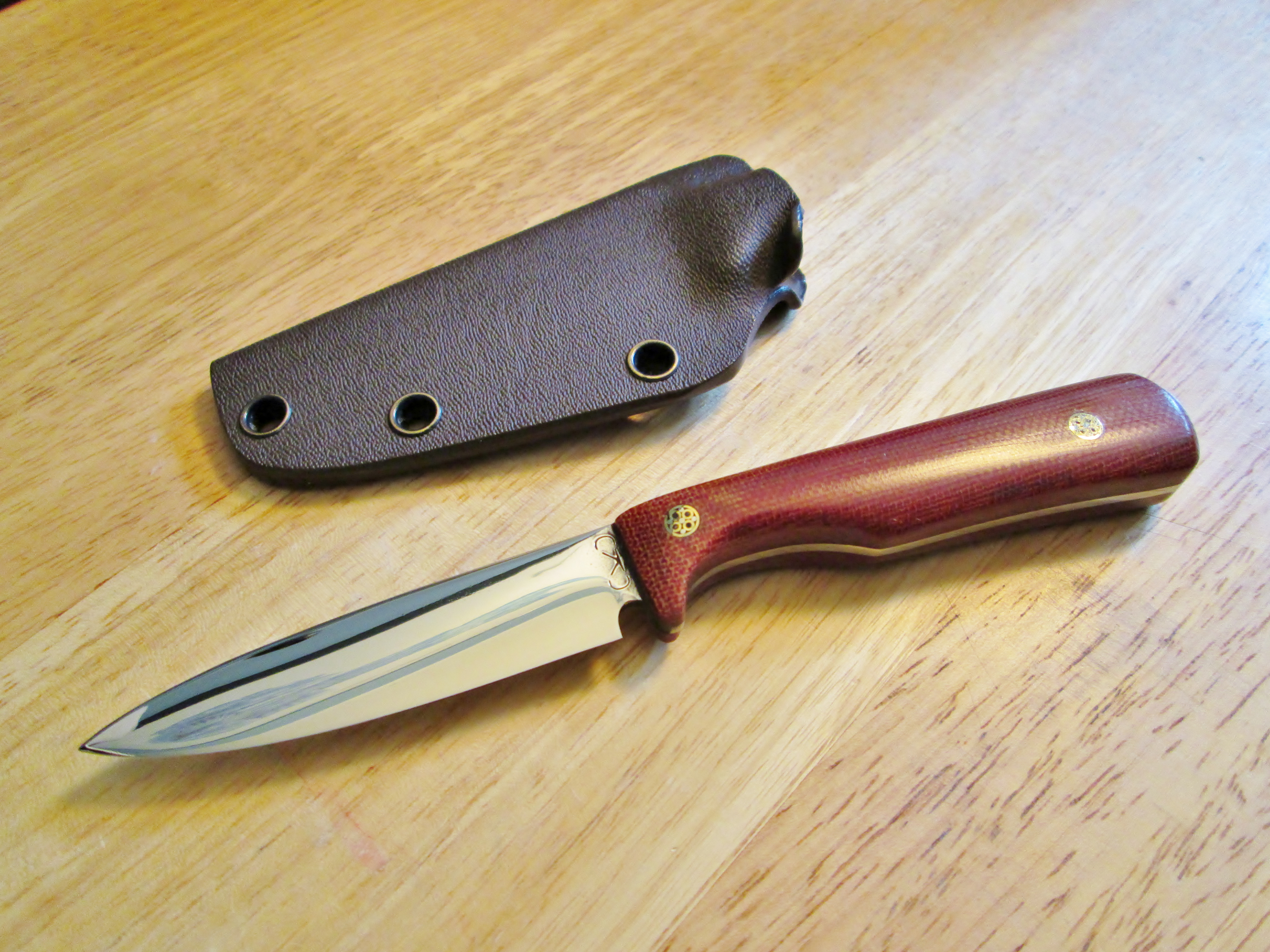
cKc pen knife

A fixed blade knife, sometimes called a sheath knife, does not fold or slide, and is typically stronger due to the tang, the extension of the blade into the handle, and lack of moving parts.

==== Folding blade features ====
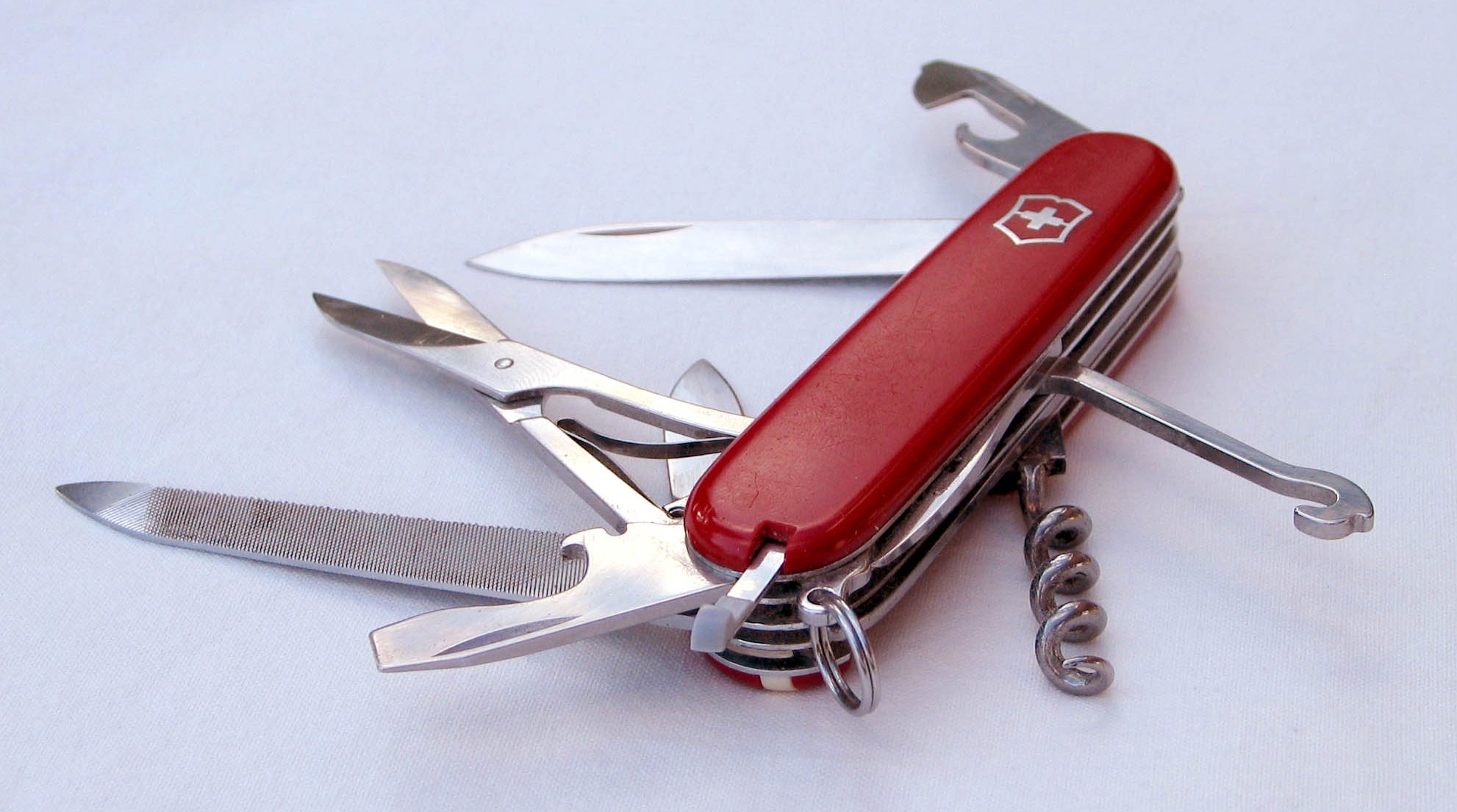
A Swiss Army knife

A folding knife connects the blade to the handle through a pivot, allowing the blade to fold into the handle. To prevent injury to the knife user through the blade accidentally closing on the user's hand, folding knives typically have a locking mechanism. Different locking mechanisms are favored by various individuals for reasons such as perceived strength (lock safety), legality, and ease of use. Popular locking mechanisms include:

- Slip joint – Found most commonly on traditional pocket knives, the opened blade does not lock, but is held in place by a spring device that allows the blade to fold if a certain amount of pressure is applied.
- Lockback – Also known as the spine lock, the lockback includes a pivoted latch affixed to a spring, and can be disengaged only by pressing the latch down to release the blade.
- Linerlock – Invented by Michael Walker, a Linerlock is a folding knife with a side-spring lock that can be opened and closed with one hand without repositioning the knife in the hand. The lock is self-adjusting for wear.
- Compression Lock – A variant of the Liner Lock, it uses a small piece of metal at the tip of the lock to lock into a small corresponding impression in the blade. This creates a lock that does not disengage when the blade is torqued, instead of becoming more tightly locked. It is released by pressing the tab of metal to the side, to allow the blade to be placed into its groove set into the handle.
- Frame Lock – Also known as the integral lock or monolock, this locking mechanism was invented by a custom knifemaker Chris Reeve for the Sebenza as an update to the liner lock. The frame lock works in a manner similar to the liner lock but uses a partial cutout of the actual knife handle, rather than a separate liner inside the handle to hold the blade in place.
- Collar lock – found on Opinel knives.
- Button Lock – Found mainly on automatic knives, this type of lock uses a small push-button to open and release the knife.
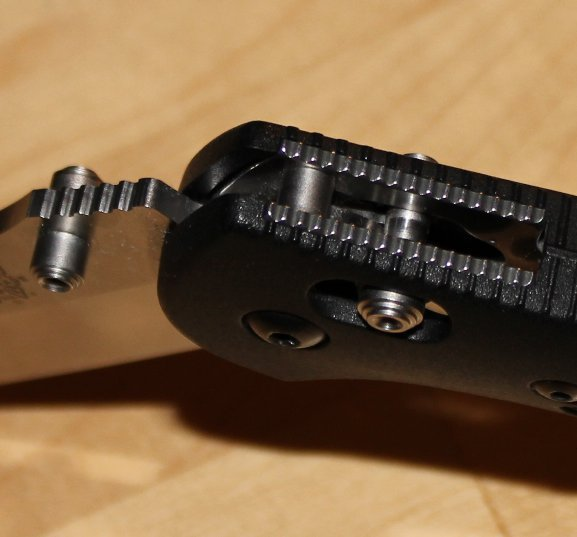
  The Benchmade Axis Lock mechanism
- Axis Lock – A locking mechanism patented by Benchmade Knife Company until 2020. A cylindrical bearing is tensioned such that it will jump between the knife blade and some feature of the handle to lock the blade open.
- Arc Lock – A locking mechanism exclusively licensed to SOG Specialty Knives. It differs from an axis lock in that the cylindrical bearing is tensioned by a rotary spring rather than an axial spring.
- Ball Bearing Lock – A locking mechanism exclusively licensed to Spyderco. This lock is conceptually similar to the axis and arc locks but the bearing is instead a ball bearing.
- Tri-Ad Lock – A locking mechanism exclusively licensed to Cold Steel. It is a form of lockback which incorporates a thick steel stop pin between the front of the latch and the back of the tang to transfer force from the blade into the handle.
- PickLock – A round post on the back base of the blade locks into a hole in a spring tab in the handle. To close, manually lift (pick) the spring tab (lock) off the blade post with your fingers, or in "Italian Style Stilettos" swivel the bolster (hand guard) clockwise to lift the spring tab off the blade post.

Another prominent feature of many folding knives is the opening mechanism. Traditional pocket knives and Swiss Army knives commonly employ the nail nick, while modern folding knives more often use a stud, hole, disk, or flipper located on the blade, all of which have the benefit of allowing the user to open the knife with one hand.

The "wave" feature is another prominent design, which uses a part of the blade that protrudes outward to catch on one's pocket as it is drawn, thus opening the blade; this was patented by Ernest Emerson and is not only used on many of the Emerson knives, but also on knives produced by several other manufacturers, notably Spyderco and Cold Steel.

Automatic or switchblade knives open using the stored energy from a spring that is released when the user presses a button or lever or other actuator built into the handle of the knife. Automatic knives are severely restricted by law in the UK and most American states.

Increasingly common are assisted opening knives which use springs to propel the blade once the user has moved it past a certain angle. These differ from automatic or switchblade knives in that the blade is not released by means of a button or catch on the handle; rather, the blade itself is the actuator. Most assisted openers use flippers as their opening mechanism. Assisted opening knives can be as fast or faster than automatic knives to deploy.

===== Common locking mechanisms =====

In the lock back, as in many folding knives, a stop pin acting on the top (or behind) the blade prevents it from rotating clockwise. A hook on the tang of the blade engages with a hook on the rocker bar which prevents the blade from rotating counter-clockwise. The rocker bar is held in position by a torsion bar. To release the knife the rocker bar is pushed downwards as indicated and pivots around the rocker pin, lifting the hook and freeing the blade.

When negative pressure (pushing down on the spine) is applied to the blade all the stress is transferred from the hook on the blade's tang to the hook on the rocker bar and thence to the small rocker pin. Excessive stress can shear one or both of these hooks rendering the knife effectively useless. Knife company Cold Steel uses a variant of the lock back called the Tri-Ad Lock which introduces a pin in front of the rocker bar to relieve stress on the rocker pin, has an elongated hole around the rocker pin to allow the mechanism to wear over time without losing strength and angles the hooks so that the faces no longer meet vertically.

The bolt in the bolt lock is a rectangle of metal that is constrained to slide only back and forward. When the knife is open a spring biases the bolt to the forward position where it rests above the tang of the blade preventing the blade from closing. Small knobs extend through the handle of the knife on both sides allowing the user to slide the bolt backward freeing the knife to close. The Axis Lock used by knife maker Benchmade is functionally identical to the bolt lock except that it uses a cylinder rather than a rectangle to trap the blade. The Arc Lock by knife maker SOG is similar to the Axis Lock except the cylinder follows a curved path rather than a straight path.

In the liner lock, an L-shaped split in the liner allows part of the liner to move sideways from its resting position against the handle to the centre of the knife where it rests against the flat end of the tang. To disengage, this leaf spring is pushed so it again rests flush against the handle allowing the knife to rotate. A frame lock is functionally identical but instead of using a thin liner inside the handle material uses a thicker piece of metal as the handle and the same split in it allows a section of the frame to press against the tang.

==== Sliding blade features ====
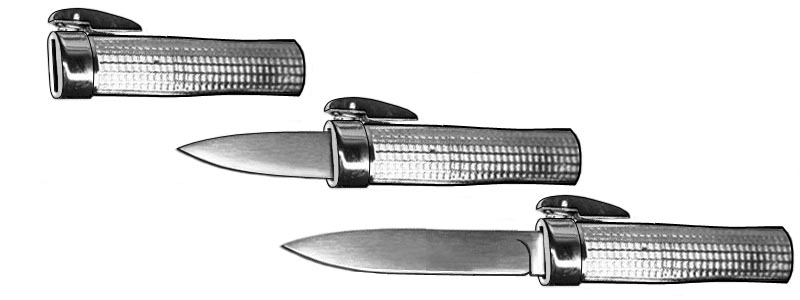
An OTF knife, showing the sliding blade being extended from the handle

A sliding knife is a knife that can be opened by sliding the knife blade out the front of the handle. One method of opening is where the blade exits out the front of the handle point-first and then is locked into place (an example of this is the gravity knife). Another form is an OTF (out-the-front) switchblade, which only requires the push of a button or spring to cause the blade to slide out of the handle and lock into place. To retract the blade back into the handle, a release lever or button, usually the same control as to open, is pressed. A very common form of sliding knife is the sliding utility knife (commonly known as a stanley knife or boxcutter).

=== Handle ===
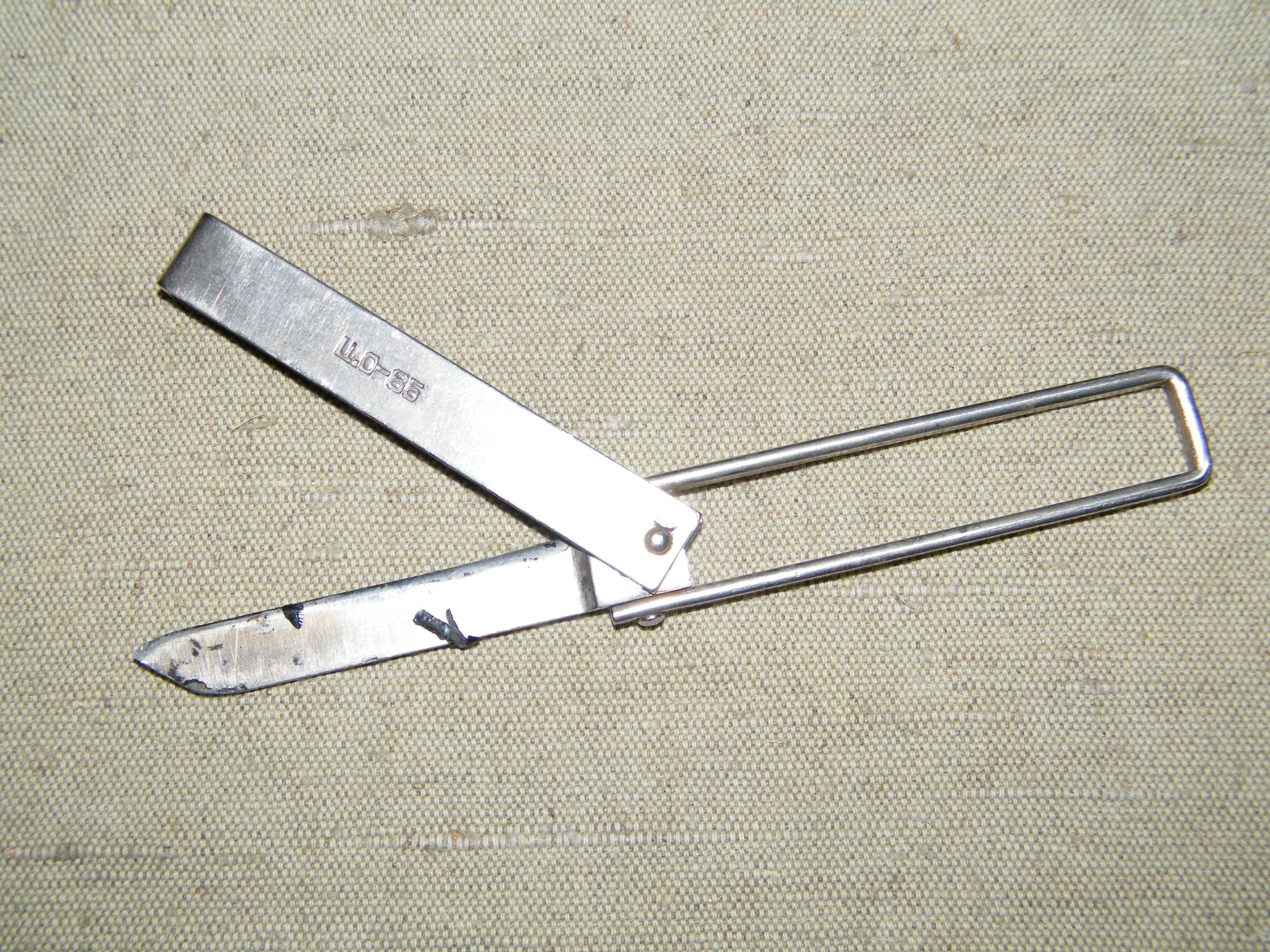
Minsk folding knife with articulated frame grip

The handles of knives can be made from a number of different materials, each of which has advantages and disadvantages. Handles are produced in a wide variety of shapes and styles. Handles are often textured to enhance grip.

- Wood handles provide good grip and are warm in the hand, but are more difficult to care for. They do not resist water well, and will crack or warp with prolonged exposure to water. Modern stabilized and laminated woods have largely overcome these problems. Many beautiful and exotic hardwoods are employed in the manufacture of custom and some production knives. In some countries it is now forbidden for commercial butchers' knives to have wood handles, for sanitary reasons.
- Plastic handles are more easily cared for than wooden handles, but can be slippery and become brittle over time.
- Injection molded handles made from higher grade plastics are composed of polyphthalamide, and when marketed under trademarked names such as Zytel or Grivory, are reinforced with Kevlar or fiberglass. These are often used by major knife manufacturers.
- Rubber handles such as Kraton or Resiprene-C are generally preferred over plastic due to their durable and cushioning nature.
- Micarta is a popular handle material on user knives due to its toughness and stability. Micarta is nearly impervious to water, is grippy when wet, and is an excellent insulator. Micarta has come to refer to any fibrous material cast in resin. There are many varieties of micarta available. One very popular version is a fiberglass impregnated resin called G-10.
- Leather handles are seen on some hunting and military knives, notably the KA-BAR. Leather handles are typically produced by stacking leather washers, or less commonly, as a sleeve surrounding another handle material. Russian manufacturers often use birchbark in the same manner.
- Skeleton handles refers to the practice of using the tang itself as the handle, usually with sections of material removed to reduce weight. Skeleton handled knives are often wrapped with parachute cord or other wrapping materials to enhance grip.
- Stainless steel and aluminum handles are durable and sanitary, but can be slippery. To counter this, premium knife makers make handles with ridges, bumps, or indentations to provide extra grip. Another problem with knives that have metal handles is that, since metal is an excellent heat-conductor, these knives can be very uncomfortable, and even painful or dangerous, when handled without gloves or other protective handwear in (very) cold climates.

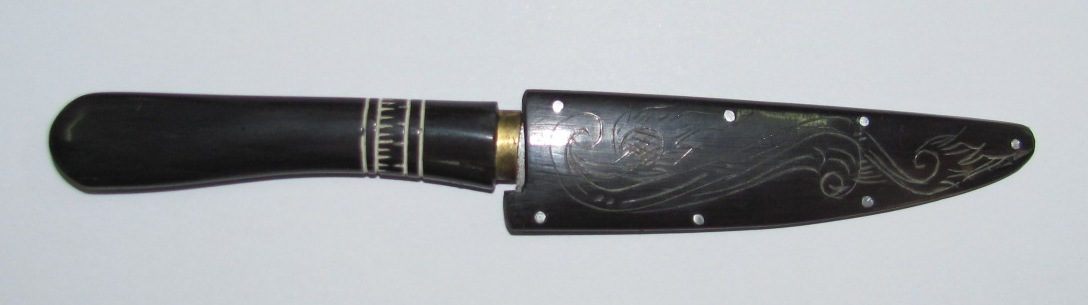
A traditional knife handle made from buffalo horn (Tasikmalaya, Indonesia)

More exotic materials usually only seen on art or ceremonial knives include: Stone, bone, mammoth tooth, mammoth ivory, oosik (walrus penis bone), walrus tusk, antler (often called stag in a knife context), sheep horn, buffalo horn, teeth, and mop (mother of pearl or "pearl"). Many materials have been employed in knife handles.

Handles may be adapted to accommodate the needs of people with disabilities. For example, knife handles may be made thicker or with more cushioning for people with arthritis in their hands. A non-slip handle accommodates people with palmar hyperhidrosis.

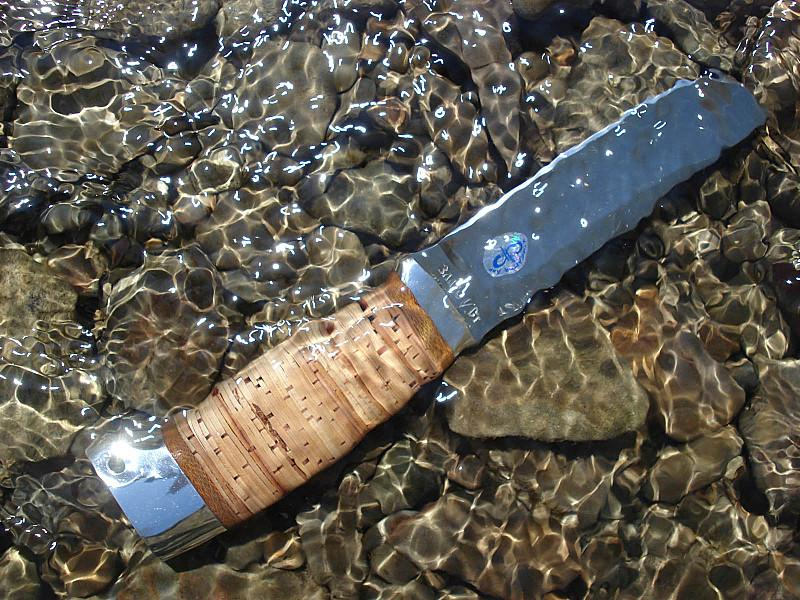
Birchbark knife handle

== Types ==
=== Weapons ===
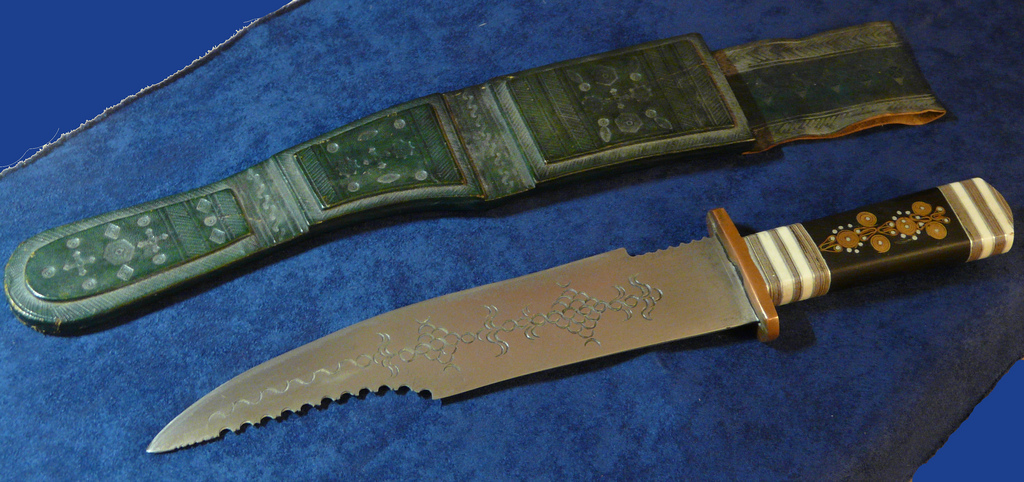
A large traditional Tuareg knife

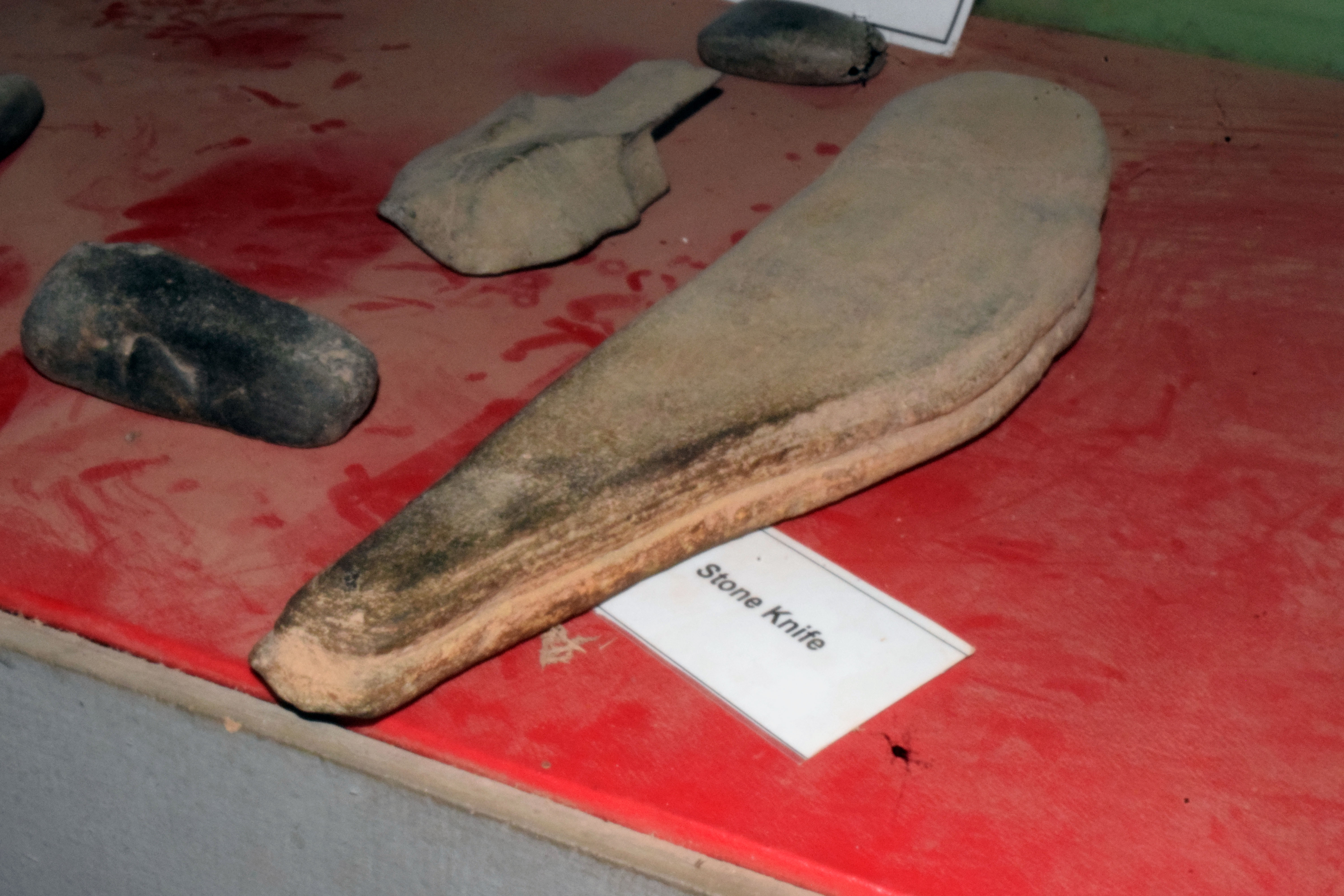
Knife from the stone age, Nok, Nigeria

As a weapon, the knife is universally adopted as an essential tool. It is the essential element of a knife fight. For example:

- Ballistic knife: A specialized combat knife with a detachable gas- or spring-propelled blade that can be fired to a distance of several feet or meters by pressing a trigger or switch on the handle.
- Bayonet: A knife-shaped close-quarters combat weapon designed to attach to the muzzle of a rifle or similar weapon.
- Butterfly knife: A folding pocket knife also known as a "balisong" or "batangas" with two counter-rotating handles where the blade is concealed within grooves in the handles.
- Combat knife: Any knife intended to be used by soldiers in the field, as a general-use tool, but also for fighting.
- Dagger: A single-edged or double-edged combat knife with a central spine and edge(s) sharpened their full length, used primarily for thrusting or stabbing. Variations include the Stiletto and Push dagger. See List of daggers for a more detailed list.
- Fighting knife: A knife with a blade designed to inflict a lethal injury in a physical confrontation between two or more individuals at very short range (grappling distance). Well known examples include the Bowie knife, Ka-Bar combat knife, and the Fairbairn–Sykes fighting knife.
- Machete: A knife with a broad blade designed for chopping, often curved either in a convex or concave fashion.
- Shiv: A crudely made homemade knife out of everyday materials, especially prevalent in prisons among inmates. An alternate name in some prisons is shank.
- Sword: An evolution of the knife with a lengthened and strengthened blade used primarily for mêlée combat and hunting.
- Throwing knife: A knife designed and weighted for throwing.
- Trench knife: Purpose-made or improvised knives, intended for close-quarter fighting, particularly in trench warfare; some have a d-shaped integral hand guard.

=== Sports equipment ===
- Throwing knife: A knife designed and weighted for throwing.

=== Utensils ===
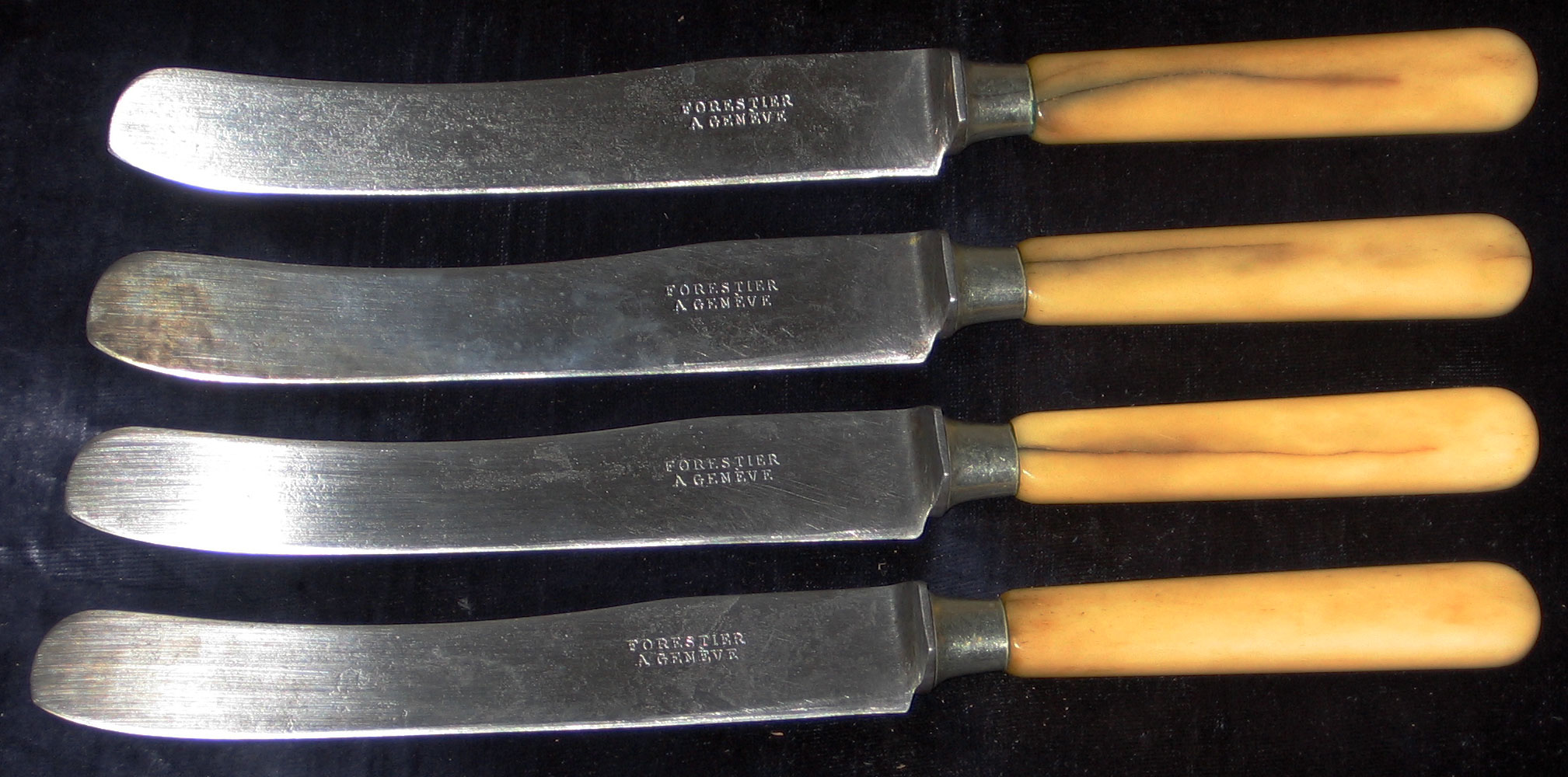
Table knives

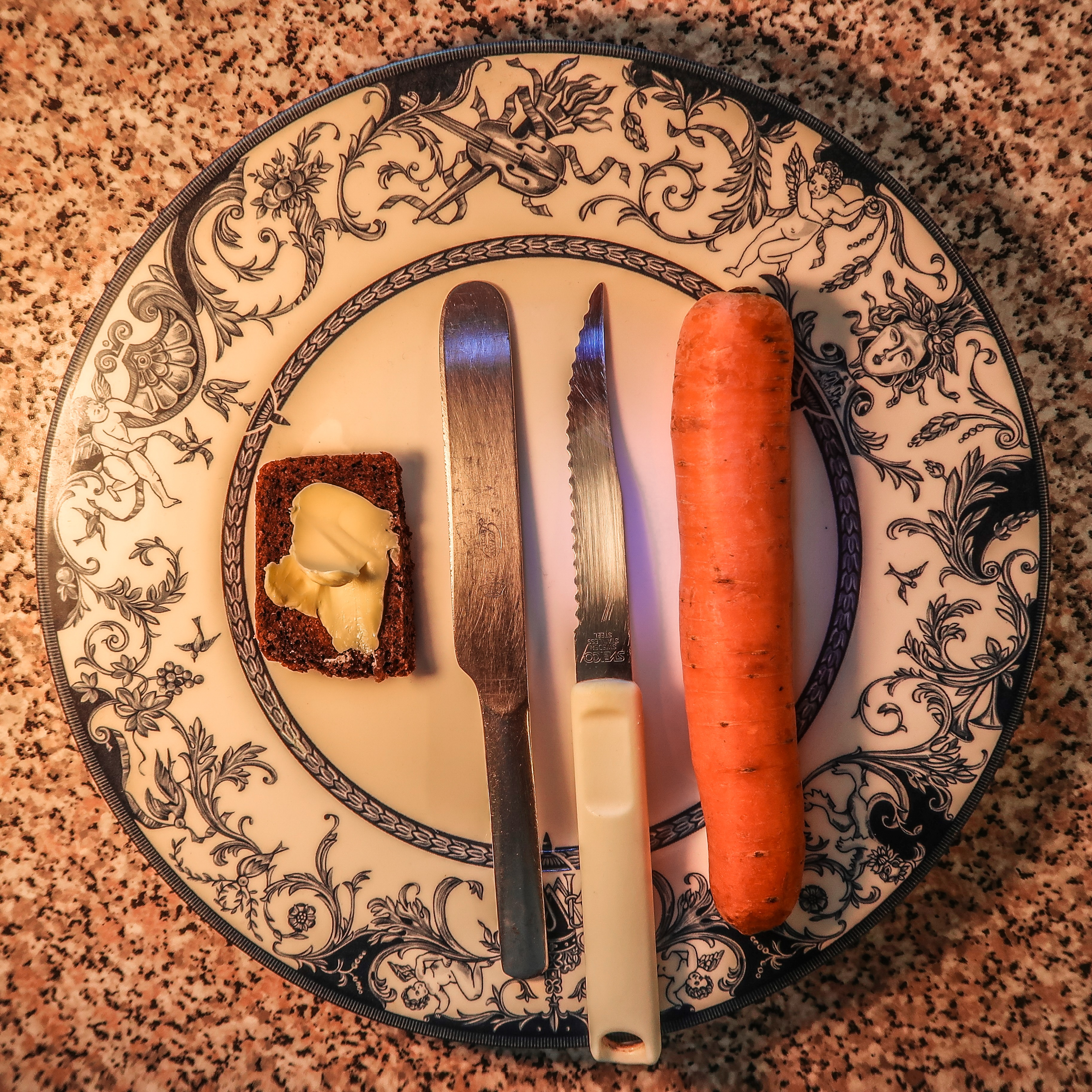
A butter knife (on the left) is used to spread butter, while a kitchen knife (on the right) is sharp enough to slice a carrot.

A primary aspect of the knife as a tool includes dining, used either in food preparation or as cutlery. Examples of this include:

- Bread knife: A knife with a serrated blade for cutting bread
- Boning knife: A knife used for removing the bones of poultry, meat, and fish.
- Fillet Knife: A knife a with flexible blade used to separate meat or fish from bones.
- Butcher's Knife: A knife designed and used primarily for the butchering and/or dressing of animals.
- Carving knife: A knife for carving large cooked meats such as poultry, roasts, hams, and other large cooked meats.
- Canelle or Channel knife: The notch of the blade is used to cut a twist from a citrus fruit, usually in the preparation of cocktails
- Chef's knife: Also known as a French knife, a cutting tool used in preparing food
- Cleaver: A large knife that varies in its shape but usually resembles a rectangular-bladed hatchet. It is used mostly for hacking through bones as a kitchen knife or butcher knife, and can also be used for crushing via its broad side, typically garlic.
- Electric knife: An electrical device consisting of two serrated blades that are clipped together, providing a sawing action when powered on
- Kitchen knife: Any knife, including the chef's knife, that is intended to be used in food preparation
- Oyster knife: Has a short, thick blade for prying open oyster shells
- Mezzaluna: A two-handled arc-shaped knife used in a rocking motion as an herb chopper or for cutting other foods
- Paring or Coring Knife: A knife with a small but sharp blade used for cutting out the cores from fruit.
- Rocker knife is a knife that cuts with a rocking motion, which is primarily used by people whose disabilities prevent them from using a fork and knife simultaneously.
- Table knife or Case knife: A piece of cutlery, either a butter knife, steak knife, or both, that is part of a table setting, accompanying the fork and spoon

=== Tools ===
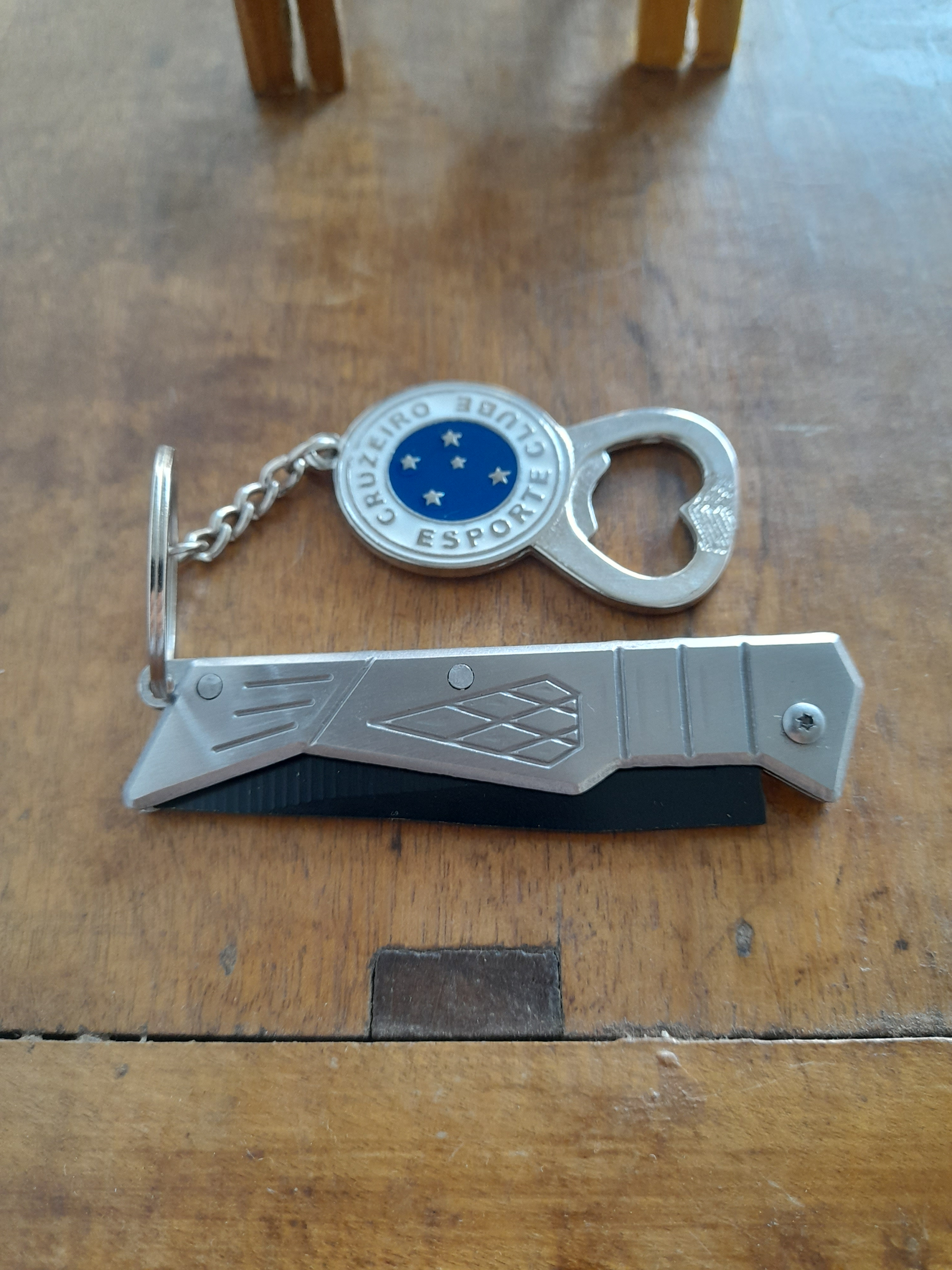
Western

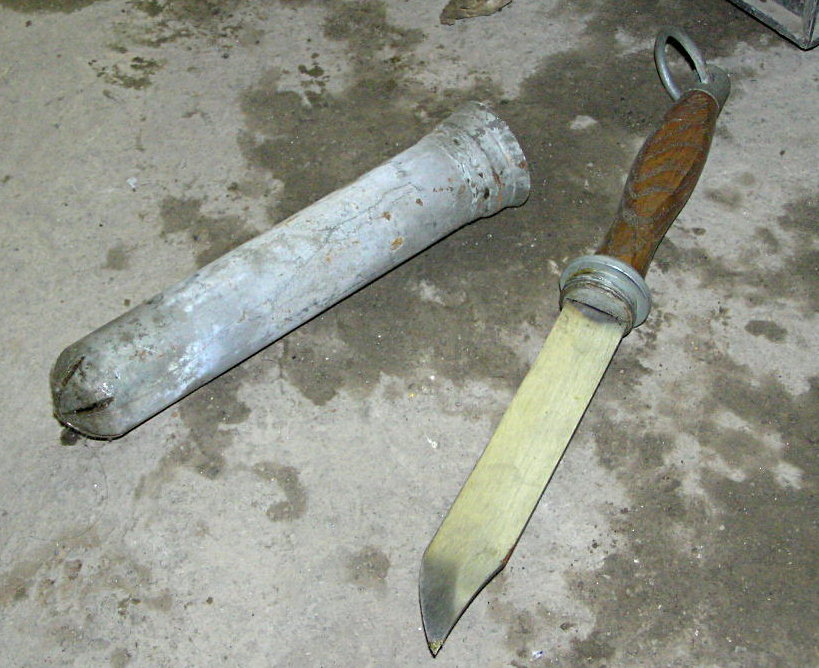
Diver's knife from Three bolt equipment

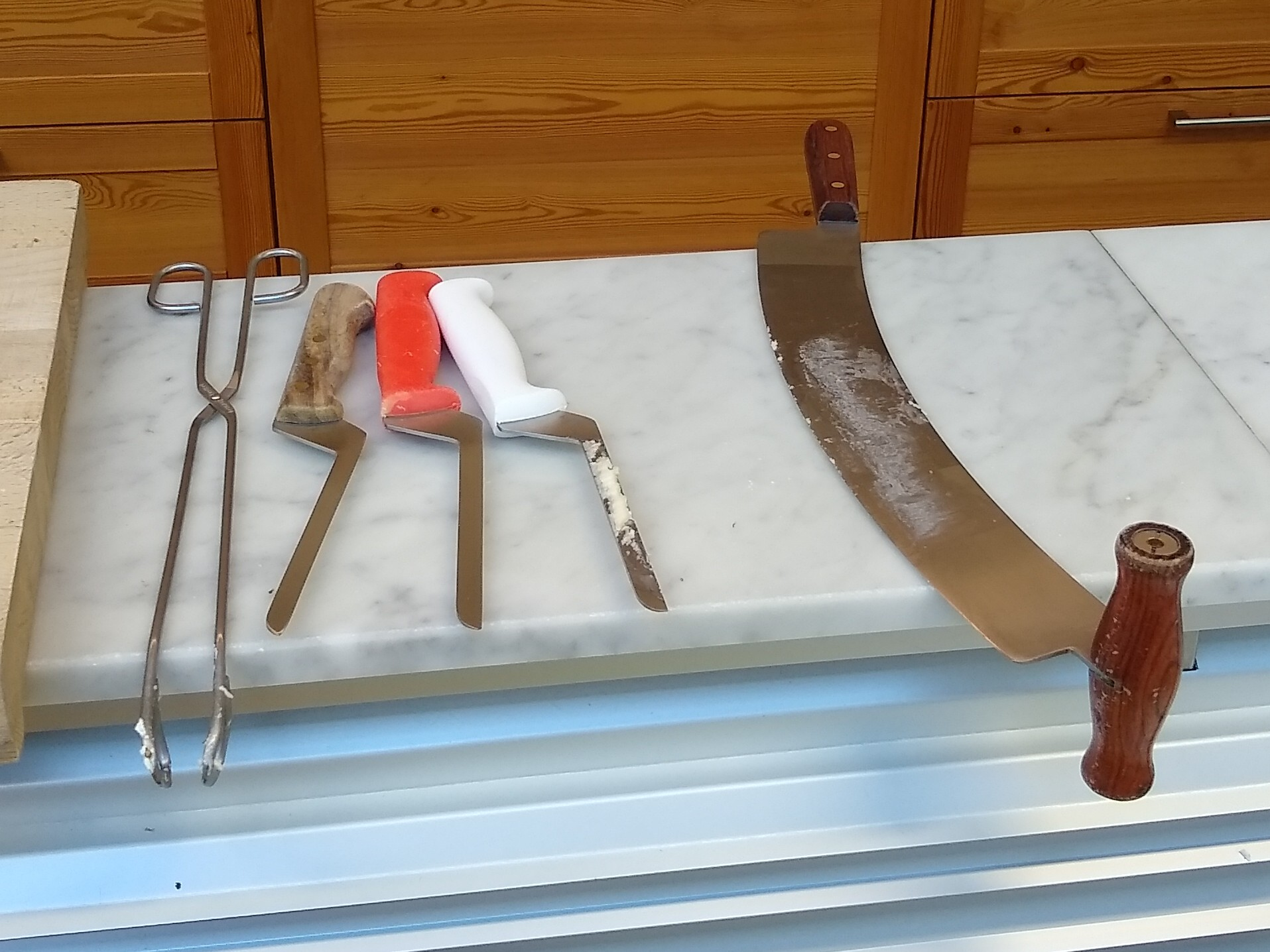
Knives for cutting cheese

As a utility tool the knife can take many forms, including:

- Bowie knife: Commonly, any large sheath knife, or a specific style of large knife popularized by Jim Bowie.

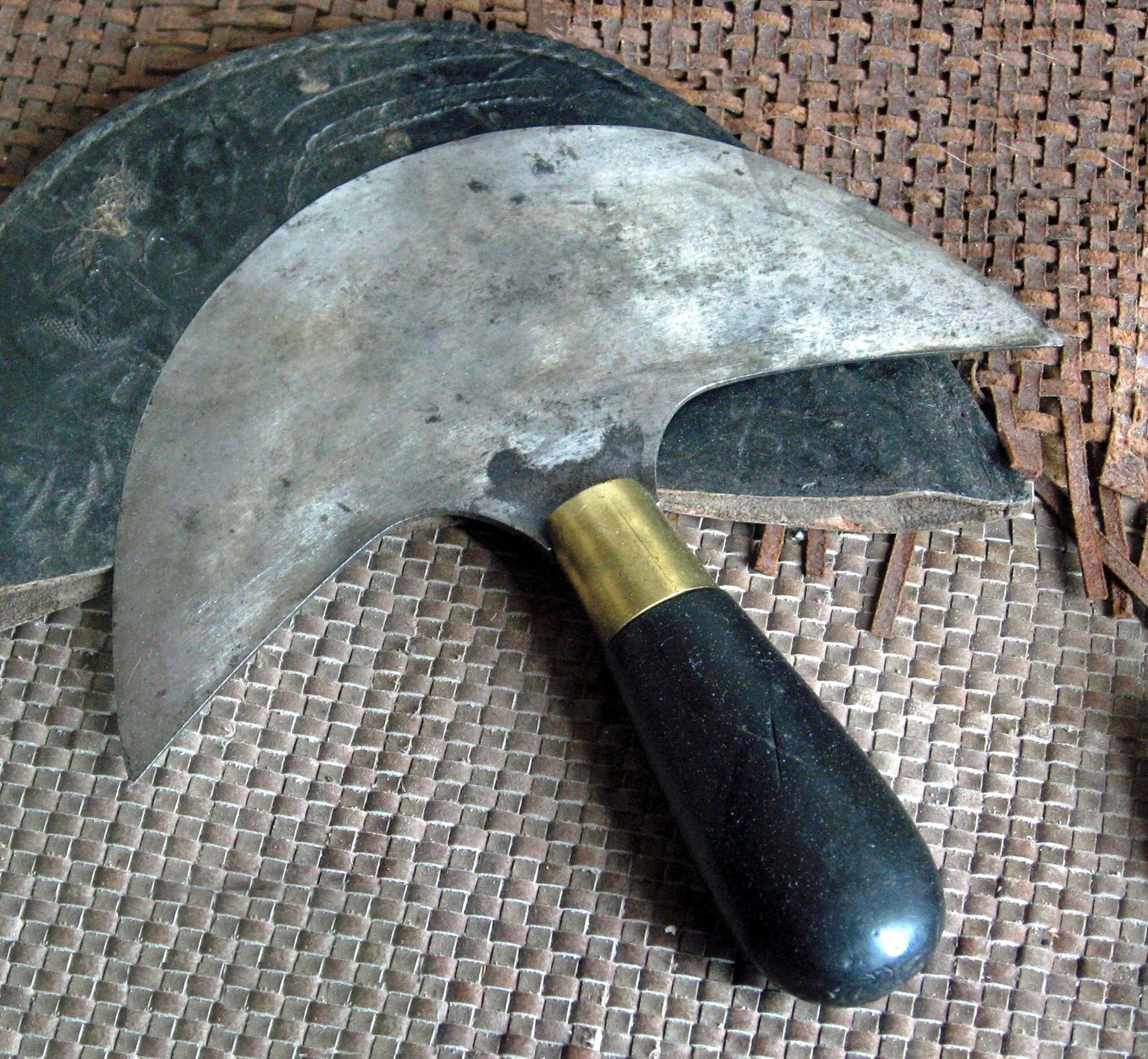
A Head knife (Round knife).

- Bushcraft knife: A sturdy, normally fixed blade knife used while camping in the wilderness.
- Camping knife: A camping knife is used for camping and survival purposes in a wilderness environment.
- Head knife or Round knife: A knife with a semicircular blade used since antiquity to cut leather.
- Crooked knife: Sometimes referred to as a "curved knife", "carving knife" or in the Algonquian language the "mocotaugan" is a utilitarian knife used for carving.
- Diver's knife: A knife adapted for use in diving and water sports and a necessary part of standard diving dress.
- Electrician's knife: A short-bladed knife used to cut electrical insulation. Also, a folding knife with a large screw driver as well as a blade. Typically the screwdriver locks, but the blade may not lock.
- Folding knife: A folding knife is a knife with one or more blades that fit inside the handle that can still fit in a pocket. It is also known as a jackknife or jack-knife.
- Hunting knife: A knife used to dress large game.
- Kiridashi: A small Japanese knife having a chisel grind and a sharp point, used as a general-purpose utility knife.
- Linoleum knife: is a small knife that has a short, stiff blade with a curved point and a handle and is used to cut linoleum or other sheet materials.
- Machete: A large heavy knife used to cut through thick vegetation such as sugar cane or jungle undergrowth; it may be used as an offensive weapon.
- Marking knife: A woodworking tool used for marking out workpieces.
- Palette knife: A knife, or frosting spatula, lacking a cutting edge, used by artists for tasks such as mixing and applying paint and in cooking for spreading icing.
- Paper knife: Or a "letter opener" it is a knife made of metal or plastic, used for opening mail.
- Pocketknife: a folding knife designed to be carried in a pants pocket. Subtypes include:
  - Lockback knife: a folding knife with a mechanism that locks the blade into the open position, preventing accidental closure while in use
  - Multi-tool and Swiss Army knife, which combine a folding knife blade with other tools and implements, such as pliers, scissors, or screwdrivers
- Produce knife: A knife with a rectangular profile and a blunt front edge used by grocers to cut produce.
- Rigging knife: A knife used to cut rigging in sailing vessels.
- Scalpel: A medical knife, used to perform surgery.
- Straight razor: A reusable knife blade used for shaving hair.
- Survival knife: A sturdy knife, sometimes with a hollow handle filled with survival equipment.
- Switchblade: A knife with a folding blade that springs out of the grip when a button or lever on the grip is pressed.
- Utility knife: A short knife with a replaceable (typically) triangular blade, used for cutting sheet materials including card stock, paperboard, and corrugated fiberboard, also called a boxcutter knife or boxcutter
- Wood carving knife and whittling knives: Knives used to shape wood in the arts of wood carving and whittling, often with short, thin replaceable blades for better control.
- Craft knife: A scalpel-like form of non-retractable utility knife with a (typically) long handle and a replaceable pointed blade, used for precise, clean cutting in arts and crafts, often called an X-acto knife in the US and Canada after the popular brand name.

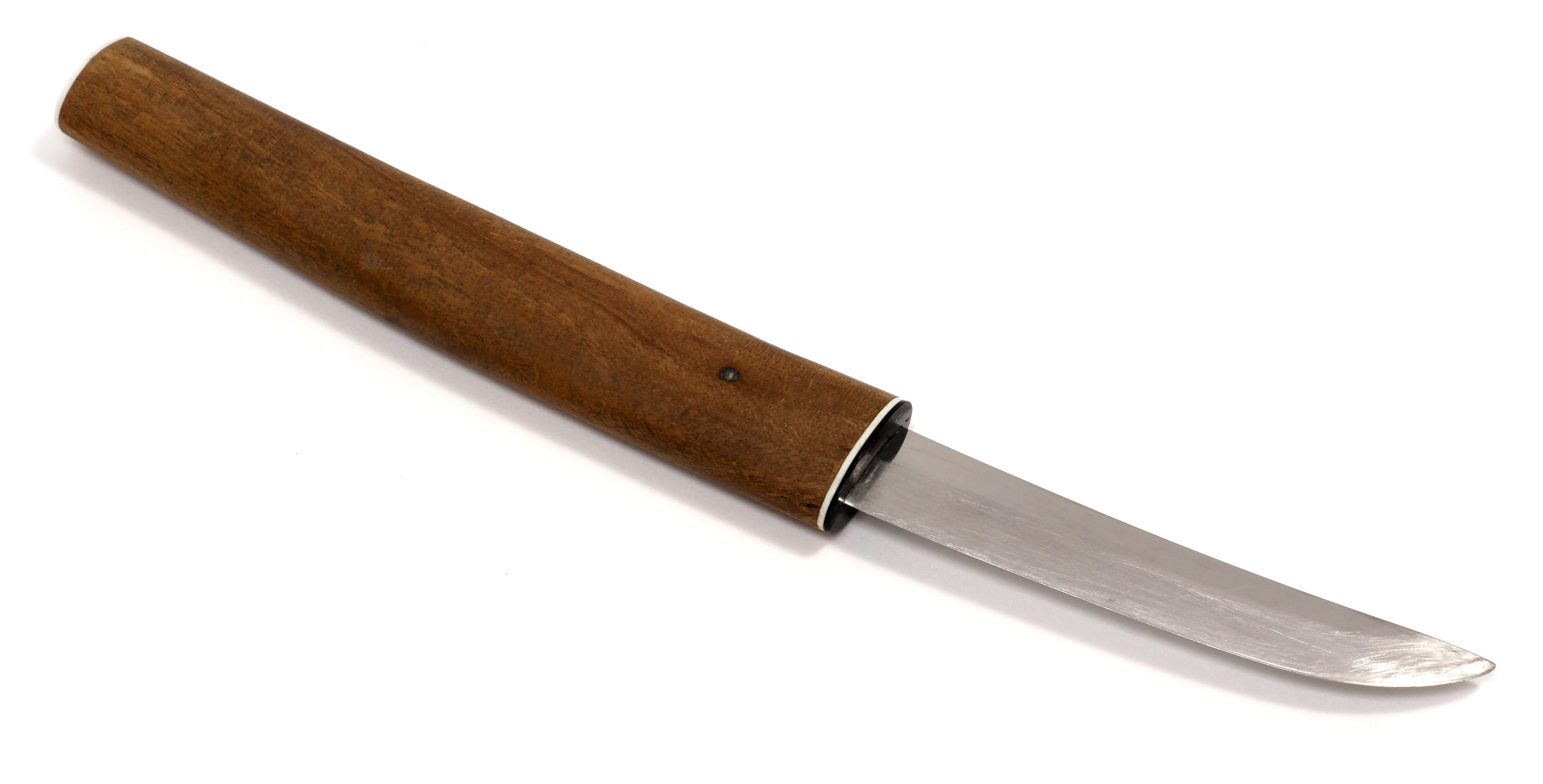
A simple letter opener, or paper knife

=== Traditional and religious implements ===
- Athame: A typically black-handled and double-edged ritual knife used in Wicca and other derivative forms of Neopagan witchcraft. (see also Boline).
- Dirk: A long bladed thrusting dagger worn by Scottish Highlanders for customary and ceremonial purposes.
- Katar: An Indian push dagger sometimes used ceremonially.
- Kilaya: A dagger used in Tibetan Buddhist rituals.
- Kirpan: A ceremonial knife that all baptised Sikhs must wear as one of the five visible symbols of the Sikh faith (Kakars)
- Kris: A dagger used in Indo-Malay cultures, often by nobility and sometimes in religious rituals
- Kukri: A Nepalese knife used as a tool and weapon
- Maguro bōchō: A traditional Japanese knife with a long specialized blade that is used to fillet large ocean fish.
- Puukko: A traditional Finnish style woodcraft belt-knife used as a tool rather than a weapon
- Seax: A Germanic single-edged knife, dagger or short sword used both as a tool and as a weapon.
- Secespita: A sacrificial knife used in ancient Rome.
- Sgian-dubh: A small knife traditionally worn with the Highland and Isle dress (Kilt) of Scotland.
- Ulu: An Inuit woman's all-purpose knife with a handle directly above a highly curved blade.
- Yakutian knife: A traditional Yakuts knife used as a tool for wood carving and meat or fish cutting. Can be used as a part of yakutian ethnic costume.

== Rituals and superstitions ==
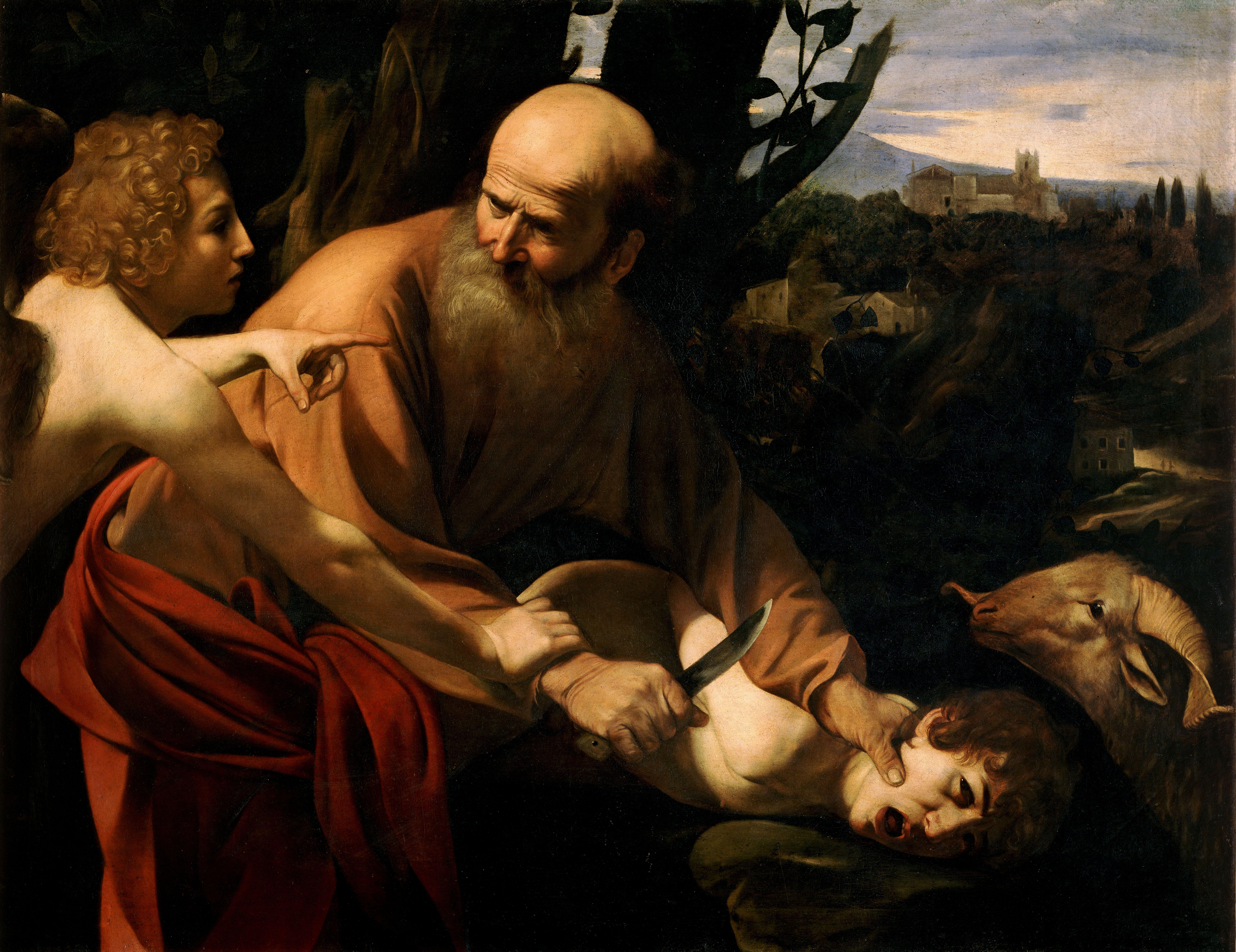
The Sacrifice of Isaac by Caravaggio, (1590–1610; Oil on canvas; Uffizi). Abraham is holding the sacrificial knife.

The knife plays a significant role in some cultures through ritual and superstition, as the knife was an essential tool for survival since early man. Knife symbols can be found in various cultures to symbolize all stages of life; for example, a knife placed under the bed while giving birth is said to ease the pain, or, stuck into the headboard of a cradle, to protect the baby; knives were included in some Anglo-Saxon burial rites, so the dead would not be defenseless in the next world. The knife plays an important role in some initiation rites, and many cultures perform rituals with a variety of knives, including the ceremonial sacrifices of animals. Samurai warriors, as part of bushido, could perform ritual suicide, or seppuku, with a tantō, a common Japanese knife. An athame, a ceremonial knife, is used in Wicca and derived forms of neopagan witchcraft.

In Greece, a black-handled knife placed under the pillow is used to keep away nightmares. As early as 1646 reference is made to a superstition of laying a knife across another piece of cutlery being a sign of witchcraft. A common belief is that if a knife is given as a gift, the relationship of the giver and recipient will be severed. Something such as a small coin, dove or a valuable item is exchanged for the gift, rendering "payment."

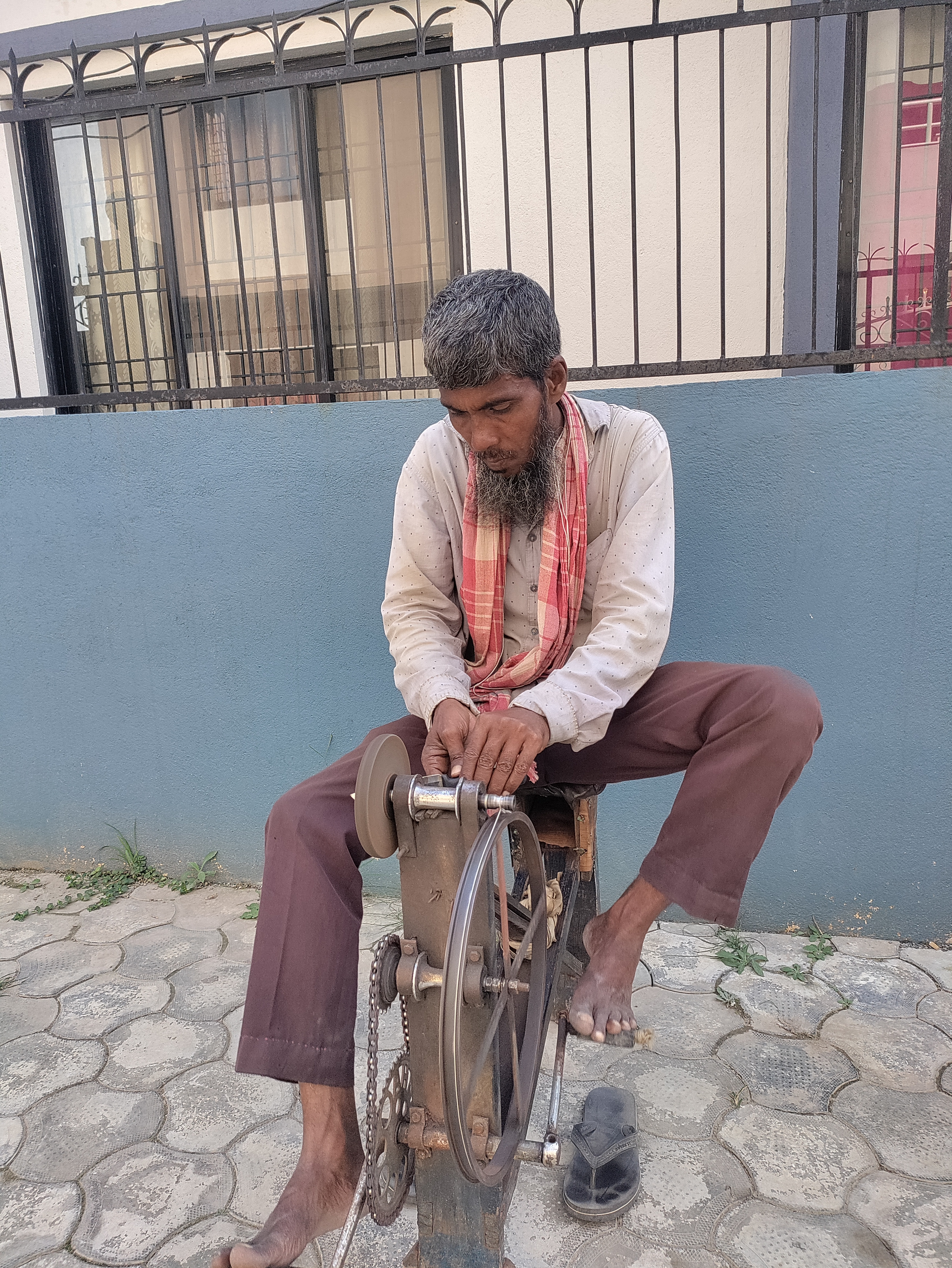
A man sharpening a knife in Nepal using a traditional method

== Legislation ==
Some types of knives are restricted by law, and carrying of knives may be regulated, because they are often used in crime, although restrictions vary greatly by jurisdiction and type of knife. For example, some laws prohibit carrying knives in public while other laws prohibit possession of certain knives, such as switchblades.

== See also ==
- Arbelos, a geometric figure named after a shoemaker's knife
- Dirk
- Knife fight
- List of culinary knife cuts
- Sword
- Scissor grinder
- Zombie knife
