= Machete =

Type of broad and heavy knife

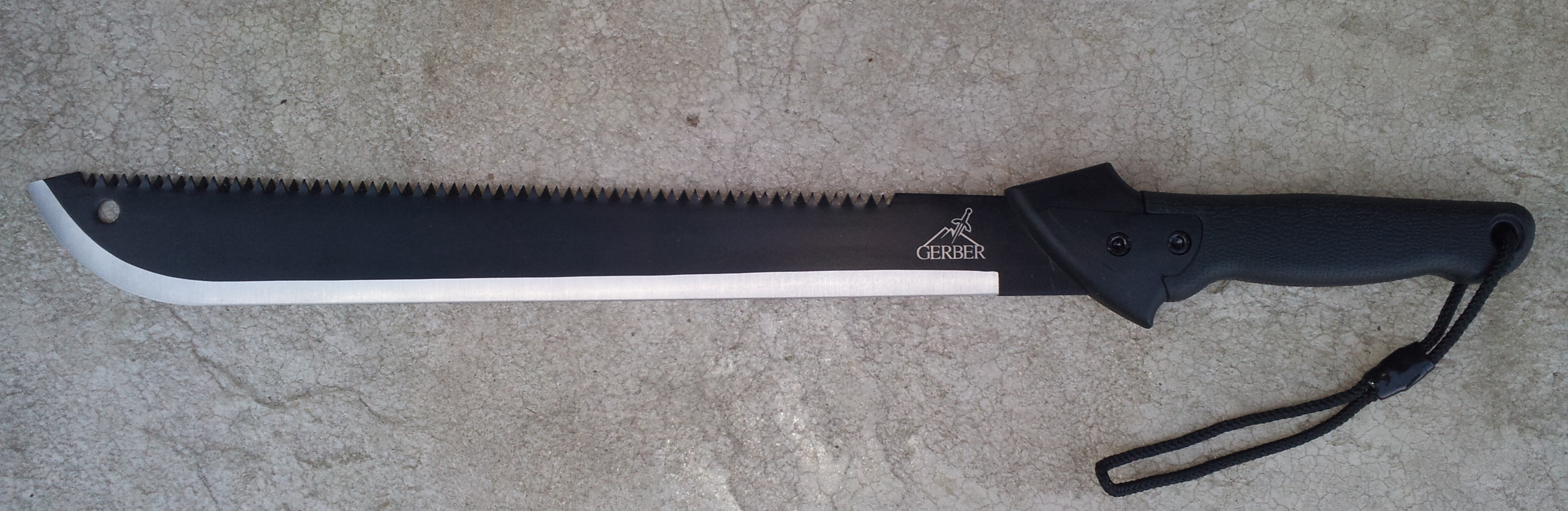
Machete/saw combo

A machete (/məˈʃɛti/; Spanish pronunciation: [maˈtʃete]) is a broad blade originating from Central America. It is used either as an agricultural implement similar to an axe, or in combat like a long-bladed knife. The blade is typically 30 to 66 centimetres (12 to 26 in) long and usually under 3 millimetres (1/8 in) thick. In the Spanish language, the word is possibly a diminutive form of the word macho, which was used to refer to sledgehammers. Alternatively, its origin may be machaera, the name given by the Greeks and Romans to the falcata. It is the origin of the English language equivalent term matchet, though this is rarely used. In much of the English-speaking Caribbean, such as Jamaica, Barbados, Guyana, Grenada, and Trinidad and Tobago, the term cutlass is used for these agricultural tools.

== Uses ==
=== Agriculture ===
In various tropical and subtropical countries, the machete is frequently used to cut through rainforest undergrowth and for agricultural purposes (e.g. cutting sugar cane). Besides this, in Latin America a common use is for such household tasks as cutting large foodstuffs into pieces—much as a cleaver is used—or to perform crude cutting tasks, such as making simple wooden handles for other tools. It is common to see people using machetes for other jobs, such as splitting open coconuts, yard work, removing small branches and plants, chopping food, and clearing bushes.

Machetes are often considered tools and used by adults. However, many hunter–gatherer societies and cultures surviving through subsistence agriculture begin teaching babies to use sharp tools, including machetes, before their first birthdays.

=== Warfare ===
People in uprisings sometimes use these weapons. For example, the Boricua Popular Army are unofficially called macheteros because of the machete-wielding laborers of sugar cane fields of past Puerto Rico.

Many of the killings in the 1994 Rwandan genocide were performed with machetes, and they were the primary weapon used by the Interahamwe militias there. Machetes were also a distinctive tool and weapon of the Haitian Tonton Macoute.

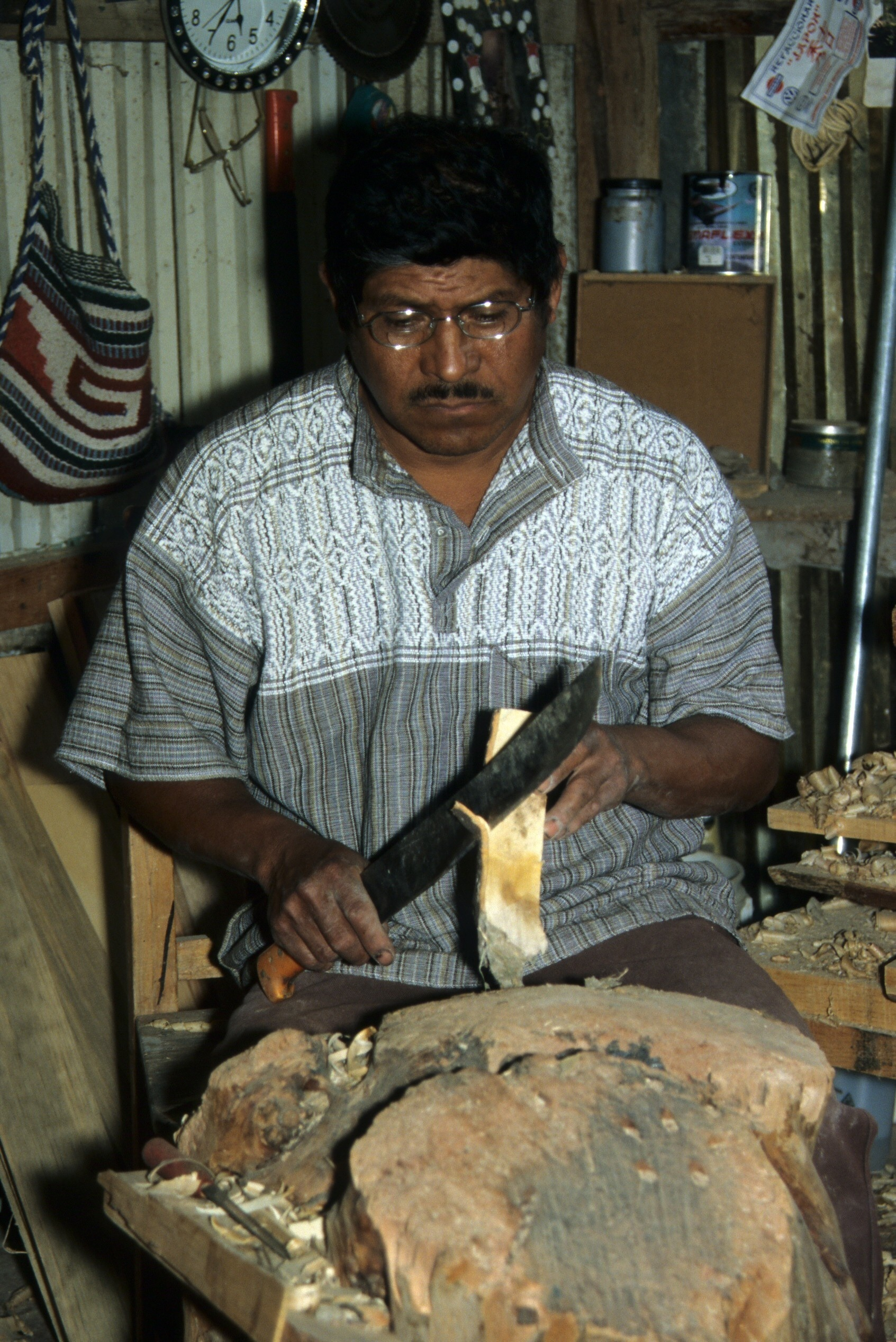
Mexican artisan Agustín Cruz Tinoco using a machete to carve wood

In 1762, the British captured Havana in a lengthy siege during the Seven Years' War. Volunteer militiamen led by Pepe Antonio, a Guanabacoa councilman, were issued with machetes during the unsuccessful defense of the city. The machete was also the most iconic weapon during the independence wars in Cuba, although it saw limited battlefield use. Carlos Manuel de Céspedes, owner of the sugar refinery La Demajagua near Manzanillo, freed his slaves on 10 October 1868. He proceeded to lead them, armed with machetes, in revolt against the Spanish government. The first cavalry charge using machetes as the primary weapon was carried out on 4 November 1868 by Máximo Gómez, a sergeant born in the Dominican Republic, who later became the general in chief of the Cuban Army.

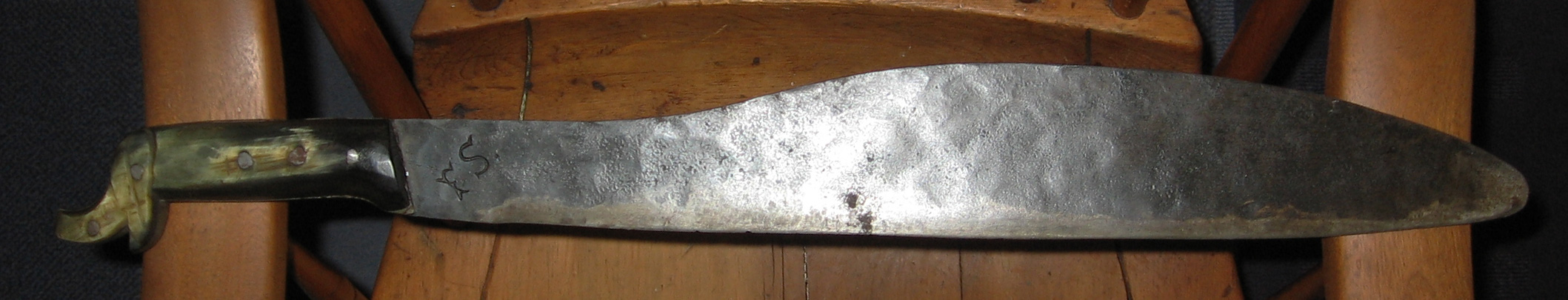
Mexican machete, from Guerrero, 1970. bull horn handle, hand forged blade (hammer marks visible)

The machete is a common side arm and tool for many ethnic groups in West Africa. Machetes in this role are referenced in Chinua Achebe's Things Fall Apart.

Some countries have a name for the blow of a machete; the Spanish machetazo is sometimes used in English. In the British Virgin Islands, Grenada, Jamaica, Saint Kitts and Nevis, Barbados, Saint Lucia, and Trinidad and Tobago, the word planass means to hit someone with the flat of the blade of a machete or cutlass. To strike with the sharpened edge is to "chop". Throughout the English-speaking islands of the Caribbean, the term "cutlass" refers to a laborers' cutting tool.

The Brazilian Army's Instruction Center on Jungle Warfare developed a machete-style knife with a blade 25 cm (10 in) in length and a very pronounced clip point. This machete is issued with a 13 cm (5 in) Bowie knife and a sharpening stone in the scabbard, collectively called a "jungle kit" (Conjunto de Selva in Portuguese); it is manufactured by Indústria de Material Bélico do Brasil (IMBEL).

The machete was used as a weapon during the Mau Mau rebellion, and in South Africa, particularly in the 1980s and early 1990s when the former province of Natal was wracked by conflict between the African National Congress and the Zulu-nationalist Inkatha Freedom Party.

== Manufacture ==
Good machetes rely on the materials used and the shape. In the past, the most famous manufacturer of machetes in Latin America and the Spanish-speaking Caribbean was Collins Company of Collinsville, Connecticut. The company was founded as Collins & Company in 1826 by Samuel W. Collins to make axes. Its first machetes were sold in 1845 and became so famous that a machete was called un collin. In the English-speaking Caribbean, Robert Mole & Sons of Birmingham, England, was long considered the manufacturer of agricultural cutlasses of the best quality. Some Robert Mole blades survive as souvenirs of travellers to Trinidad, Jamaica, and, less commonly, St. Lucia.

Colombia is the largest exporter of machetes worldwide.

== Cultural influence ==
The Flag of Angola

The flag of Angola features a machete, along with a cog-wheel as communist symbols.

The southern Brazilian state of Rio Grande do Sul has a dance called the dança dos facões (machetes' dance) in which the dancers, who are usually men, bang their machetes against various surfaces while dancing, simulating a battle. Maculelê, an Afro-Brazilian dance and martial art, can also be performed with facões. This practice began in the city of Santo Amaro, Bahia, in the northeastern part of the country.

In the Jalisco region of Mexico, Los Machetes is a popular folk dance. This dance tells the story of cutting down sugar cane during the harvest. Los Machetes was created by Mexican farm workers who spent a great amount of time perfecting the use of the tool, the machete, for harvesting. Traditionally, real machetes are used while performing this dance.

== Similar tools ==
The panga or tapanga is a variant used in East and Southern Africa. This name may be of Swahili etymology; not to be confused with the panga fish. The panga blade broadens on the backside and has a length of 41 to 46 cm (16 to 18 in). The upper inclined portion of the blade may be sharpened.

In the Philippines, the various indigenous swords and knives (known under the general term bolo) are commonly incorrectly described as a type of machete (as "bolo machete"). But bolos are unrelated to the machete. They are pre-colonial and hand-forged (unlike mass-produced machetes), with distinct types that differ by ethnic group. The most obvious difference is the shape of the cutting edge, which is typically curved in bolos and more or less straight in machetes. Bolos are also usually shorter than machetes, at around 25 to 45 cm (9.8 to 17.7 in) long, and are adapted to a wider range of uses.

Other similar tools include the parang and the golok (from Malaysia and Indonesia); however, these tend to have shorter, thicker blades and are more effective on woody vegetation.

The tsakat is a similar tool used in Armenia for clearing land of vegetation.

Other similar tools include:

- Billhook
- Golok
- Kukri
- Seax
- Sorocaban Knife
