= Sorocaban knife =

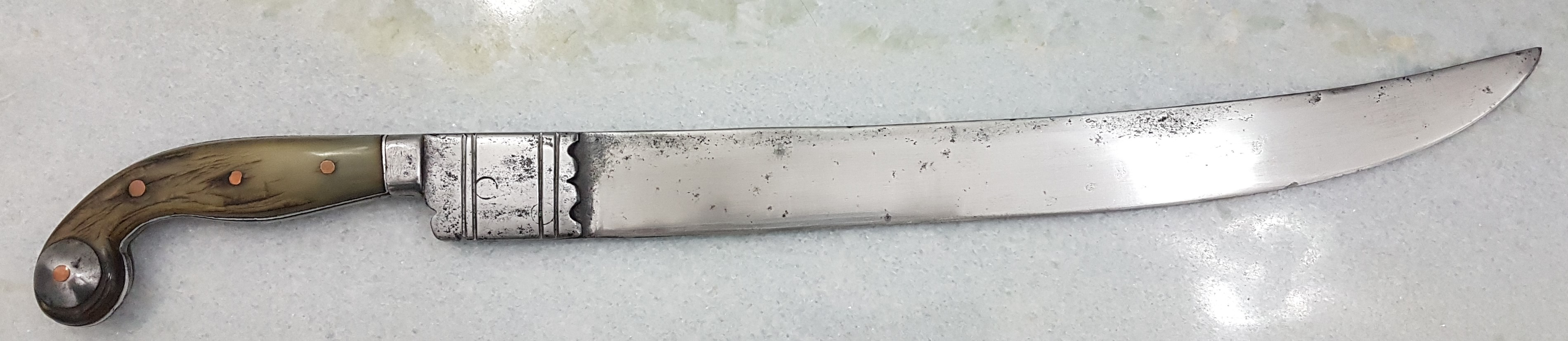
- Sorocaban knife, early 20th century
- Type: Knife or short sword
- Place of origin: São Paulo, Brazil

Service history
- In service: Empire of Brazil, First Brazilian Republic
- Used by: Tropeiros, rural workers, militias, civilian self-defense
- Wars: 19th and 20th century conflicts in Brazil

Production history
- Designed: Late 18th century

Specifications
- Mass: avg. 0.5 kg (1.1 lb)
- Length: avg. 49 cm (19 in), up to 86 cm (34 in)
- Width: avg. 4 cm (1.6 in) at ricasso
- Blade type: Single edged, slightly curved blade
- Hilt type: Simple with rounded pommel

The Sorocaban knife (Portuguese: faca Sorocabana) is a type of knife or short sword developed in Brazil, more precisely the state of São Paulo, around the turn of 18th to the 19th century. Its defining characteristics are the long and slender single-edged blade (frequently curved slightly upwards), the distinctive handle profile, tapering to a rounded pommel, and the enterçado construction technique, in which the blade is inserted into a slit opened in the ricasso and then fixed in place by three rivets.

== Etymology ==
Commonly known today as the Sorocaban knife, it was also known by different names in the past and other regions of Brazil. In the first half of the 20th century, it was known as enterçado machete (facão enterçado) or Sorocaban machete (facão Sorocabano) in other states of Brazil. The different names may preserve clues about its origins and are discussed by enthusiasts and researchers of the weapon. The word enterço could suggest a relationship with a Portuguese infantry sword known as terçado. Another possibility is that enterçado is a corruption of the Portuguese verbs interserir and inserir (meaning "insert") or intercalar (meaning "intercalate"), due to the peculiar construction method in which the blade is inserted between two metal plates that stem from the handle, forming the weapon's ricasso.

== History ==
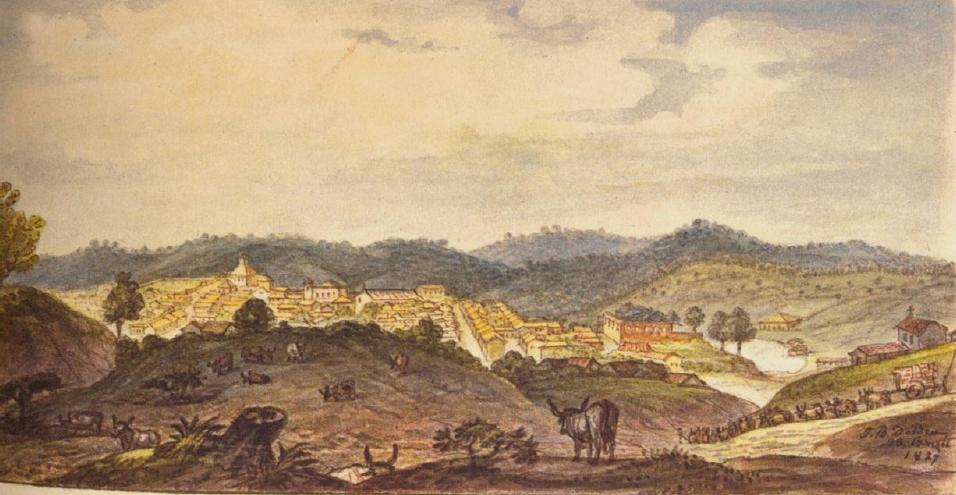
Town of Sorocaba in 1827, painted by Jean-Baptiste Debret.

Of uncertain origins, the Sorocaban knife probably began its development at the end of Brazil's colonial period, achieving its defining characteristics around the 1830s, during the Empire, according to iconographic evidence of the time. The uncommon enterçado construction technique may have been used due to the relative difficulty to obtain or manufacture good blades in Brazil before the 20th century, making it necessary to repurpose broken imported sword blades and adapting them to a new, locally manufactured, handle.

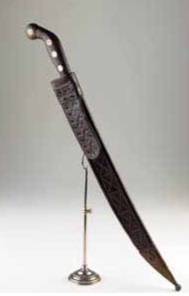
Sorocaban knife belonging to Pedro Nolasco de Oliveira (Pedrão), one of Antônio Conselheiro's chiefs during the War of Canudos.

Even though it was also manufactured in other cities of São Paulo and Paraná, the toponym Sorocabana derives from the fact that the city of Sorocaba used to be an important center of its manufacture and probable place of origin. Since the discovery of iron deposits in Araçoiaba, in 1597, by Afonso Sardinha, the region of Sorocaba attracted rustic small-scale smelters. However, only in 1810, after the transfer of the Portuguese court to Brazil, did King John VI of Portugal grant permission for large scale industrial exploitation of the ore, allowing for the appearance of many local and foreign cutlers in the city. Also during the 19th century, the centrality of Sorocaba in the network of trading routes established by the tropeiros allowed for its diffusion throughout the southern hinterlands of the country and consolidated the relationship between the city and the knife. A versatile weapon, the Sorocaban knife was widely used in several internal conflicts in Brazil, such as the War of Canudos and Constitutionalist Revolution.

From the end of the 19th century onward, the Sorocaban knife became industrially mass-produced, and most makers began replacing the enterçado construction technique with a full tang structure. In some cases, the blades were imported from Solingen, and received final assembly and finish in Brazil, such as the knives made by Domingos de Meo. The knife also became very common in São Paulo's rural areas, being used not only as a self-defense weapon but also as tool for daily use. In modern times, they have been mostly replaced by other implements and weapons, but antiques and premium handmade knives are highly sought after by collectors for their historical, aesthetic and cultural value.

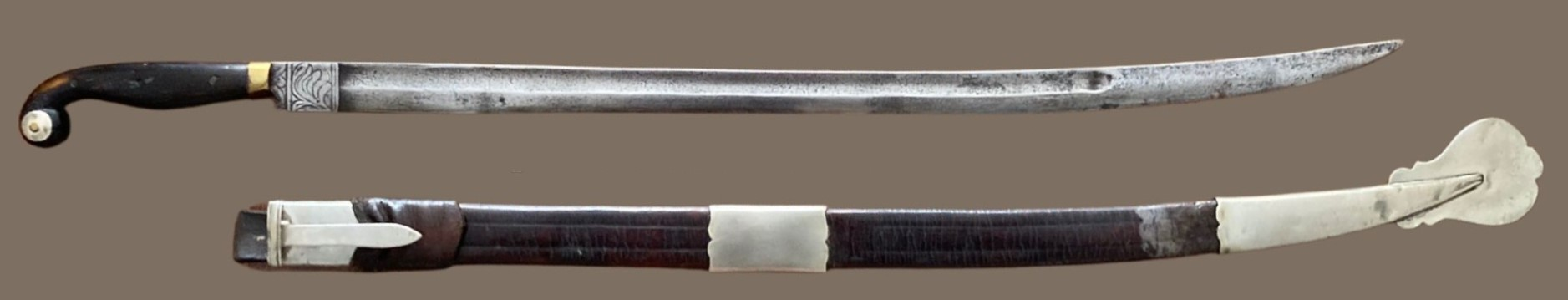
Sorocaban sword, late 19th century. Total length: 71 cm unsheathed and 78 cm sheathed.

== Characteristics ==
=== Handle ===
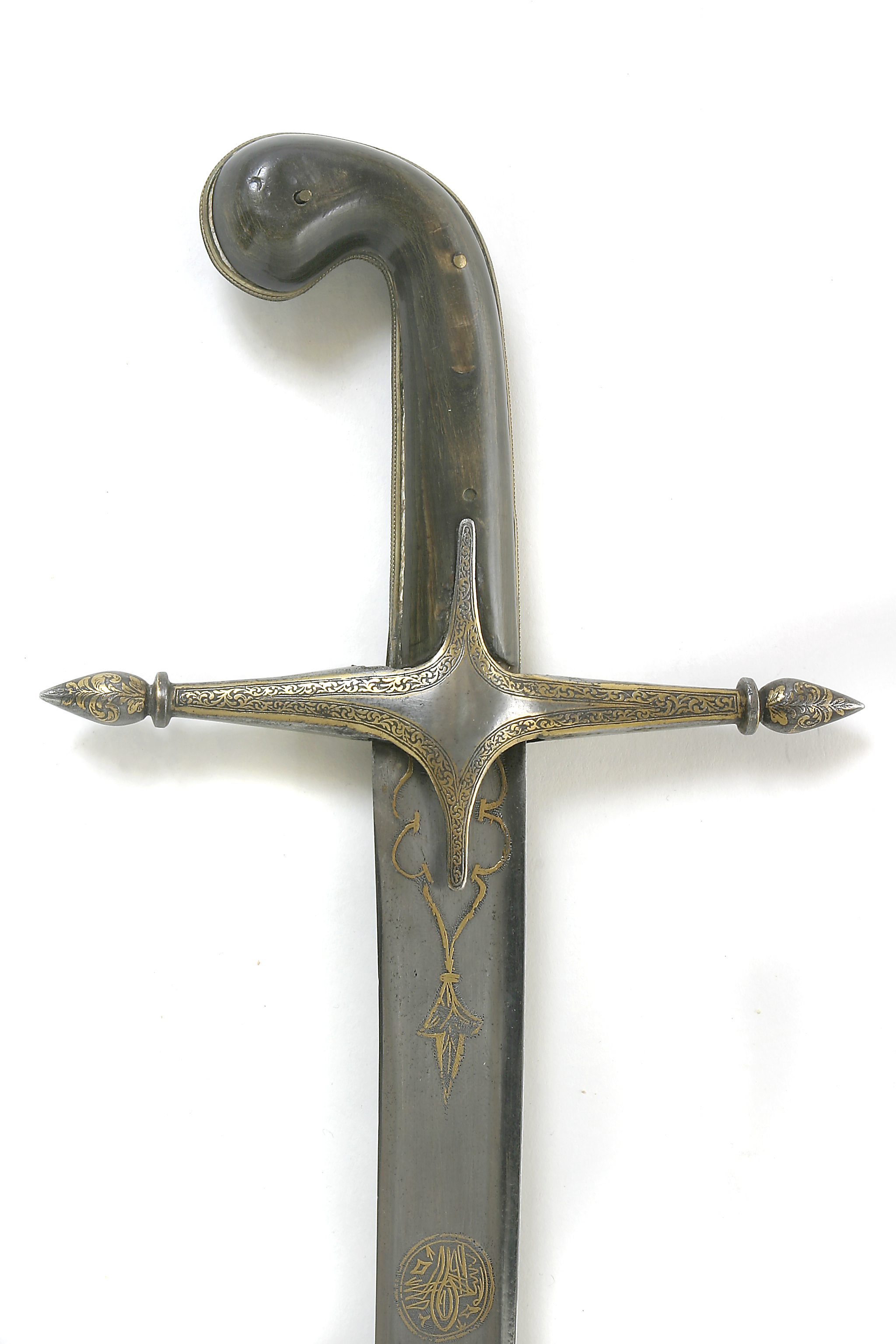
The handle of a Turkish kilij shares many similarities to the Sorocaban's. It lacks, however, the latter's distinctive bulge.

The most distinctive aspect of a Sorocaba knife is its handle design. Usually made of bull horn, the handle ends in a rounded pommel frequently decorated with a metal disc, alternatively known as a fish-eye (olho de peixe) or cat-eye (olho de gato). The handle profile shows some similarity to Middle-Eastern weapons, especially the Turkish kilij, though these display a cylindrical or conical profile, while the Sorocaban's handle always exhibits a slight bulge near the middle point that gently tapers towards the pommel. Some 19th century samples present simple S or D guards to protect the user's hand. The ergonomic shape of the handle allows for a tight grip while keeping the hand from sliding over the blade.

=== Blade ===
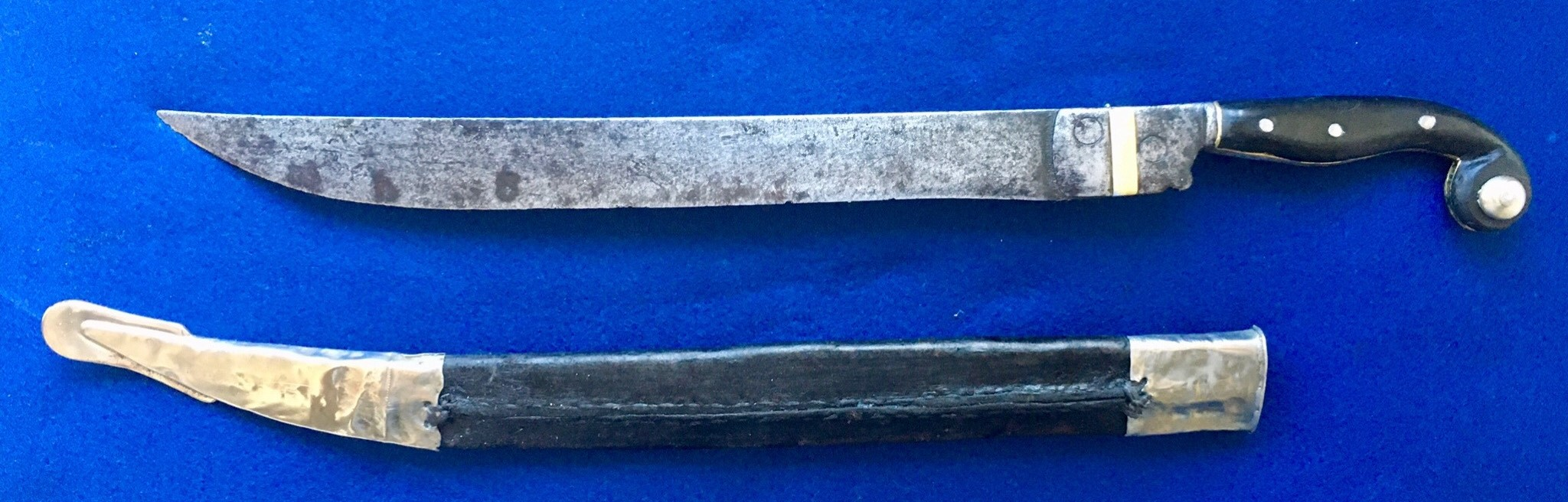
Sorocaban knife from the latter half of the 19th century with straight blade and brass decoration around the ricasso. The sheath follows decorative conventions of the time, with a guitar-shaped metal tip.

The blade is generally single-edged, long, thin and slender. The shape favours slashing and cutting, with some, albeit limited, capacity for stabbing. There is considerable variation in length and shape. Blades differ in size, but are usually between 8 and 16 in (200 and 410 mm) long, with some rarer examples reaching the size of swords of up to 36 in (910 mm). The spine seldom exceeds thicknesses of 0.125 in (3.2 mm) and is often slightly curved upwards near the tip, much like a sabre, while straight blades, with some exceptions, are more frequently found among industrially made knives. Some rare blades, usually made in the 20th century, exhibit a clip point, like the Bowie knife.

=== Enterço ===
The enterço is an atypical construction technique for knives. It consists of inserting a blade (repurposed or manufactured separately) to a slit cut in the ricasso and merging both parts with rivets. A V-shaped slit was cut into the ricasso to accommodate the handle and the blade. Then, with both parts mated and aligned, three holes were drilled through the ricasso and the rivets were forge-welded to the knife, strongly securing both blade and handle to one another. The ricasso was often decorated with engravings or bands of silver, brass or nickel-silver wrapped around it. With the advent of industrialization and mass-production, manufacturers began to opt for the easier full tang construction and gradually replaced the enterço method, now mostly used by cutlers who wish to build historically authentic knives.

Enterço construction examples

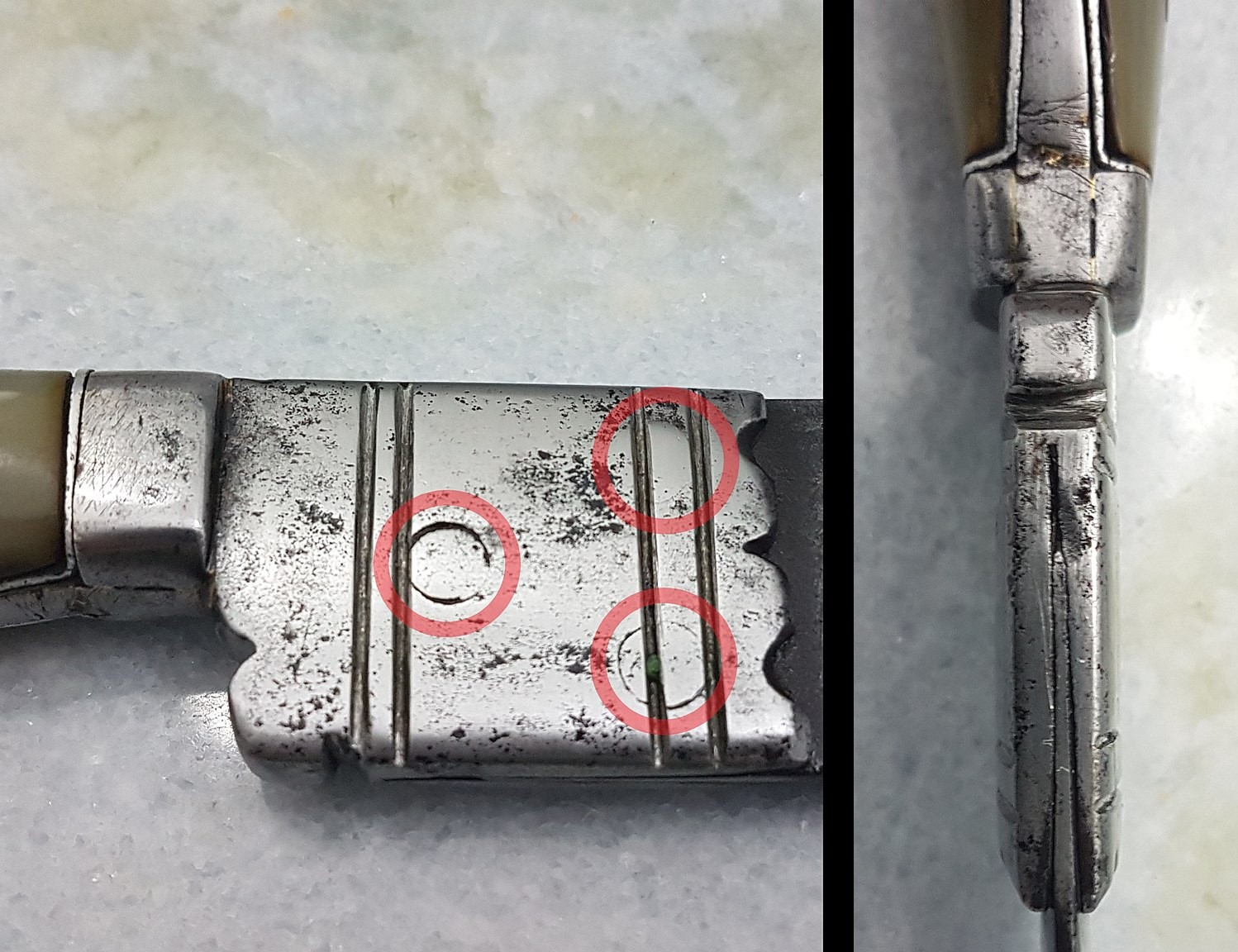
The red circles highlight the faint outline of the three rivets that fix the blade to the knife's ricasso. The picture to the right shows how the blade is inserted into the modestly decorated ricasso.

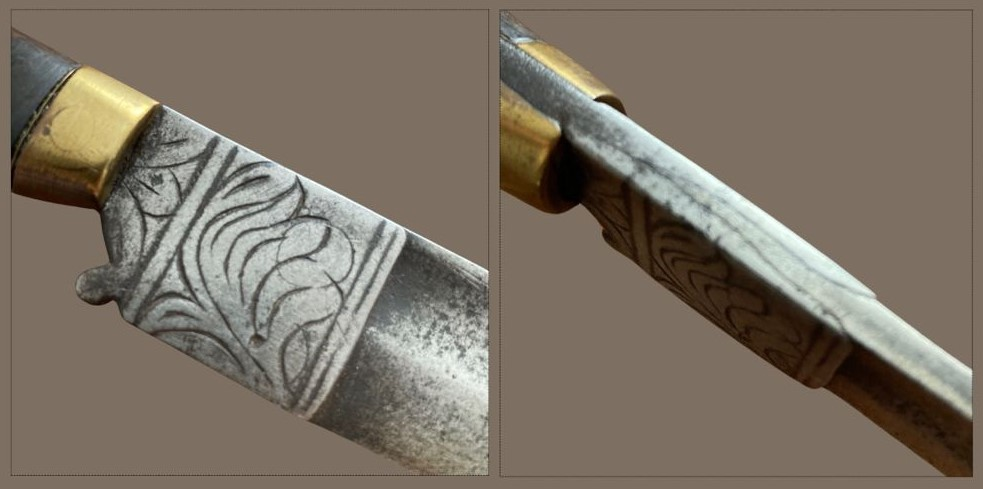
Details of a Sorocaban sword. The enterço construction method was used on small and large blades alike. Visible are the outlines of the rivets, the slit into which the blade is inserted and the more elaborate ricasso decorations.
