= Polyphthalamide =

Semi-crystalline high-temperature plastic in the Nylon family

Repeating unit of polyphthalamide

Polyphthalamide (a.k.a. PPA, High Performance Polyamide) is a subset of thermoplastic synthetic resins in the polyamide (nylon) family defined as when 55% or more moles of the carboxylic acid portion of the repeating unit in the polymer chain is composed of a combination of terephthalic (TPA) and isophthalic (IPA) acids. The substitution of aliphatic diacids by aromatic diacids in the polymer backbone increases the melting point, glass transition temperature, chemical resistance and stiffness.

PPA based resins are molded into parts to replace metals in applications requiring high temperature resistance such as automotive powertrain components, the housing for high temperature electrical connectors and many other uses.

Formulated PPA granules ready for molding

== Structure ==
The diamines in PPAs are aliphatic. PA6T homopolymer melts at 371 °C, which renders it intractable. To make usable polymers, it is necessary to lower the melting point, which can be achieved practically using either a longer diamine (with 9-12 carbon atoms) or by copolymerizing 6I.

Three copolymers have found commercial success: PA 6T/66, PA 6T/"DT" and PA6T/6I (with Isophthalic acid).

Polyphthalamide TPA/hexamethylenediamine (6T) repeat unit

Polyphthalamide TPA/methylpentanediamine (DT) repeat unit

If more than 55% of the acid part of a PPA is made out of IPA, then the copolymer is amorphous. Molar masses for PPAs made with direct polycondensation techniques range between 12,000 and 16,000 g/mol.

== Properties ==
Compared to aliphatic polyamides, PPAs offer improved

- chemical resistance
- higher strength and stiffness at elevated temperatures
- creep and fatigue resistance
- warpage
- dimensional stability
- sensitivity to moisture absorption

The glass transition temperature of PPA increases as the amount of TPA increases. If more than 55% of the acid part of a PPA is made out of IPA, then the copolymer is amorphous. The properties of semicrystalline polymers v amorphous polymers are described elsewhere in detail. Briefly, crystallinity helps with chemical resistance and mechanical properties above the glass transition temperature (but below the melting point). Amorphous polymers are good in warpage and transparency.

Like aliphatic nylons, PPAs can be (in fact are almost invariably) modified with reinforcing agents such as glass fibers, tougheners and/or stabilizers.

Formulations with specific properties have been developed. For example, resins with ability to bond directly to elastomers to give plastic-rubber composites, and with approval for direct contact with drinking water and food.

=== Polyphthalamide blends ===
The addition of aliphatic polyamides to PPAs (PPA/PA blend) lowers the melting point and glass transition temperature, which potentially makes these polyphthalamide blends easier to process when compared to higher melting/softening PPAs.

While there have been large investigations into PA/polyolefin blends, little has been published about the properties of PPA/ polyolefin blends. This may be due to the relatively high processing temperatures needed for PPA based resins compared to the temperature stability of polyolefins. PPA/PA/polyolefin blends exhibit a good balance of ductility, strength, stiffness, impact, and thermal performance, indicating that these types of materials should have commercial utility.

== Applications ==
Polyphthalamide based resins are injection molded into parts that are used in a wide variety of applications. Automotive uses include fuel and coolant lines, pump wear rings, motor bobbin parts, fuel line connectors, water heater manifolds fuel modules, fuel cut-off valves, thermostat housing, air coolers, coolant pumps, and LED headlights. In electronics, the high melting point of PPA allows surface mount devices parts molded from PPA to be assembled using a lead-free soldering process. PPAs are also used for USB-C connectors, LED mounts and cable/wire protection. Other applications for PPA based resins include gas pipes and supply lines for the oil industry (due to their ability to withstand high pressures), Medical applications such as tubing for catheters, in personal care, for toothbrush bristles as well as hairbrushes. PPAs are also used in sports equipment, valve bodies for showers, bushings and bearing pads in aircraft engines

== Lifecycle impact ==
PPAs, as any thermoplastic, are theoretically fully recyclable by remelting, and as a condensation polymer by depolymerization. Commercial recycling requires the cost of logistics and cleaning and processing to be lower than the cost of virgin polymer, which is not always the case. The PPA waste that produces energy can be recovered at incineration plants. The best recovery options depend on many conditions such as local legislation, plastic part design, access to sorting facilities, and recycling costs.

== Commercial suppliers ==
- Arkema under the brand Rilsan HT polymers based on decanediamine, presumably 10T/X.
- BASF under the brand Ultramid Advanced N (PA9T), Ultramid Advanced T1000 (PA6T/6I), Ultramid Advanced T2000 (PA6T/66), Ultramid T KR (PA6T/6).
- Celanese (Formerly DuPont) under the brand Zytel HTN with 6T/66 and 6T/MPDMT.
- DSM under the brand ForTii with copolymers of PA 4T.
- EMS under the brand Grivory. GV grades are based on PA66/6I/6T. HT1 grades on 6T/6I, HT2 grades on 6T/66 and HT3/HT3-CO on copolymers of 10T
- Evonik under the brand Vestamid HT 'plus' with 6T/X and 10T/X polymers.
- Kuraray under the brand Genestar with 9T copolymer (used two isomers of C9 diamine).
- Mitsui under the brand Arlen with 6T/66
- Solvay under the brand Amodel. Initially commercialized by Amoco, today this brand is owned by Solvay. According to Nevicolor, all current Amodel grades are based on a single polymer, A1000 but there are grades based on 66/6T copolymer and others on 66/6T/6I copolymer.
