= Fighting knife =

Knife designed to inflict injury

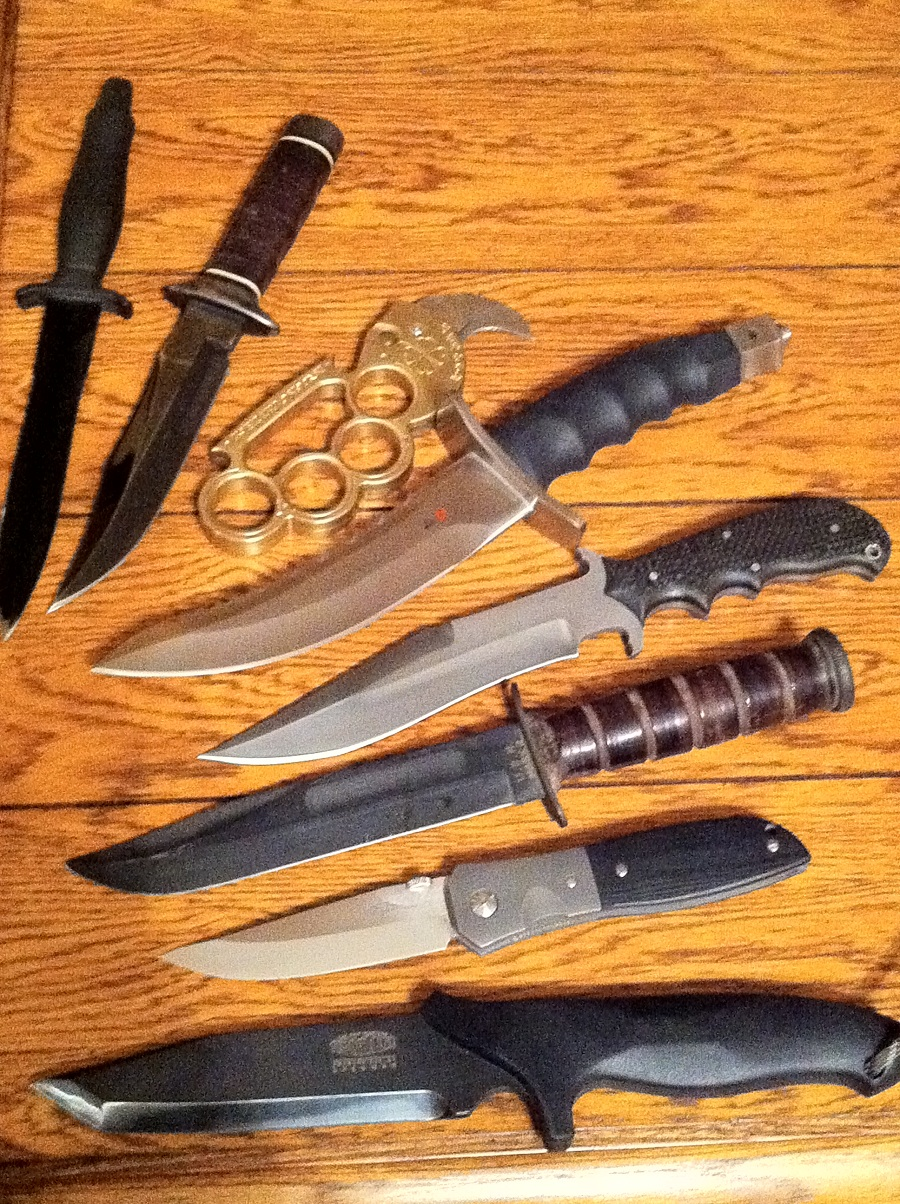
An assortment of fighting knives

A fighting knife has a blade designed to most effectively inflict injury in close-quarters physical confrontations. The combat knife and the trench knife are examples of military fighting knives.

Fighting knives were traditionally designed as special-purpose weapons, intended primarily if not solely for use in personal or hand-to-hand combat. This singleness of purpose originally distinguished the fighting knife from the field knife, fighting utility knife, or in modern usage, the tactical knife. The tactical knife is a knife with one or more military features designed for use in extreme situations, which may or may not include a design capability as a fighting or combat weapon. Since World War I, the fighting knife in military service has gradually evolved into a dual-purpose or "fighting-utility" knife, suited for both knife fighting and utility roles. As a consequence, the terms "fighting knife" and "tactical knife" are frequently employed interchangeably.

== History ==
=== Ancient history ===
Utility knives with stone or flint blades have been used in personal combat since Paleolithic times. One of the earliest metal-blade fighting knives was the dagger. The first early Bronze Age daggers featured Beaker copper blades, likely made with stone tools. In 1984, a Beaker period (ca. 2500 – 2000 BC) copper dagger blade was recovered from the Sillees River near Ross Lough, County Fermanagh, Northern Ireland that had a remarkably modern appearance. The flat, triangular-shaped copper blade was 171 mm (6.75 inches) long, 42.5 mm (1.65 inches) wide, and 2mm (0.078 inches) in maximum thickness, with bevelled edges and a pointed tip, and featured an integral tang that accepted a riveted handle. Analysis of the copper used in the dagger's construction revealed it to be of a type characteristic of the copper that was widely used in Ireland before the introduction of bronze tools and weapons. By around 2000 BC daggers were being cast of bronze, with blades formed by drawing and hammering the metal on bronze anvils set in guides.

=== Post-classical history ===
An early iron-bladed knife that served a dual purpose as fighting knife and utility blade was the seax, a pattern-welded weapon which dates from the 5th century AD, and worn as standard armament by Anglo-Saxon warriors from northern Italy as far north as Scandinavia and as far west as Ireland. The seax of the 5th and 6th century was shorter and narrower than those introduced later on, and could be described as either a large dagger or a short sword. As swords created from pattern-welded iron were enormously expensive weapons at the time, the early seax filled a need for an affordable blade that could be used as both a fighting knife and a utility knife.

With the development of steel and simplified forging techniques, the sword became the preferred bladed weapon for most professional fighting men. During the latter part of the 12th century, the steel-blade dagger became popular as a secondary weapon for knights as a standard part of their equipment. This new form of dagger was really a miniaturized sword, featuring a flat double-edged blade and central spine or fuller.

The first fighting daggers to become widely popular in Europe were the rondel dagger and the bollock dagger. The rondel dagger was a fighting knife with a double-edged, tapered blade and a hilt featuring circular guards. The bollock dagger dates from around 1300–1350, and had a distinctive hilt cap formed from two lobes that acted as a hand-stop. It was especially popular with English and Norwegian combatants. French and Italian daggers of the 14th century were the first to introduce acutely tapered blades and reinforced points in response to improvements made in armor design and the need for penetration.

=== Modern history ===
==== Early modern ====
In the Near East, fighting knives such as the pesh-kabz were developed originally to defeat enemy personnel wearing leather armour. The pesh-kabz dates from the 17th century and is of Central Asian and Persian origin, but was later adopted by the Mughals, who brought the knife with them on their campaigns to conquer India. It was subsequently adopted throughout Afghanistan, northern India, and what is now Pakistan.

As the importance of the dagger declined in military service, the weapon became extremely popular in civilian society as an item of daily wear, being used for everything from personal defense to dinner cutlery. In Andalucian Spain the personal fighting knife was epitomized by the famous ratcheting folding knife known generally as the navaja. The navaja was originally used primarily by the barateros of the underworld and the working class, but by the 1800s it had become an accepted personal weapon for Spanish men of all backgrounds, including the wealthy.

In Portugal, the faca, a large fixed-blade fighting and utility knife accompanied Portuguese explorers and settlers during their conquest of Brazil, where the pattern remains popular to this day. From the faca is derived the facón, the large fighting-utility knife of the gaucho. The facón is widely used in Argentina, Brazil, and Uruguay in an indigenous style of knife fighting inspired by Andalusian knife fighting techniques known as esgrima criolla ("Creole fencing").

==== Late modern ====
===== 19th century =====
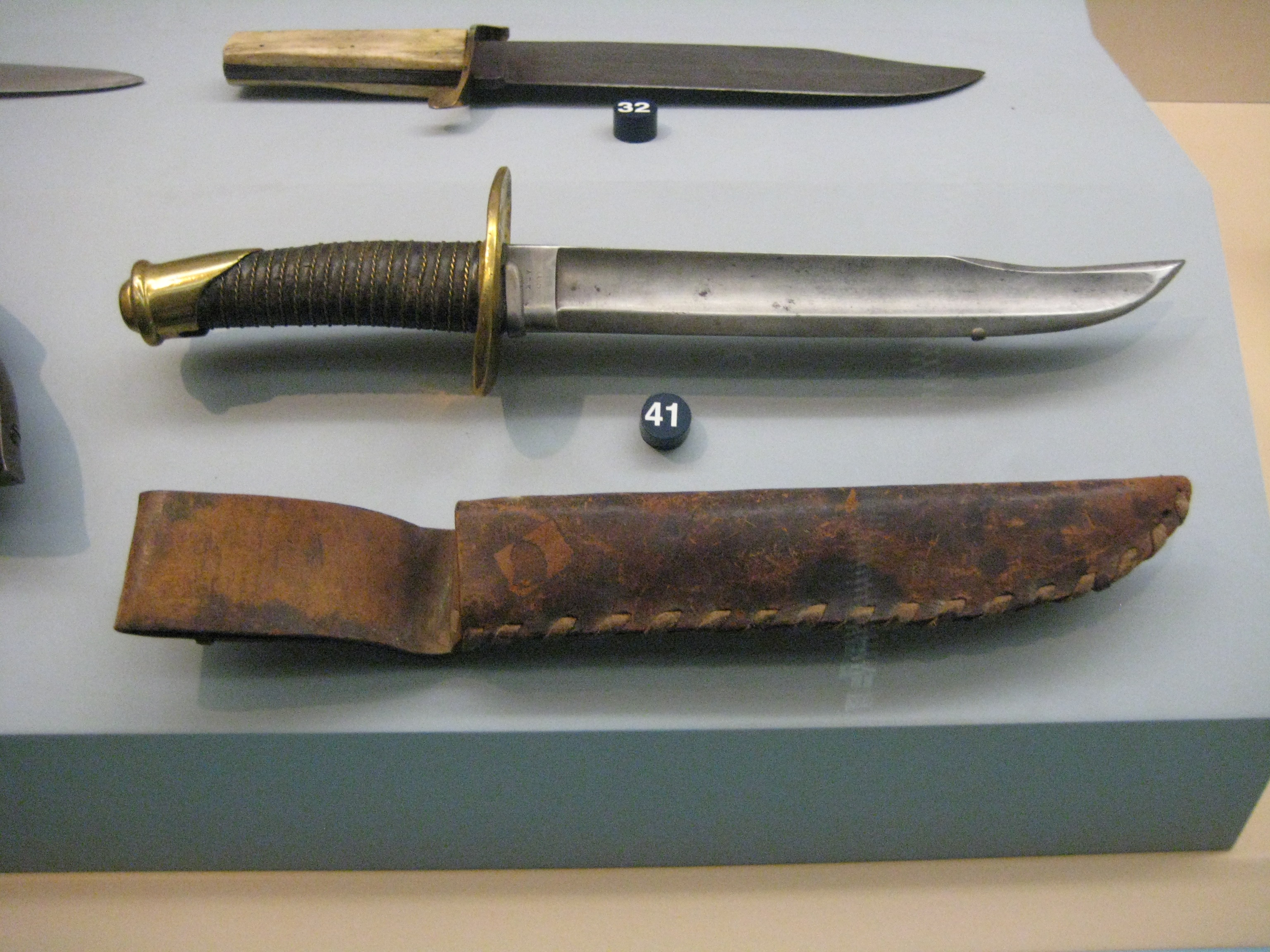
Top: Bowie Knife c. 1850s Bottom: Naval Bowie Knife c. 1860s

In North America, the advantages of a large fighting knife were seized upon by American frontiersmen, who faced both animal and human opponents of considerable ferocity. This popularity spiked in 1827 with the introduction of Bowie Knife, a pattern inspired by the knives commissioned by Rezin Bowie, brother of the better known James "Jim" Bowie. James became famous after killing one Norris Wright in a bloody melee at the Vidalia Sandbar Fight, but brother Rezin was the knife lover in the family. After the Bowie knife pattern was standardized during the 1830s and 1840s, it proved to be an enormously popular design, so much so that during the mid-19th century it became synonymous with the term "fighting knife". The fighting Bowies of 1830–1860 usually had 10 to 12 inch blades; some were even larger. The Bowie knife largely replaced earlier Native American tools and weapons such as the tomahawk. Before the introduction of reliable and powerful cap-and-ball revolvers on the American frontier, the Bowie knife was often preferred to a single-shot handgun or "horse pistol". During the later years of the 19th century, the classic Bowie knife pattern would be gradually reduced in size and length as its role changed from that of a dedicated fighting knife and weapon to a general-purpose knife and tool that could be used as a fighting knife in an emergency.

===== 20th century =====
By 1900, civilian fighting knives were being mass-produced in a countless variety of shapes and sizes, though they all shared the common characteristic of being primarily designed for use in physical combat. However, in military service, the traditional fighting knife began a gradual transition from a "pure" design intended solely for fighting to a knife that could fulfill other roles as well. This trend was not unprecedented, as many nations and cultures had already adopted various multi-purpose fighting knife patterns derived from popular general-purpose knives with cultural and historic roots, beginning with the Anglo Saxon seax of medieval times. Thus Chilean soldiers, for instance, were trained in the use of the Corvo, a traditional Chilean military weapon, while Gurkha regiments of the Indian Army serving the British Empire favored the Kukri, a broad-bladed, curved general-purpose cutting tool and weapon with Indian origins. In other countries the machete or Filipino Bolo were often used as fighting knives by indigenous military or paramilitary forces. Colonial powers that encountered these general-purpose weapons used as fighting knives during a military campaign occasionally adopted them in turn for use by their own military forces, as exemplified by the U.S. Army's Model 1910/17 "Bolo" brush-clearing knife, which would be later pressed into service as a fighting knife in both World Wars.

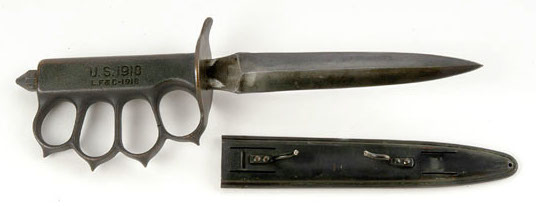
M1918 Trench Knife

In World War I, military use of the fighting knife saw the introduction of the "trench knife", a fighting knife designed solely for military use in the trench warfare of that conflict. On the Allied side, these "knives" were originally little more than sharpened spikes or cut-down bayonets fitted with handles. As the war progressed, French, British and U.S. ordnance branches began introducing fighting knives based on standardized patterns, such as the U.S. Mark I trench knife. In Western Europe, one dual-purpose fighting knife to be widely adopted by German forces during World War I was the Nahkampfmesser (Close Combat Knife), which despite its name was actually a general-purpose combat and field knife. The Nahkampfmesser was extremely popular in German military service, and would be issued again in slightly revised form during World War II as the Kampfmesser 42.

====== World War II ======
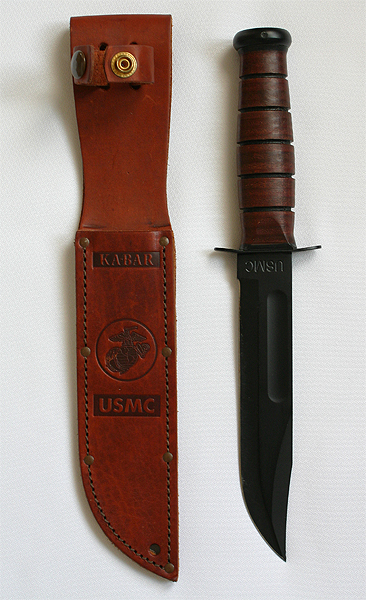
U.S. Marine KA-BAR Knife

In the Pacific theater of World War II, U.S. Army and Marine Corps personnel frequently employed jungle and utility knives such as machetes, bush knives, hospital corps knives, and bolos as fighting knives. These knives were particularly favored by elite or specialist units such as the U.S. Army's Bushmaster regiment and Pioneer combat engineer detachment and the Marine Raider and Paramarine battalions of the U.S. Marine Corps. The success of these large knives in individual combat engagements caused authorities to reexamine the suitability of existing "commando"-type fighting knives for troops expected to fight the Japanese.

In late 1942, the U.S. Marine Corps adopted the 1219C2, later designated the USMC Mark 2 Combat Knife or Knife, Fighting Utility, but better known in popular terminology as the KA-BAR. The KA-BAR differed from World War I-era U.S. fighting knives in that it was purposely designed as a dual-purpose weapon, adapted for both combat and as a utility knife. It also differed from some earlier USMC knives such as the Marine Raider stiletto in that the new knife used a stout, wide blade with clip point that facilitated slashing attacks as well as blade thrusts. Subsequent reports on the effectiveness of the new knife in jungle combat substantiated the Marine Corps decision to standardize the KA-BAR as the USMC's fighting knife for individual Marines.

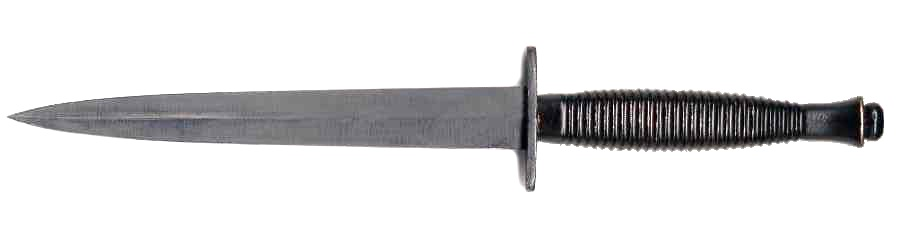
Fairbairn–Sykes fighting knife

In contrast, in 1941 Great Britain introduced one of the most famous "pure" fighting knives designed specifically for military use in combat, the British Fairbairn–Sykes fighting knife (F-S). A traditional single-purpose fighting knife, with an acutely pointed, stiletto-type blade designed to emphasize thrusting strokes (puncture wounds), the F-S was based on the concepts and ideas of William E. Fairbairn and Eric A. Sykes, two renowned former members of the Shanghai Municipal Police who trained countless soldiers in the art of close-quarters fighting. The Fairbairn–Sykes knife inspired several similar knives of the era such as the V-42 stiletto designed by Lt. Colonel Robert T. Frederick, who commanded the joint US and Canadian First Special Service Force and the Marine Raider stiletto designed by Lieutenant Colonel Clifford H. Shuey. Capt. Fairbairn would later introduce a much larger fighting knife, the Smatchet, based on the traditional Welsh Fusiliers trench knife of World War I.

The U.S. Army adopted the M3 Fighting Knife in 1943 as its standard fighting knife. The M3 replaced the earlier World War I-vintage Mark I trench knife in combat service. The M3 was primarily designed as a purist fighting knife, though some compromises were made in the design to conserve strategic materials. When adapted to utility tasks such as opening ration tins or ammunition boxes, the limitations of the M3 pattern quickly became apparent.

In the United States, Knifemaker Bo Randall began production of the "All Purpose Fighting Knife" giving it the designation of "Number 1" in his catalog. Between 1942 and 1945, Randall Made Knives produced 4,000 of these knives for battlefield use by US troops, with approximately 1,058 knives additionally subcontracted to another firm to meet wartime demand. In the 1950s Randall would adopt the general pattern of the Bowie knife for several of his fighting knife designs.

====== Post-WWII to present ======
Designed for military use, Bo Randall's No. 14 "Attack" Model was a popular fighting knife used after World War II. During Vietnam, Randall received feedback from Captain George Ingraham, a Combat Surgeon in the US Army's 94th Medical Detachment. Ingraham's request was for serrations on the spine to cut through the fuselage of downed aircraft to rescue trapped personnel and a hollow handle to allow storage of survival gear. Randall made the changes and the result was the first of the modern survival knives.

During the Vietnam War, the Gerber Mark II, designed by US Army Captain Bud Holzman and Al Mar, was a popular fighting knife pattern that was privately purchased by many U.S. soldiers and marines serving in that conflict.

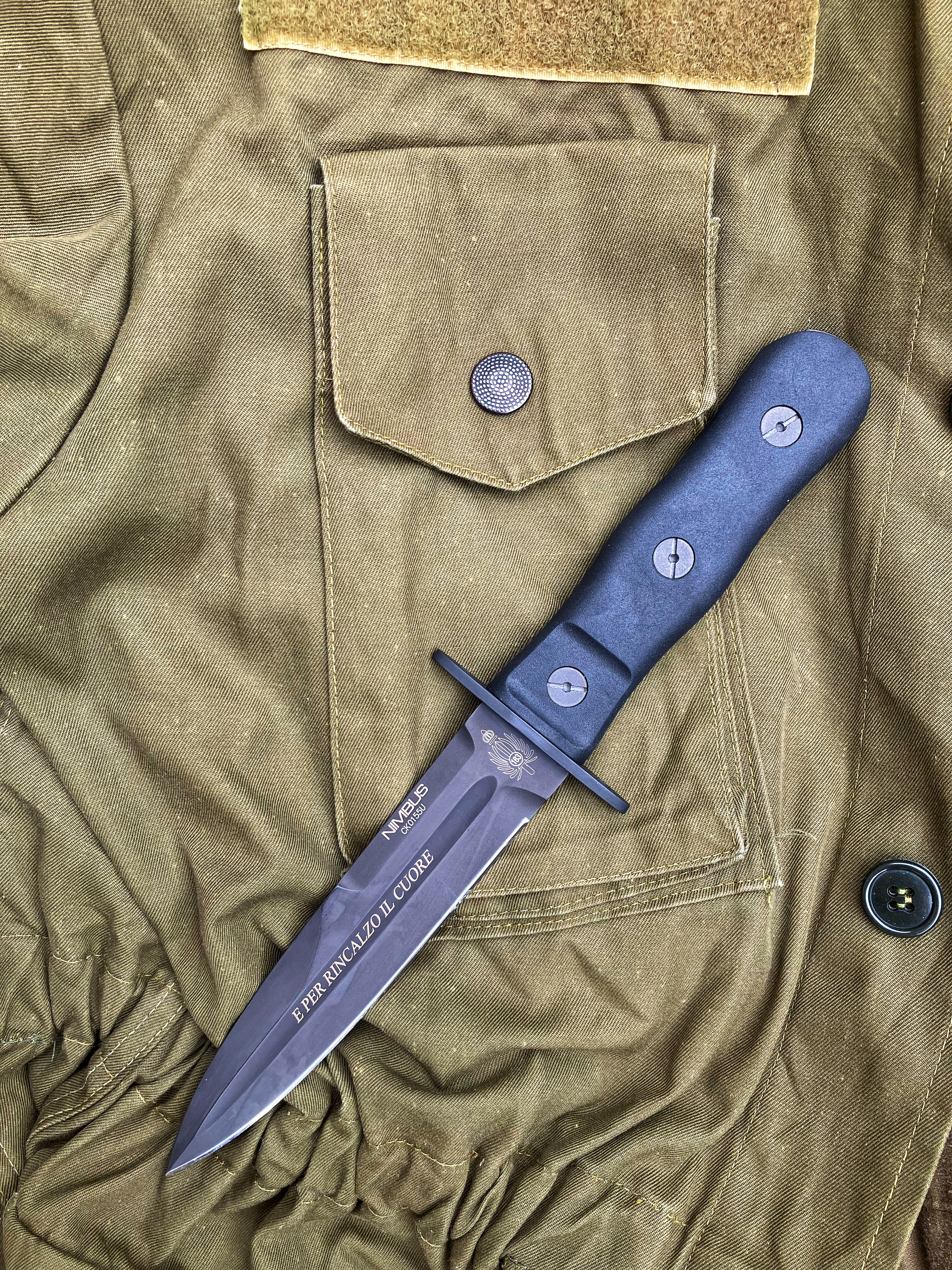
Italian Army combat knife Extrema Ratio NIMBUS Ordinanza.

In the 1970s and 1980s a student and protege of Fairbairn, Colonel Rex Applegate worked with knife designer Bill Harsey, Jr. to design the Applegate-Fairbairn Combat Knife, so named because it was designed as an improvement on the Fairbairn–Sykes based upon discussions Applegate and Fairbairn had during World War II to eliminate the weaknesses of the F-S knife (e.g., weak blade point, inability to determine orientation of blade merely by grip). While the Applegate-Fairbairn combat knife had a blade design that was more versatile than the F-S fighting knife, the former remained primarily a single-purpose fighting knife design. The first of these knives were made by Al Mar Knives, based on Harsey's designs.

== Tactical knife ==
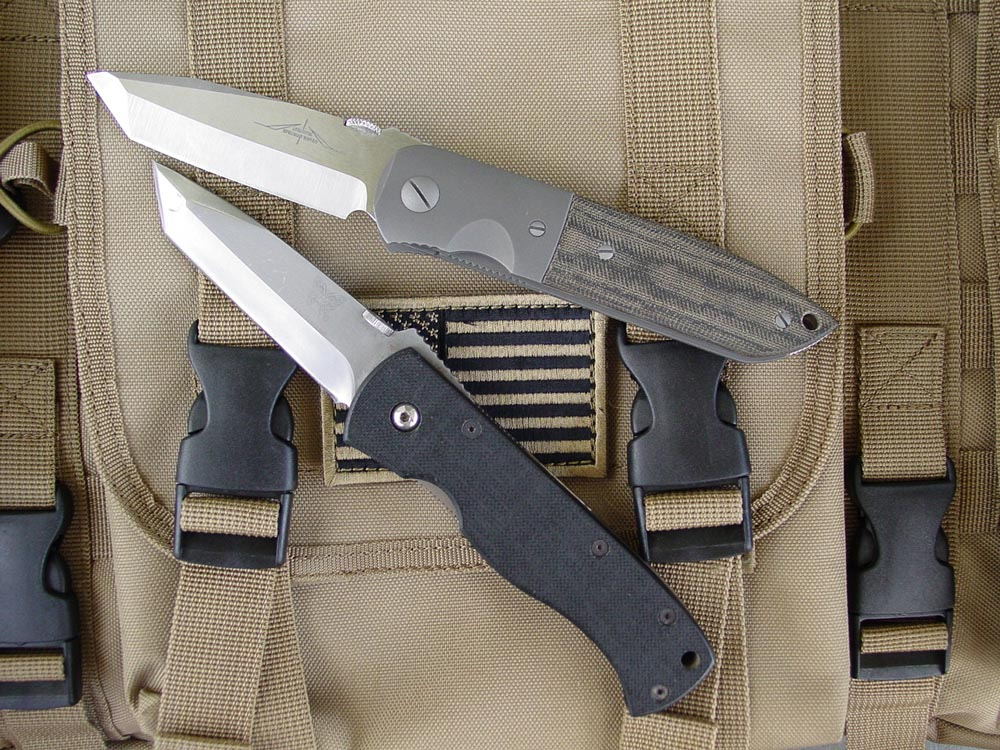
Emerson's custom CQC6 alongside Benchmade's 970 (CQC7)

A tactical knife is a knife with one or more military (martial) features designed for use in extreme situations. In popular usage the terms "fighting knife" and "tactical knife" are frequently employed interchangeably, although a tactical knife is principally designed to be used as a utility tool, not as a weapon.

Folding knives are rarely if ever designed primarily for use as fighting knives or combat knives. However, many armies and military organizations have issued folding "utility" knives that were not intended to be used as weapons, but which had tactical features that appealed to military personnel as well as civilians. This includes the German Mercator "Black Cat" folding utility knife, the German Luftwaffe Fallschirmjäger-Messer, the British Ibberson World War II gravity knife, and the U.S. World War II M2 automatic pressbutton utility knife, also intended for use by parachute troops and flight crews.

Many civilian folding knives also have been privately purchased by both civilians and military personnel for use as general-purpose utility knives. Among these is Buck Knives' Model 110 Folding Hunter, a lockback folding knife. Originally marketed as a hunting knife, the Model 110 saw use with military and naval personnel as a utility or emergency knife for cutting rope, strapping, harnesses, rigging, and a variety of other tasks. Custom knife makers began making similar knives intended for private purchase use by both civilians and military personnel. The earliest production company to make a tactical knife was Al Mar Knives with their SERE model designed for the military with input from Special Forces Colonel James N. Rowe in 1979.

By the 1990s, tactical folding knife sales had risen sharply, and new designs were being regularly introduced at many large gun and knife shows. The trend began with custom knifemakers such as Bob Terzuola, Michael Walker, Mel Pardue, Ernest Emerson, Ken Onion, Chris Reeve, Warren Thomas and Warren Osbourne. These knives were most commonly built as linerlocks, although McHenry & Williams introduced the Axis lock, which is used by Benchmade Knife Company, under license. Blade lengths varied from 3 inches to as long as 12 inches, but the most typical models never exceeded 4 inches in blade length for legal reasons in most US Jurisdictions. Knifemaker Bob Terzuola is credited with coining the phrase "Tactical Folder".

In response to the demand for these knives, production companies offered mass-produced tactical folding knives Companies such as Benchmade, Kershaw Knives, Buck Knives, Al Mar Knives, Gerber Legendary Blades and Spyderco collaborated with tactical knifemakers; in some cases retaining them as full-time designers. Tactical knifemakers such as Ernest Emerson and Chris Reeve went so far as to open their own mass-production factories with Emerson Knives, Inc. and Chris Reeve Knives.

Critics of the "tactical" folding knife point out that the design is not well suited for individual combat when compared to a purpose-built fixed blade combat knife or fighting knife. The very nature of a folding knife means that it will usually have to be retrieved and its blade deployed during a fight – an impractical maneuver during a fight. Students of knife fighting also point out that any locking mechanism can fail and that a folding knife, regardless of lock strength, can never be as reliable as a fixed-blade combat knife. Lynn Thompson, martial artist and former CEO of Cold Steel pointed out in an article in Black Belt magazine that most tactical folding knives are too short to be of use in a knife fight and that even though he manufactures, sells, and carries a tactical folder, it is not ideal for fighting.

== See also ==
- Bayonet
- Hunting dagger
- Hunting knife
- Knife fight
- Messer
- Rex Applegate
- Survival knife
- Tantō
- Throwing knife
- "Yank" Levy fighting knife
- List of daggers
