= Smatchet =

Short, heavy fighting knife

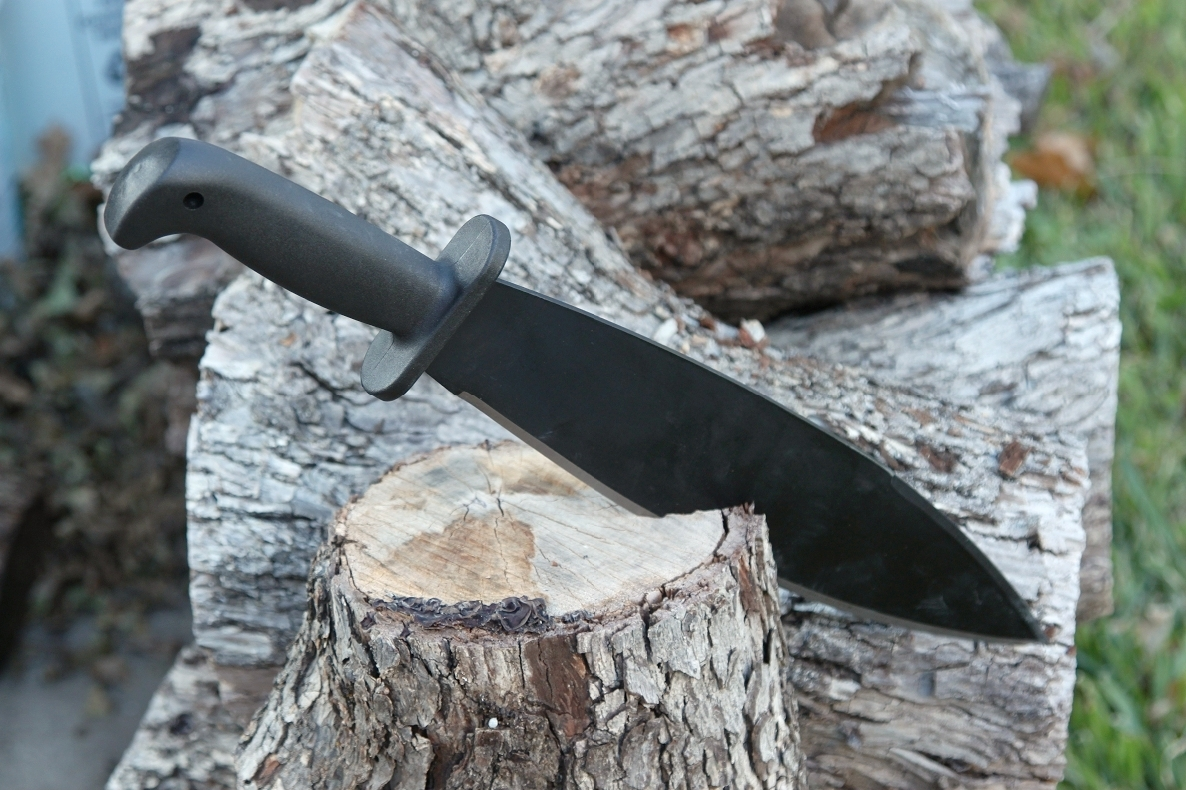
Smatchet lodged in wood

A smatchet is a short, heavy fighting knife 16.5 inches (42 cm) in overall length (including grip). It was designed by William E. Fairbairn during World War II.

== Design ==
Though described in the Office of Strategic Services catalogue as a cross between a machete and a bolo, it was actually based on the Royal Welch Fusiliers Trench Knife of World War I, and was designed as a pure combat knife. It has a broad, leaf-shaped blade sharpened the full length on one side, and from the tip to half of the other side. The entire blade is coated with a dull matte finish to prevent detection at night from stray reflections.

== Use ==
According to Fairbairn, the smatchet was an ideal close-combat weapon for those not armed with a rifle and bayonet:

The psychological reaction of any man, when he first takes the smatchet in his hand, is full justification for its recommendation as a fighting weapon. He will immediately register all the essential qualities of a good soldier – confidence, determination, and aggressiveness. Its balance, weight and killing power, with the point, edge or pommel, combined with the extremely simple training necessary to become efficient in its use, make it the ideal personal weapon for all those not armed with a rifle and bayonet.

The smatchet was used by British and American special forces (Special Air Service and Office of Strategic Services, respectively) during World War II.

In the late 1980s, Rex Applegate licensed a modified version of the smatchet he and Fairbairn designed late in World War II. He called it the "Applegate-Fairbairn Combat Smatchet".

== Manufacturers ==
- Al Mar Knives
- APOC Survival Tools
- Applegate-Fairbairn
- Böker
- Cold Steel
- Sniper Bladeworks
- United Cutlery
- W. R. Case & Sons Cutlery Co.
- Wells Creek Knife & Gun Works
- Windlass Steelcraft

== See also ==
- Applegate–Fairbairn fighting knife
- Barong (sword)
- BC-41
- Corvo
- Eric A. Sykes
- Fairbairn–Sykes fighting knife
- Kukri
- Pattern 1907 bayonet
