= Defendu =

Martial art

- Also known as: Gutter Fighting, Fairbairn's Gutter Fighting, The Fairbairn Fighting System, The Fairbairn system
- Focus: Hybrid
- Country of origin: United Kingdom
- Creator: William E. Fairbairn, Eric A. Sykes
- Famous practitioners: Rex Applegate, Dermot M. "PAT" O'Neill, Devil's Brigade, Ian Fleming, Samuel G. Taxis
- Parenthood: Boxing, judo, Yōshin-ryū jujutsu, savate, wrestling, street fighting, Chinese martial arts
- Olympic sport: No

Close Quarters Combat System (commonly known as Defendu, also called gutter fighting) is a hybrid martial art utilized by British military personnel, notably during the Second World War. It was developed by William E. Fairbairn and Eric A. Sykes in the 1920s.

It is a hand-to-hand combat system based on practical experience mixed with jujutsu and Chinese martial arts that was developed to train the Shanghai Municipal Police, and was later taught in expanded form to Special Operations Executive and Office of Strategic Services members during World War II.

== Development ==
Fairbairn's system was rooted in his training in Jujutsu and Chinese Boxing. He was a second-degree black belt from the Kodokan in Tokyo. He also studied in under Tsai Ching Tung, who had been an instructor to the retainers of the Dowager Empress at the Imperial Palace, Peking. Fairbairn maintained that while these were influences, the system was largely his own invention to differentiate it from traditional sporting styles.

Defendu was developed by William E. Fairbairn, a Royal Marine veteran of the First World War and officer of the Shanghai Municipal Police (SMP), and his fellow SMP officer Eric A. Sykes. Fairbairn had extensive experience in multiple combat sports and martial arts, including boxing, wrestling, savate, Yōshin-ryū jujutsu, judo, and Chinese martial arts. He began to develop his own system of hand to hand combat, initially referring to it as "Defendu", based on his experiences as a police officer. It was designed to be simple to learn and to provide effective results. Fairbairn published his book, Defendu, in 1926 (re-printed as Scientific Self Defence in 1931), illustrating this method and it is here that the term "Defendu" first appeared. This confused early readers of the book, who assumed that the techniques within had been based mainly in the Eastern martial arts that Fairbairn had learned. Thus, in an attempt to highlight the originality of Fairbairn's material, the term did not appear in the 1931 edition of the book. The art was also referred to as "gutter fighting".

Fairbairn was called upon by the British to help train Allied troops in World War II. Fairbairn and others expanded on this system to create the Close Quarters Combat system that was then taught to the troops. This system was built on Defendu, but modified for military applications, rather than police and riot control.

The original Defendu was oriented towards self-defense and restraint, while the Close Quarters Combat system concentrated on rapid disabling of an opponent, with potentially lethal force. The militarized version of Defendu is described in the military manual All in fighting 1942, used as a supplement during WW2 CQB-training. This book was later published in a civilian edition, missing the chapters on bayonet-fighting and rifle sighting, under the name Get Tough! How To Win In Hand-To-Hand Fighting. As Taught To The British Commandos And The U.S. Armed Forces. Fairbairn's CQC-system is also described in Rex Applegate's book Kill or Get Killed.

Fairbairn published several more books on the subject of self-defense, all of which refer to Defendu only in relation to the earlier book.

== Second World War ==
The start of the Second World War saw the Allied forces needing every advantage to give their soldiers and special forces a winning edge. They found one such edge in Fairbairn's system. Immediately, Fairbairn was commissioned in the British Commandos and ordered to teach a lethal version of his system at the Commando school in Scotland.

It was at this top secret Scottish location that Colonel Rex Applegate of the U.S. Army studied under Fairbairn. Through Col. Applegate and other instructors such as Col. Anthony Biddle, these skills were taught to U.S. troops including US Marines and Rangers, as well as OSS operatives and later to the FBI and CIA as the foundation of their basic training.

This introduction of 'The Fairbairn Fighting System' at Camp X in conjunction with input from many highly skilled instructors with various backgrounds and fighting skills was the beginning of the evolution of Defendu. As close quarters battle or unarmed combat training progressed throughout this period, it was added and refined utilising western fighting principles.

== Basic principles ==
Defendu encourages its practitioner to end a confrontation as quickly as possible using "rude" means by rapidly attacking vital spot area (such as the groin, throat, side of the neck, shin, eyes, ears, etc.) by using only several pragmatic and powerful strikes. These strikes are taught as a method and not as disconnected isolated strikes. Done properly, these strikes will chain together. Defendu was also designed to be able to be mastered in mere days due to the extremely compressed curriculum. Students are also taught to always take initiative, employ artifice, and remain at offense (as no block or parry were found in the system).

== See also ==
- All-In Fighting—Manual
- Fairbairn–Sykes fighting knife
