= Combat knife =

Knife for hand-to-hand military combat

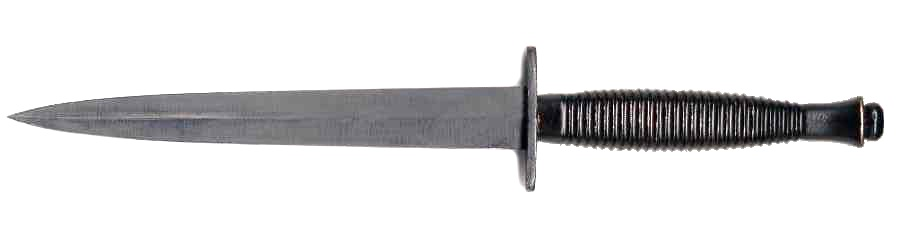
The Fairbairn–Sykes fighting knife, developed for British commandos in World War 2 and used by others post-war.

A combat knife is a fighting knife designed for military use and primarily intended for hand-to-hand or close-combat fighting.

Since the end of trench warfare, most military combat knives have been secondarily designed for utility use (clearing foliage, chopping branches for cover, opening ammunition crates, etc.) in addition to their original role as close-quarter combat weapons, and may be referred to as "fighting-utility knives." On the other hand, military knives that are intended primarily for use in a role other than combat are typically referred to by their primary role, such as "utility knife" or "survival knife".

== History ==
Daggers designed for military usage in close combat engagements have been carried by soldiers for thousands of years. The adoption of combat daggers made of iron was a significant milestone in combat knife development, and such weapons were highly prized in the ancient armies of the Middle East. French and Italian military daggers of the 14th century were the first to introduce the acutely tapered, sharply pointed and double-edged blade as a response to improvements made in armor design and the need to exploit weaknesses in armor protection. The English and Scandinavians introduced a combat knife known as the "bollock dagger" into military service around 1350, while the French poignard and the Scottish dirk were daggers designed from the outset as military weapons.

The rise in use of firearms led to a decline in the use of combat daggers and knives as military-issue weapons. However, privately purchased knives were often carried by foot soldiers for use both as auxiliary weapons and as utility tools. Some military forces issued knives for individual campaigns or for specialist troops such as pioneer or field engineer detachments, but these cutting tools were not primarily designed for use as combat knives.

== Modern combat knives ==
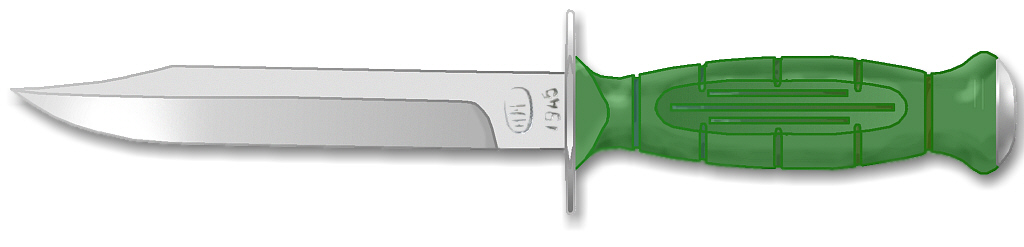
Soviet NR 43 Combat Knife

Formerly known as a trench knife, the "combat knife" was used by both sides on the Western Front during World War I. Since then, combat knives have been issued by the armies of many nations. Though they differ in detail, they all share the common characteristic of being purposely designed for military use, with their primary role as a close-quarters combat weapon.

=== World War II ===
During World War II, the British Fairbairn–Sykes fighting knife was designed by William E. Fairbairn and Eric A. Sykes, two former members of the Shanghai Municipal Police who trained many soldiers in close-quarters fighting. The Fairbairn–Sykes knife inspired several similar knives of the era such as the V-42 stiletto designed by Lt. Colonel Robert T. Frederick, who commanded the joint US and Canadian First Special Service Force, and the United States Marine Raider stiletto designed by Lieutenant Colonel Clifford H. Shuey. In the USSR, the Red Army issued combat knives based on a single pattern known as the NR Series.

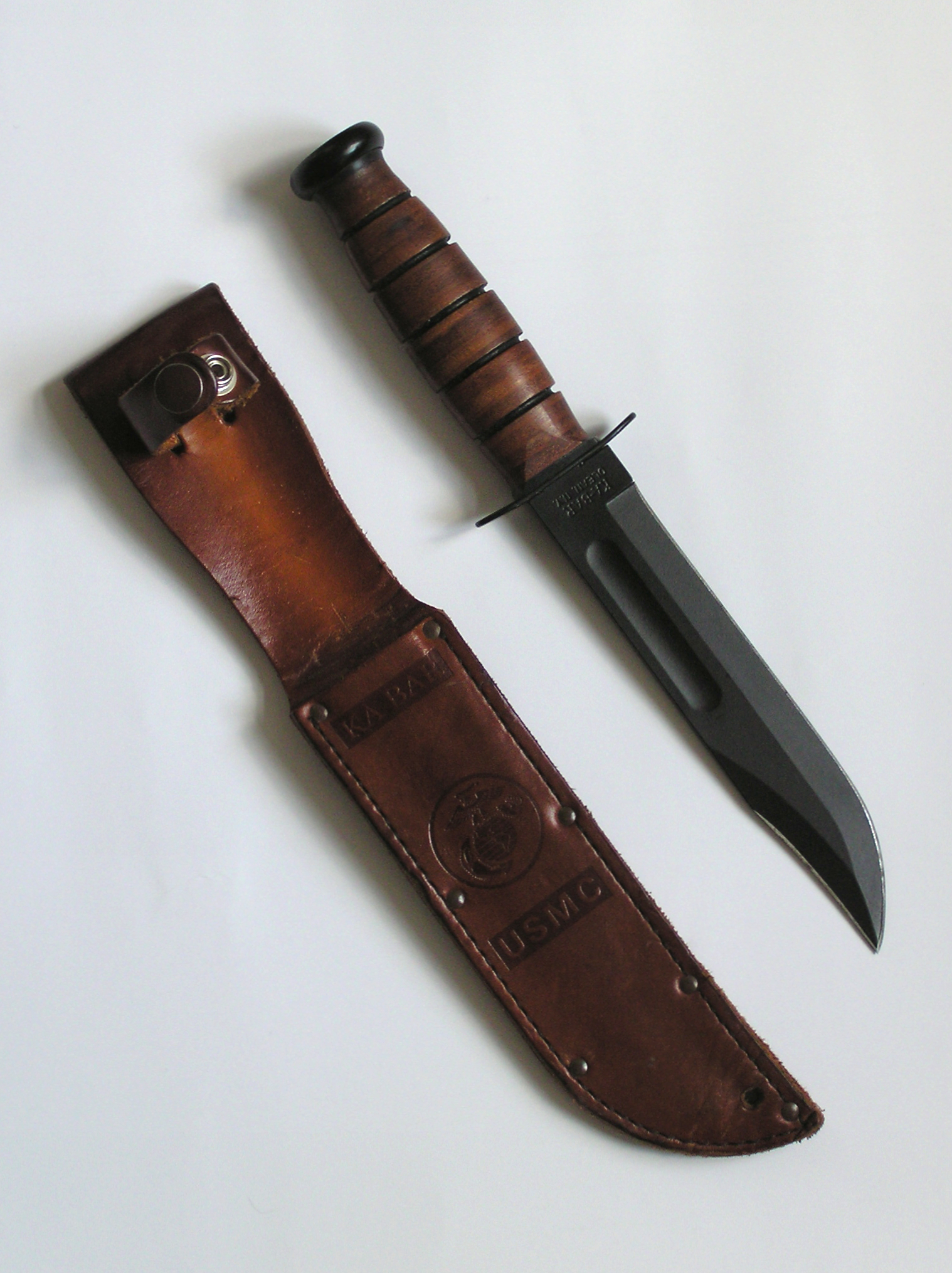
"KA-BAR" USMC Combat Knife, the standard U.S. Marine Corps combat knife during and after World War II

In late 1942, the U.S. Marine Corps adopted the 1219C2, later designated the "USMC Mark 2 Combat Knife," but better known in popular terminology as the KA-BAR. The KA-BAR differed from World War I-era U.S. combat knives in that it was designed as a dual-purpose item, adapted for both combat and as a utility knife. It differed from earlier USMC knives such as the Marine Raider stiletto in that the new knife used a stout, wide blade with clip point that facilitated slashing attacks as well as blade thrusts. Reports on the effectiveness of the new knife in jungle combat justified the Marine Corps' decision to designate the KA-BAR as the USMC's fighting knife for individual Marines.

The U.S. Army adopted the M3 Trench Knife in 1943 as its standard combat knife. The M3 replaced the earlier World War I-vintage Mark I trench knife in combat service. The M3 was a true combat knife, as it was designed solely for military use and was primarily intended as a fighting knife, though some compromises were made in the design to conserve strategic materials. When adapted to utility tasks such as opening ration tins or ammunition boxes, the limitations of the M3 quickly became apparent.

In the United States, Bo Randall began production of the "All Purpose Fighting Knife", giving it the designation of "Number 1" in his catalog. Between 1942 and 1945, Randall Made Knives produced 4,000 of these knives for battlefield use by US troops, with approximately 1,058 knives additionally subcontracted to Northampton Cutlery Company in Springfield, Massachusetts, to meet wartime demand. In the 1950s Randall adopted the general pattern of the Bowie knife for several of his fighting knife designs.

=== Post-World War II ===
The majority of military forces today have largely standardized the types of combat knife issued to soldiers. The Chilean Commando forces, for instance, are trained in the use of the Corvo, a traditional Chilean military weapon. The Gurkha regiments favor the kukri, a broad-bladed, curved general-purpose cutting tool and weapon that more closely resembles a machete or Filipino Bolo than a knife. In the United States Marine Corps, the standard issue combat knife since World War II has been the USMC Fighting Utility knife.

Designed for military use, with input for Capt. George Ingraham, a combat surgeon in the U.S. Army's 94th Medical Detachment, the No. 14 Randall "Attack" Model was a popular combat knife designed for military use, and the knife was widely purchased by individual soldiers and Marines. During the conflict, Randall received feedback from Captain Ingraham, who requested serrations on the spine to cut through the fuselage of downed aircraft to rescue trapped personnel and a hollow handle to allow storage of survival gear. Randall made the changes and the result was the first of the modern survival knives.

Another combat knife appearing during the Vietnam War was the Gerber Mark II, designed for military use by US Army Captain Bud Holzman and Al Mar which in turn was based on the pattern of a Roman Gladius or short sword. In the 1970s and 1980s a student and protégé of Fairbairn, Colonel Rex Applegate worked with knife designer Bill Harsey, Jr. to design the Applegate-Fairbairn Combat Knife, so named because it was designed as an improvement on the Fairbairn–Sykes based upon discussions Applegate and Fairbairn had during World War II to eliminate the weaknesses of the F-S knife (e.g., weak blade point, inability to determine orientation of blade merely by grip). The first of these knives were made by Al Mar Knives, based on Harsey's designs.

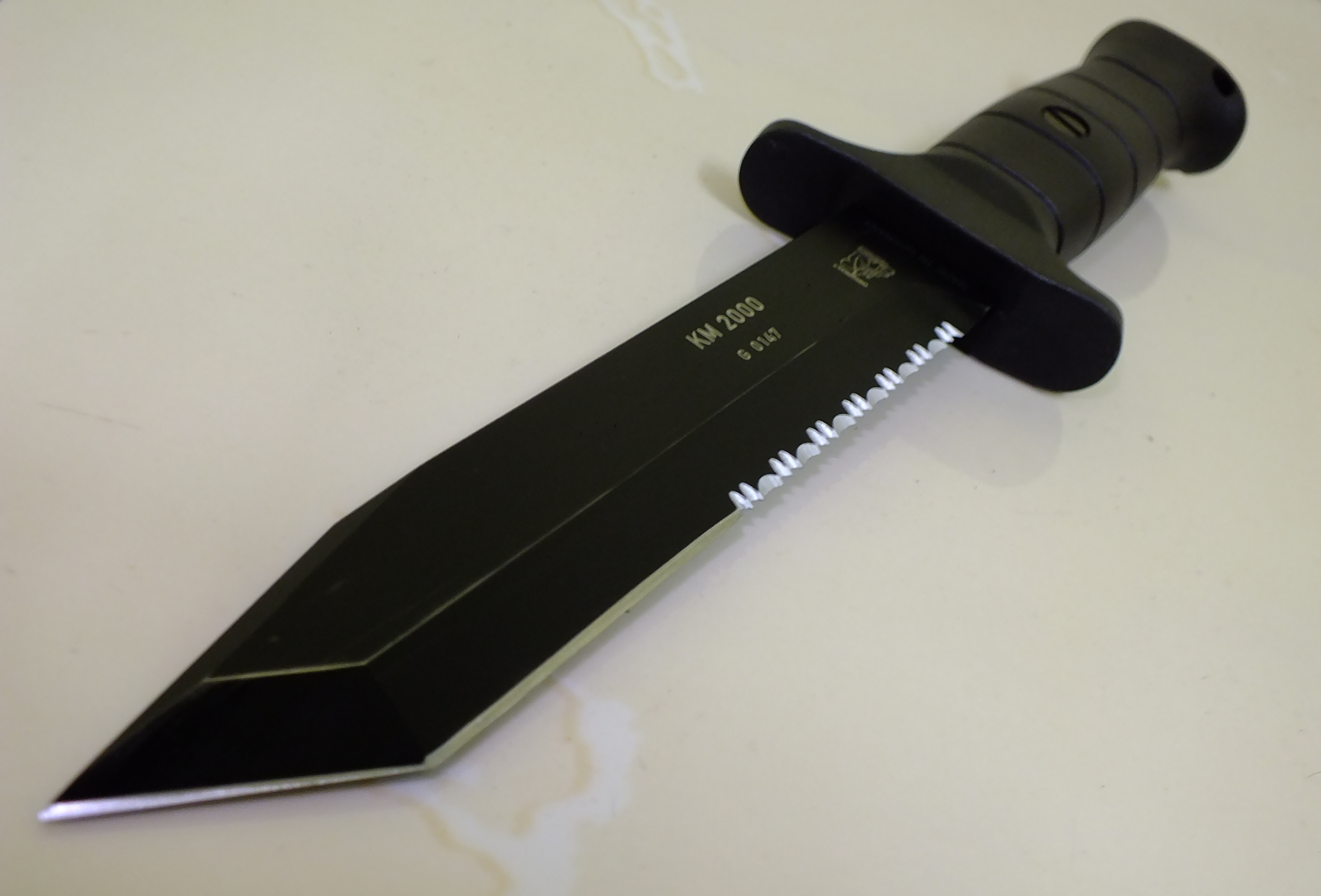
A modern KM2000 of the German Army

Knifemaker Bill Harsey later teamed up with Chris Reeve to design the Yarborough Knife, a combat knife presented to each graduate of the United States Army Special Forces Qualification Course. In the latest step of this evolution, Bill Harsey and Chris Reeve have collaborated with the father of the Modern Army Combatives Program, Matt Larsen, to design the LHR Combat knife.

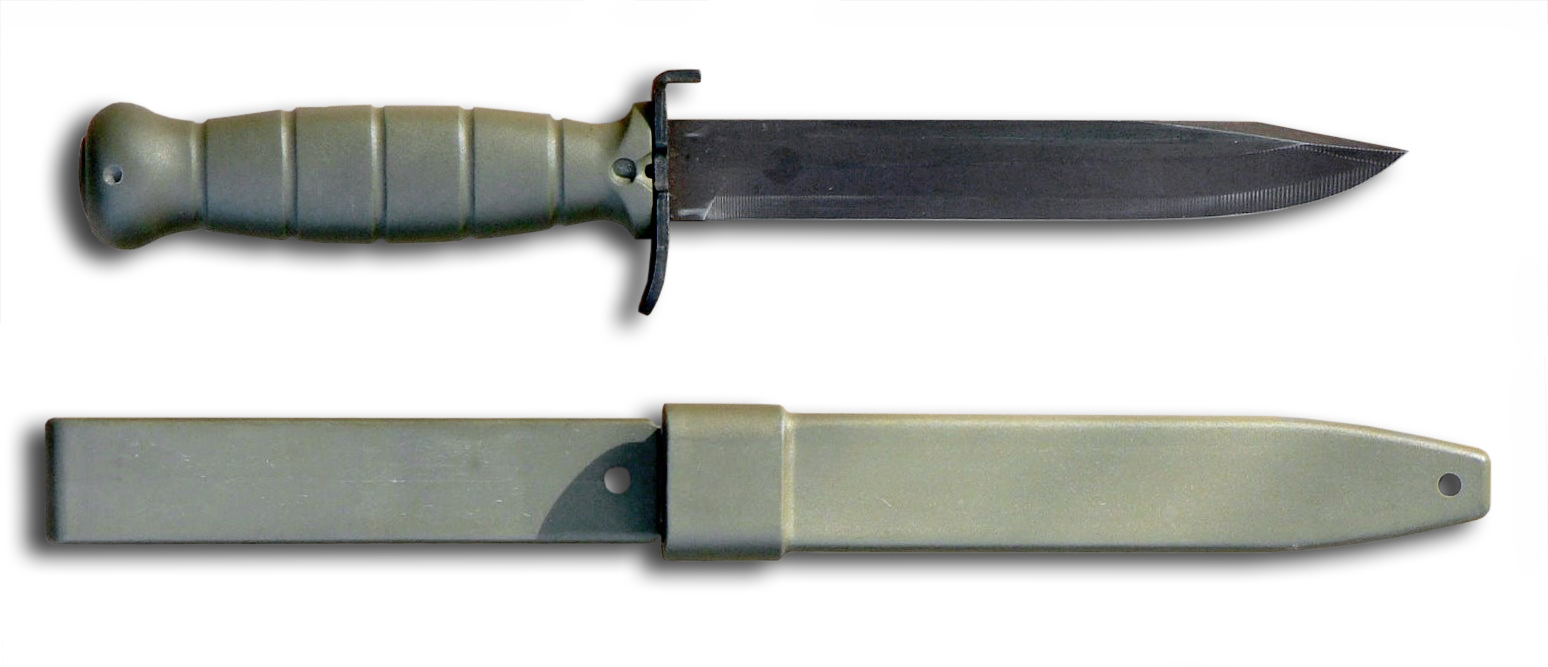
Glock Feldmesser FM 78 and its sheath

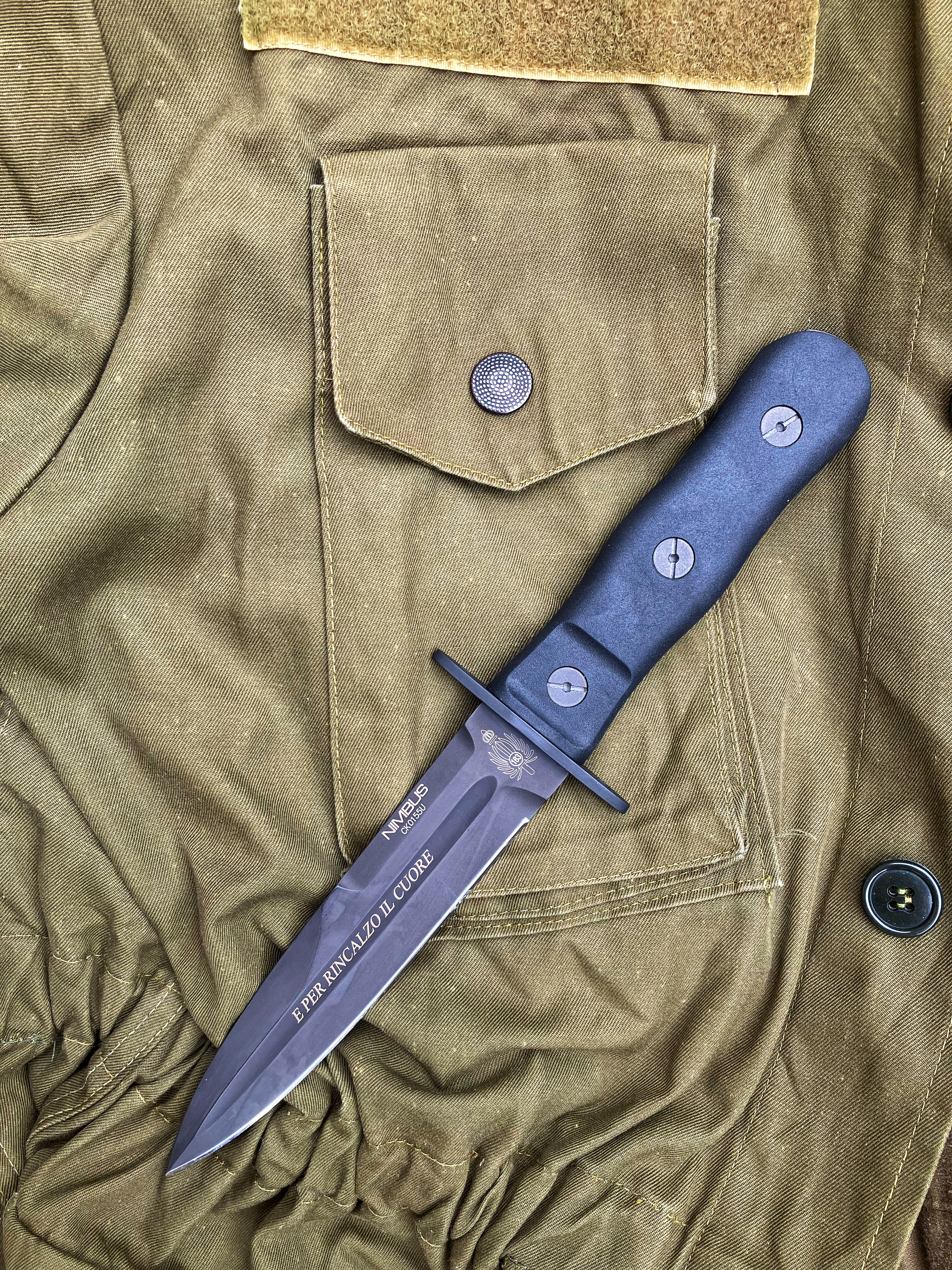
Italian Army combat knife Extrema Ratio NIMBUS

The German military uses the Eickhorn KM2000 as their standard issue knife. The design is a westernized Tantō, issued to the Bundeswehr. The blade is made of either 440A or N695 depending on different models. Some of them use 55Si7 spring steel. The knifemaker Eickhorn in Solingen, Germany has issued KCB-77 bayonets to the Canadian Military and the USMC. Apart from the KM2000 there are many other knives from Eickhorn, the KM3000, KM4000, KM5000, ParaCommando, and Aviator Series knives. The knives from Eickhorn are extremely sturdy and for professional use. Those knives are also preferred by military forces worldwide.

The Austrian Forces use the Glock knife. This is also used as a bayonet for the Steyr AUG bullpup rifle used by Austrian Forces. The blade is made of phosphated carbon steel. The handle is a special strong polymer manufactured by Glock. The Glock knife is also used by special forces around the world.

== See also ==
- Bayonet
- Fighting knife
- Hunting dagger
- Hunting knife
- Knife fight
- Messer
- Rex Applegate
- Survival knife
- Throwing knife
- "Yank" Levy
