= Gerber Mark II =

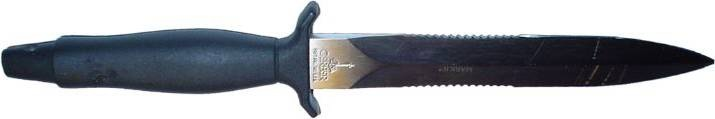
- Gerber Mark II with after market coating on the blade.
- Type: Dagger
- Place of origin: United States

Service history
- In service: 1966
- Wars: Vietnam War

Production history
- Designed: 1966
- Manufacturer: Gerber Legendary Blades
- Produced: 1967–2000; 2008–2022

The Gerber Mark II is a fighting knife manufactured by Gerber Legendary Blades from 1966 to 2000, with an additional limited run of 1500 in 2002, and full production resuming as of July 2008.

== Design ==
The Gerber Mark II was designed by retired Army Captain, Clarence A. “Bud” Holzmann, based the pattern on a Roman Mainz Gladius.

At 12.75 inches (32.39 cm) long it has a 6.5 inch (16.5 cm) 420 HC stainless steel double edged spear point wasp-waisted blade, weighs 8 ounces (226.8g), and has a die cast aluminum handle.

The Mark II has a distinctive look similar to that of the Fairbairn–Sykes fighting knife developed during World War II for the British Commandos.

=== Vietnam War variant ===
During the Vietnam War, the first production run of this knife had a five degree offset between the blade and the grip in order to ride in the sheath more comfortably, and give the user a grip similar to that of a fencing foil.

This design feature led to a significant number of knives being returned by users for having a "bent blade", so Gerber discontinued that element on subsequent production runs.

== Use ==
The Mark II was commonly carried by troops for the United States in the Vietnam War, and was second only to the Ka-Bar knife in fame.

In the 1970s, the military's base/post exchanges discontinued selling these knives, reasoning that they were "not in good taste" or "too brutal".

Al Mar, then working for Gerber as a knife designer, added the sawtooth serrations toward the hilt, marketing the knife as a "survival aid", making it more appealing to the PX System, which resumed selling the Mark II as a survival knife, rather than a fighting knife.

== Variant ==
=== Mark I ===
The Mark I was a scaled down version of the Mark II. It had a 4.75 inch (12 cm) blade and was marketed as a boot knife.

== Users ==
- United States

== In popular culture ==
- The MK II was the suggested blade in Paladin Press's controversial how to book, Hit Man: A Technical Manual for Independent Contractors.
- The Mark II gained additional fame when it was used by Mel Gibson in his role of Max Rockatansky in the film of 1981, The Road Warrior.
- The black coated blade model of the Mark II was used during the mess hall knife game scene in the science fiction film Aliens.
- The film Captain America: The Winter Soldier (2014) features the Winter Soldier using a Mark II in a fight with Captain America.
- During a scene in Man of Steel (2013), Colonel Nathan Hardy (portrayed by actor Christopher Meloni) uses a Mark II in an attempt to fight the Kryptonian lieutenant Faora Hu-Ul, before Superman intervenes.
- Casey Ryback (Steven Seagal) uses a Mark II throughout the film Under Siege (1992) most notably during the finale against William Strannix (Tommy Lee Jones)

== See also ==
- List of daggers
- List of individual weapons of the U.S. Armed Forces
- OKC-3S Bayonet
- M9 bayonet
- Strider SMF
- SARK
- CQC-6
- Commander (knife)
- Mark 3 Knife
