= Applegate–Fairbairn fighting knife =

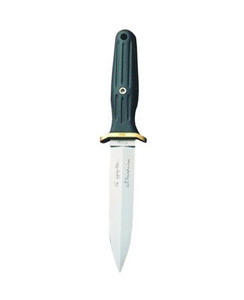
- Type: Dagger
- Place of origin: United States

Production history
- Designer: William Ewart Fairbairn and Rex Applegate
- Designed: 1941
- Manufacturer: Al Mar Knives, Blackjack Knives, Gerber Legendary Blades, Böker

Specifications
- Length: 11 inches (28 cm)
- Blade length: 6 inches (15 cm)
- Blade type: Dagger
- Hilt type: lexan
- Scabbard/sheath: leather
- Head type: Brass

The Applegate–Fairbairn fighting knife is a combat knife designed by Colonel Rex Applegate and William E. Fairbairn as a version of the Fairbairn–Sykes fighting knife.

== History ==
While Applegate was a student of Fairbairn, he came up with a series of modifications to Fairbairn's Dagger and worked with Fairbairn on implementing them. Applegate first approached Randall Made Knives with their design.

Bo Randall made a handful of prototypes based on his "Model 2 Dagger" and sent them to soldiers for field testing; they proved not to be popular with the troops and Randall declined to produce the knife beyond the original prototypes.

Applegate took the design to custom knifemaker Bill Harsey, Jr. who made several prototypes for Al Mar Knives. In 1995, Harsey would design a folding version for Gerber Legendary Blades, which won the 1996 International Blade Show "American Made Knife of the Year" award.

After Al Mar ceased production of the A–F fighting knife, a number of variations were made by Blackjack Knives, Gerber and Böker Knives, all with limited degrees of success. The US Military Stock Number for the Gerber folding version is NSN: 5110-01-436-1548.

== Design ==
The Applegate–Fairbairn fighting knife's blade has a similar double-edged dagger profile, but is wider and more durable.

It features a different handle, made most commonly of Lexan plastic with adjustable lead weights which can change the knife's balance-point.

Later models and some custom variants included weights made from pure Teflon, tungsten, stainless steel and aluminum. The blade profile was also changed from a V-grind to a convex, or "appleseed" profile.

While this changed the effectiveness of the blade in puncturing, cutting and slicing, it does not lend itself to being sharpened in the field by an inexperienced user. In addition to these modifications, the tang was also strengthened.

The current production model made by Böker in Solingen, Germany, uses a fiberglass reinforced delrin handle which solves the issues with earlier models where the handle would crack if exposed to heat.

== Variants ==
=== Related UK-SFK knife ===
The post World War 2 UK-SFK (United Kingdom Special Forces Knife) was designed by Micheal Janich specifically for and issued to British special forces and followed the Applegate–Fairbairn fighting knife blade design with a differing grip borrowed from the XFS-1 dagger designed by Brent Beshara.
