= Applegath =

Applegath is a surname. Notable people with the surname include:

- Augustus Applegath (1788–1871), English printer and inventor

== See also ==
- Applegate (surname)
