= Applegate (surname) =

Applegate is an English surname. Notable people with the surname include:

- Andrew J. Applegate (1833–1870), American politician
- Celia Applegate, American historian
- Christina Applegate (born 1971), American actress
- Colleen Applegate (1963–1984), American actress known as Shauna Grant
- Dan Applegate, American engineer
- David Applegate, American computer scientist
- Debby Applegate (born 1968), American historian and biographer
- Dick Applegate, British army general
- Douglas Applegate (1928–2021), American politician
- Eddie Applegate (1935–2016), American actor
- Fred Applegate (baseball) (1879–1968), American baseball player
- Fred Applegate (actor) (born 1953), American actor, singer and dancer
- James L. Applegate (1931–2006), American politician
- Jesse Applegate (1811–1888), American pioneer
- Jessica-Jane Applegate (born 1996), British swimmer
- Jodi Applegate (born 1964), American news anchor
- John Stilwell Applegate (1837–1916), American politician, lawyer and writer
- Joseph R. Applegate (1925–2003), American linguist
- K. A. Applegate (born 1956), American author
- Lindsay Applegate (1808–1892), American pioneer
- Oliver Cromwell Applegate (1845–1938), American politician
- Red Applegate (1921–1965), American boxer
- Rex Applegate (1914–1998), American military close combat instructor in World War II
- Royce D. Applegate (1939–2003), American actor and screenwriter
- Shannon Applegate, American historian
