= BC-41 =

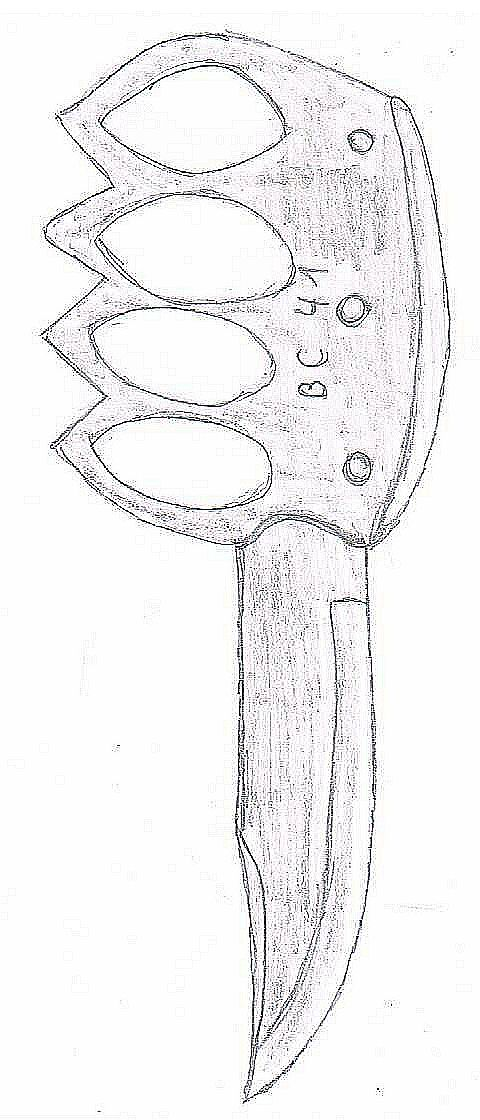
- BC-41 Commando Knife
- Type: Combined knuckleduster and dagger
- Place of origin: United Kingdom

Service history
- Used by: British Commandos
- Wars: World War II

Specifications
- Length: About 8-12 inches

The BC-41 was a combined knuckleduster and dagger weapon used by the British Commandos during World War II for close combat and ambushes. Although effective, it was eventually replaced by the Fairbairn–Sykes fighting knife.

== See also ==
- Combat knife
- Yarara Parachute Knife
- Mark I trench knife
- Special Air Service
- Royal Marines
