= Cold Steel (company) =

American knife and tool company

Cold Steel Inc.
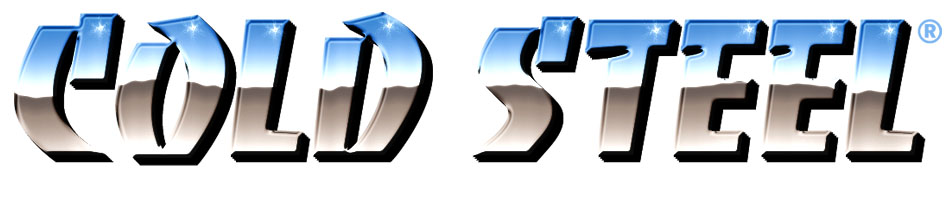

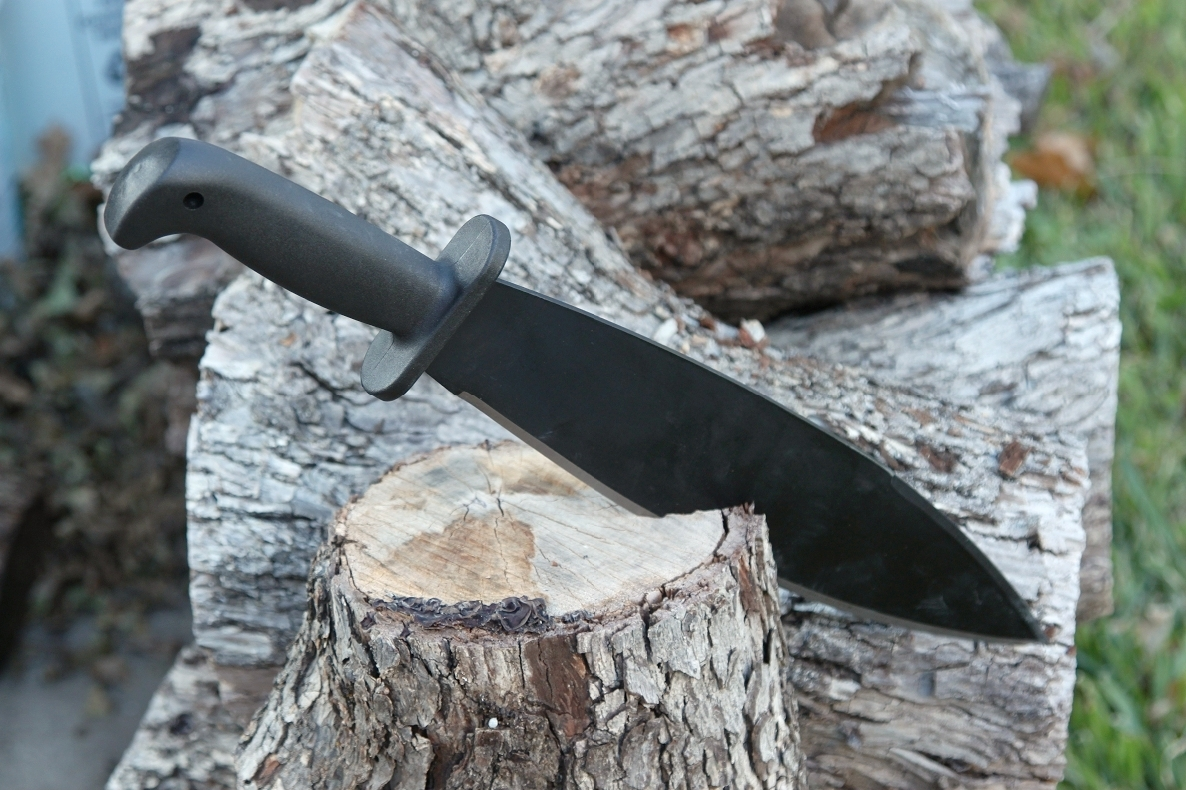
- Cold Steel smatchet machete
- Type: Subsidiary
- Industry: Manufacturing
- Founded: 1980; 46 years ago
- Founder: Lynn Thompson (President & Founder)
- Headquarters: Irving, TX 75061, United States
- Key people: Andrew Demko, Robert Vaughn, Ron Balicki, Luke LaFontaine, Anthony DeLongis
- Products: Knives, swords, tomahawks, pepper spray, machetes, spears, blowguns, axes, martial arts & self defense-related products and training tools
- Parent: GSM Outdoors
- Website: www.coldsteel.com

Cold Steel, Inc., is an American retailer of knives/bladed tools, training weapons, swords and other martial arts edged and blunt weapons. Founded in Ventura, California, the company is currently based in Irving, Texas, after an acquisition by GSM Outdoors in 2020. Cold Steel products are manufactured worldwide, including in the United States, Japan, Taiwan, India, Italy, China, and South Africa.

== Products ==
The company's products include fixed-blade knives, folding knives, swords, machetes, tomahawks, kukris, blowguns, walking sticks, tantōs and other martial arts items and training equipment. The knives are used by military and law-enforcement personnel worldwide.

Cold Steel is credited with popularizing the American tantō in 1980. Cold Steel marketed knives made in the U.S. by Camillus using a carbon steel given the trademarked name "Carbon V" (read "carbon five"). Their imported knives were nearly all made in Seki, Japan, using AUS-8 which Cold Steel labelled "400 Series Stainless". They also had two models made in Taiwan, both of which switched to Japan in 2000. In 2007 Camillus New York went bankrupt, and Cold Steel was forced to find a new manufacturer for their carbon-steel fixed blades. Cold Steel first went to China (People's Republic of China), but allegedly due to quality issues switched to Taiwan for production. At the same time Cold Steel moved all folding-knife manufacturing from Seki Japan to Taiwan. The carbon steel was SK5 and stainless was AUS-8A & 10A, both imported to Taiwan from Japan. However, the Sanmai III models remained strictly Seki production. The largest Sanmai III fixed blades are made by Hattori.

Seki City production knives are made using VG1 stainless steel and VG1 core Sanmai III. Current and past models have used: German 4116 stainless steel, D2, 1055 high-carbon steel, O-1 high-carbon, SK-5 carbon steel, AUS 8A & 10A, CTS XHP, CPM S35VN, and CPM 3V tool steel.

Cold Steel's folding knives are renowned for their lock strength, due to the TRI-AD Lock, designed by custom knifemaker Andrew Demko.

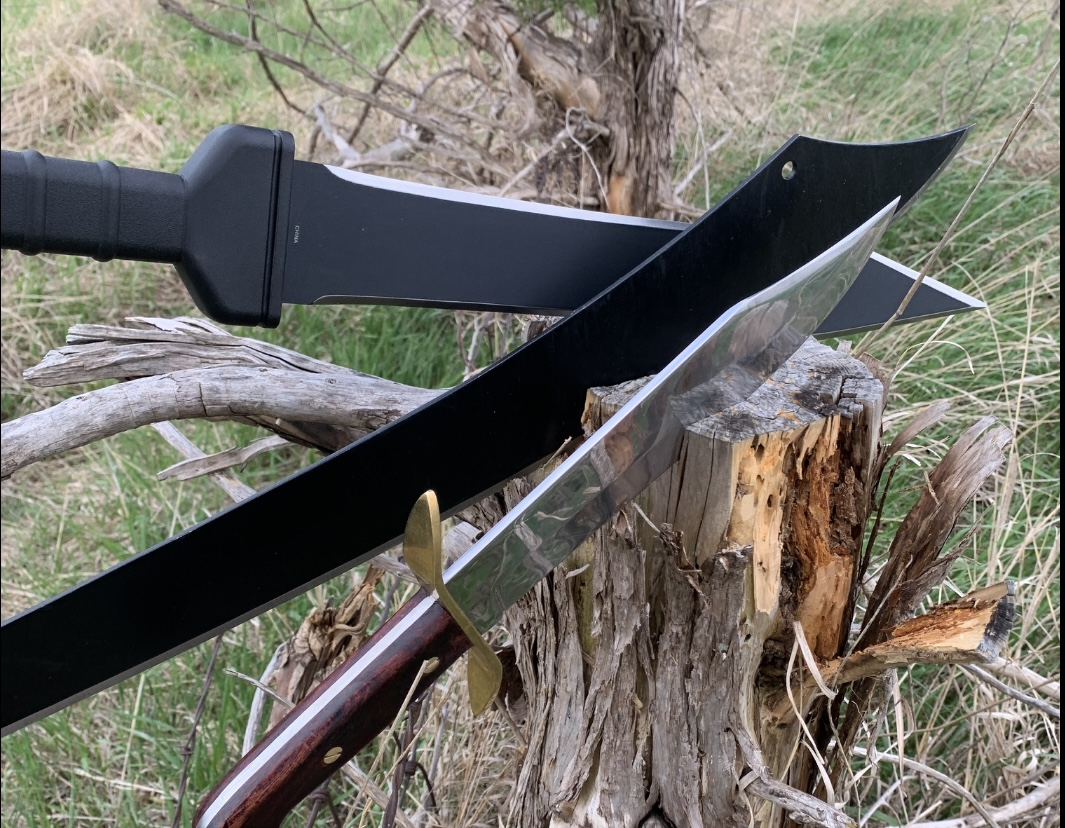
Cold Steel Western Bowie knife and Machetes

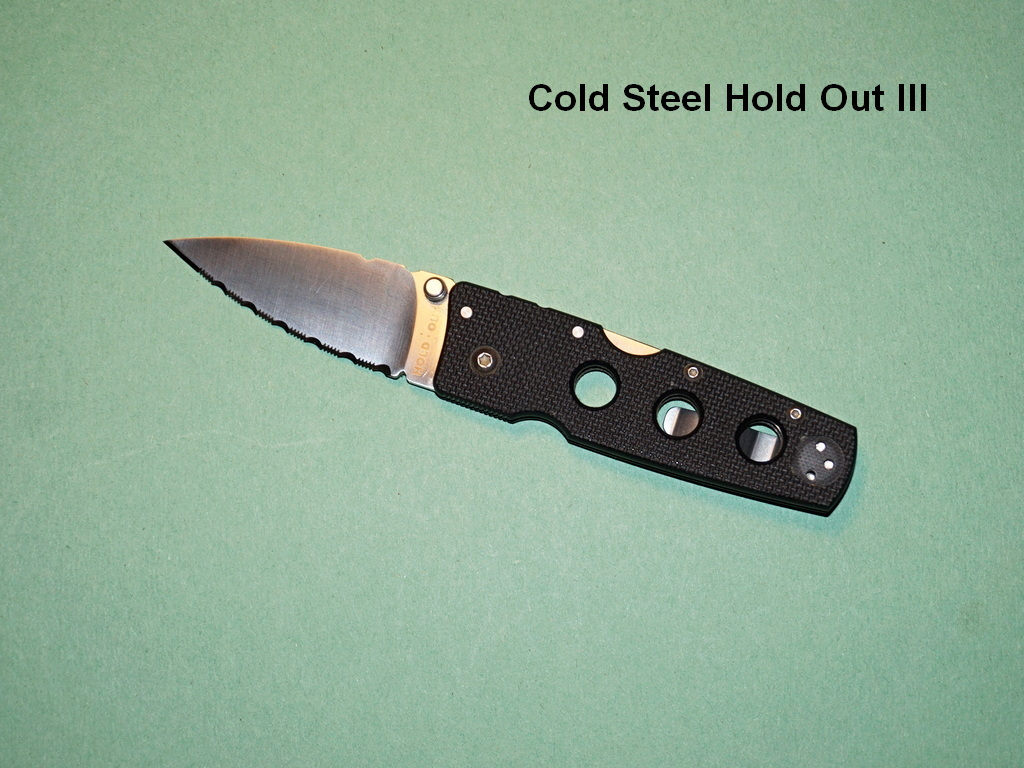
Cold Steel Hold Out lll

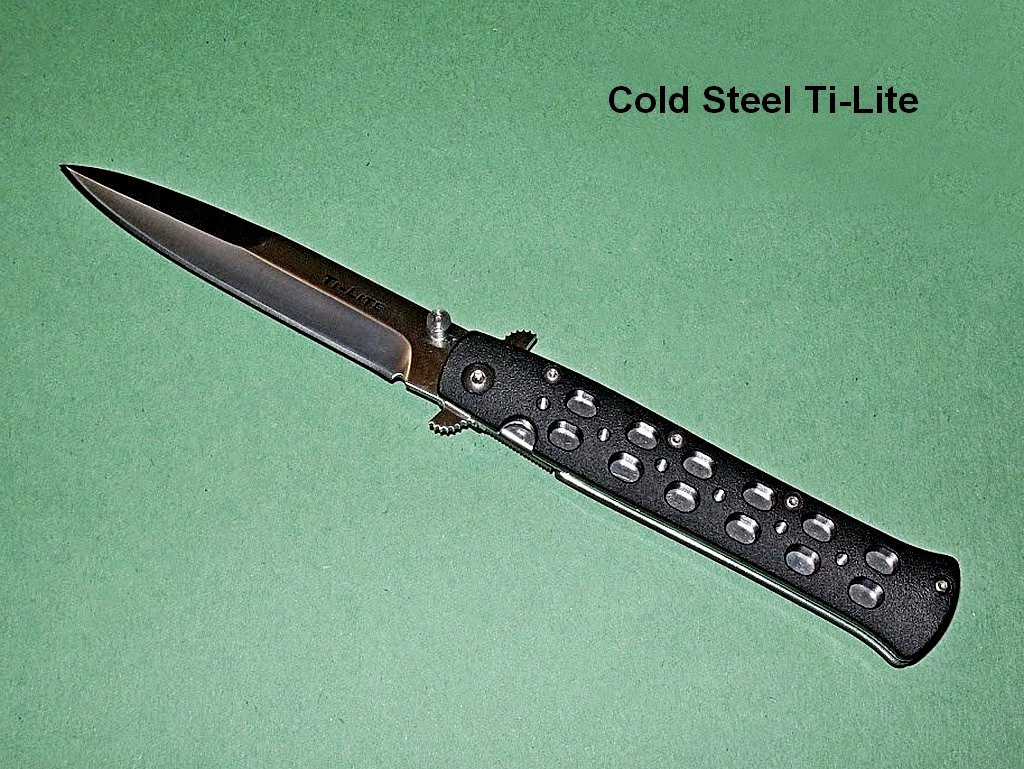
Cold Steel Ti-Lite

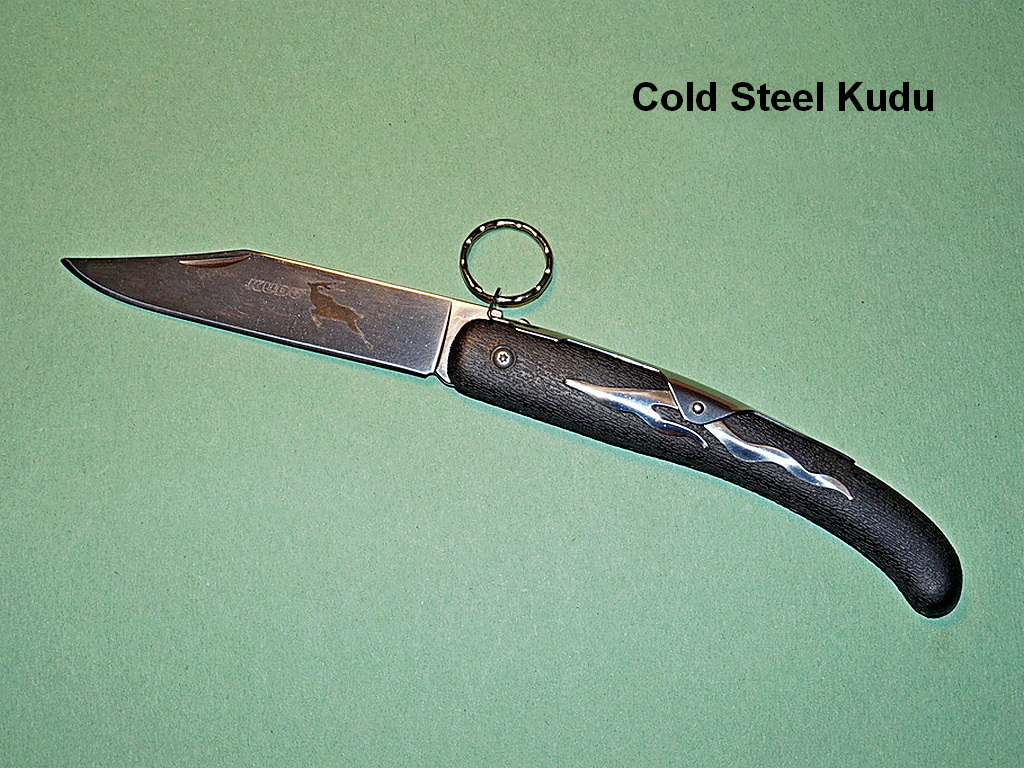
Cold Steel Kubu

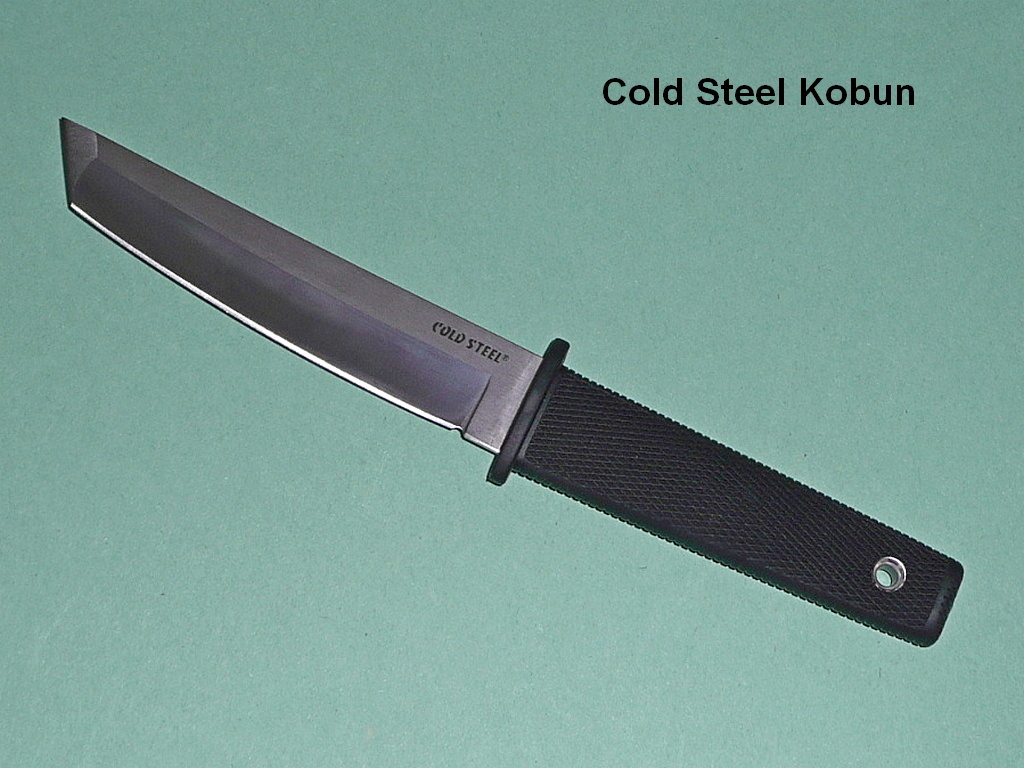
Cold Steel Kobun

Cold Steel's swords are primarily made from 1055 high-carbon steel and pattern welded steels that mimic ancient Damascus steel.

Many of Cold Steel's products are designed by company President Lynn C Thompson and based upon traditional knife designs from all over the world, but Cold Steel has also collaborated with custom knifemakers such as Andrew Demko, Phil Boguszewski, Zach Whitson, Steven Likarich, Keith Dehart, Rich McDonald, Bob Koga, Fred Perrin and Lloyd Pendleton on certain designs.

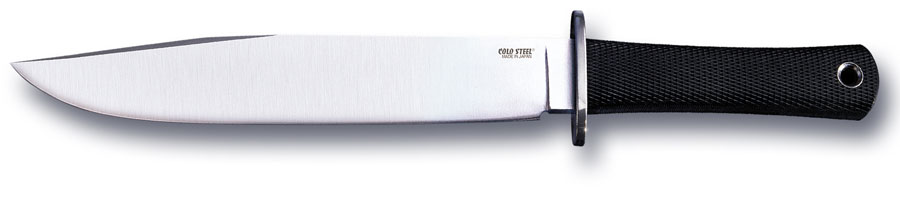
Cold Steel Trailmaster

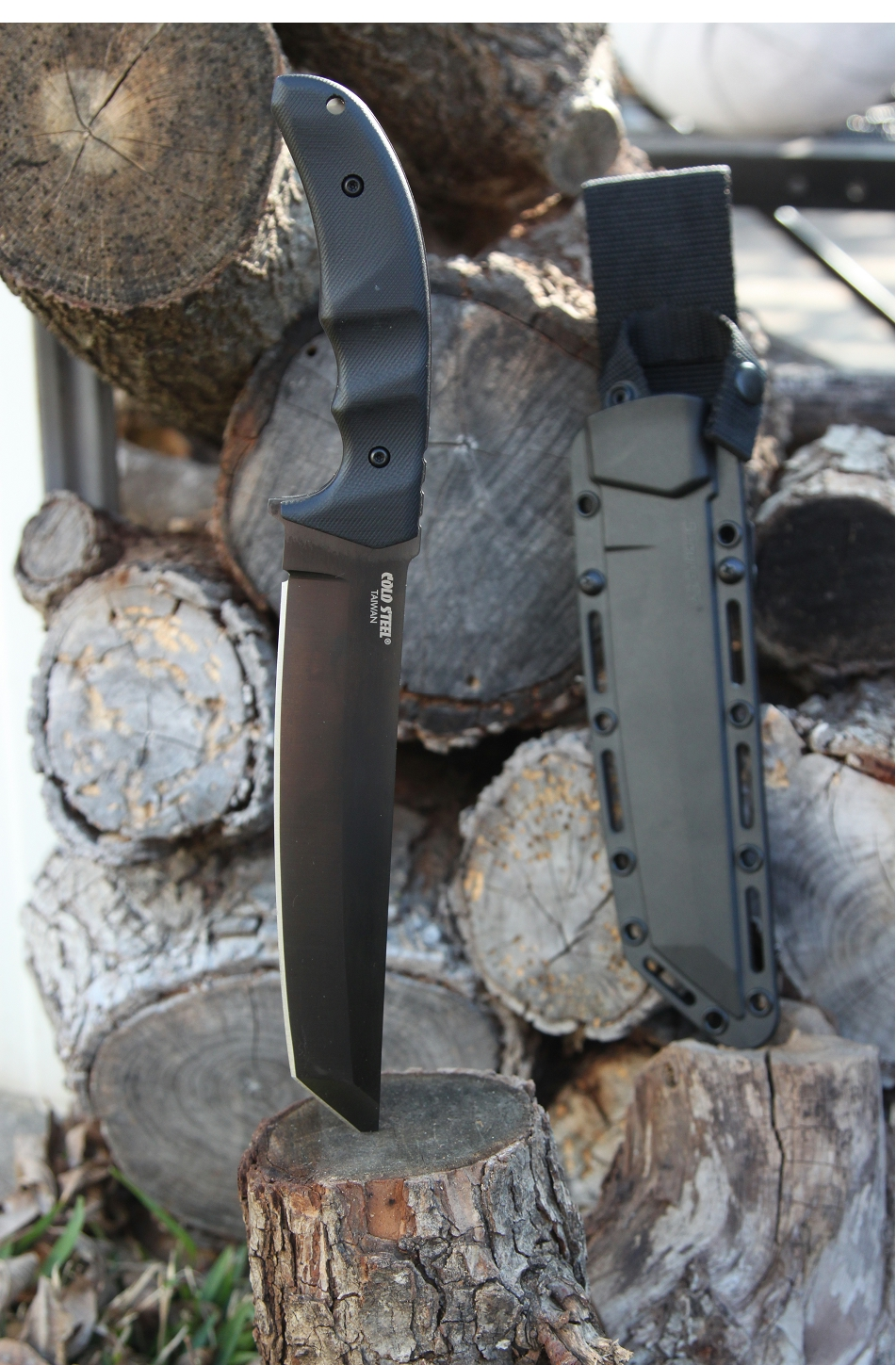
Cold Steel Large Warcraft Tanto knife with Black Hills Ammunition Company cartouche. Carbon steel with high chromium content +vanadium. Blade Length: 7 1/2"; Length overall: 12 3/4"; Steel: U.S. CPM 3-V High Carbon; Weight: 13 oz; Blade Thickness: 0.2"; Handle: 4 3/4" long G-10 Sheath: Secure-Ex®

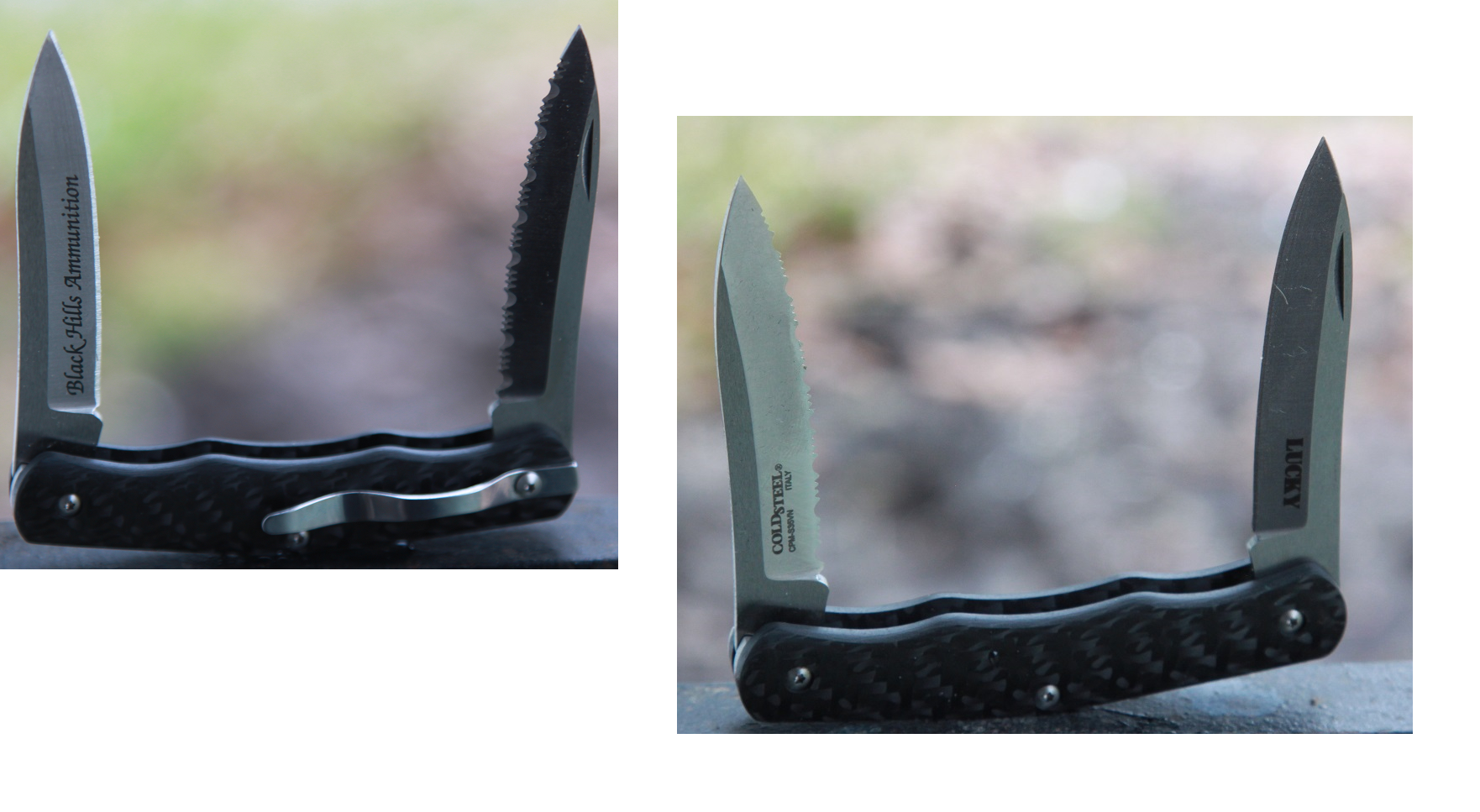
Cold Steel "Lucky" Gentleman's pen knife made in Italy of S35VN Steel, with 2 5/8" blades.

== Marketing ==
Cold Steel is known for their graphic marketing videos and DVDs (entitled "PROOF") which demonstrate their products' strength, sharpness, edge retention and durability. Featured tests include piercing car hoods, using folding knives as monkey bars, slicing through large free-hanging pieces of meat and animal carcass, stabbing/slashing ballistic gel mannequins, and cutting tatami rolls and free-hanging polyester rope with a single stroke.

== In the media ==
Cold Steel's products feature heavily in movies, TV shows, games and web series. Their knives have seen prominent use in numerous action movies since the early 1980s.

Many of Cold Steel's employees are martial artists and weapons experts, who feature in their infamous marketing videos. Some of the members of their "crew" are also Hollywood stunt men, fight choreographers and trainers, most notably Ron Balicki, Luke LaFontaine and Anthony De Longis.

Thompson also writes regular articles regarding the use of knives for self-defense.

== Special Projects division ==
Special Projects was a division of Cold Steel Inc. that sold a line of tools and weapons such as Spetsnaz-type shovels, sjamboks, and spears. The Special Projects division was closed and many of its products discontinued after Cold Steel's acquisition by GSM Outdoors; those remaining were absorbed into the main Cold Steel brand.

Additionally, a line of tomahawks, axes, and hammers was marketed under the name of The American Tomahawk Company.
