= All-In Fighting =

British hand-to-hand combat manual

- Author: William E. Fairbairn
- Subject: hand-to-hand combat
- Publication date: 1942
- Publication place: UK
- Pages: 130
- ISBN: 978-1-58160-506-8

All-In Fighting is a hand-to-hand combat manual used by British Commandos during World War II. The book illustrated the use of the commando dagger and unarmed combat skills.

In addition to unarmed combat skills, All-In Fighting also includes a section by Captain P.N. Walbridge on how to use and shoot the Lee-Enfield rifle, the Pattern 1914 Enfield rifle, and the M1917 Enfield in close-quarters combat.
