= Rex Applegate =

American combat expert (1914–1998)

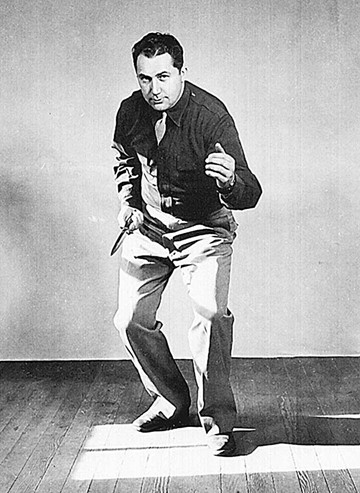
- Lt. Col. Rex Applegate demonstrating his knife fighting technique.
- Born: Rex Applegate; June 21, 1914; Yoncalla, Oregon, U.S.
- Died: July 14, 1998 (aged 84); San Diego, California, U.S.
- Occupations: Author and journalist
- Spouse(s): Edith, Carole
- Children: Shannon Applegate (daughter), Rex Applegate (son), Lisha Allen (daughter)
- Writing career
- Period: 1943–1998
- Genre: Combatives

Rex Applegate (June 21, 1914 – July 14, 1998) was an American military officer who worked for the Office of Strategic Services, where he trained Allied special forces personnel in close-quarters combat during World War II. He held the rank of colonel.

== Early life ==
Applegate was born on June 21, 1914, in Oregon. He was a descendant of Charles Applegate, who blazed the Oregon Trail in 1843 with his brothers Jesse and Lindsay and established the Applegate Trail. Applegate began hunting and shooting at a young age and learned marksmanship from his uncle Gus Peret who was a famed exhibition shooter and professional hunter at the time. Applegate graduated from the University of Oregon with a Business Degree in 1940 and went on to take a commission in the US Army as a second lieutenant. His first billet was with the 209th Military Police Company as a lung ailment kept him from holding a combat position.

== World War II ==
In 1941, Applegate was developing armed and unarmed close quarter combat courses for the US Army at Camp Ritchie when he was recruited by Wild Bill Donovan for the OSS, specifically to build and run what was called "The School for Spies and Assassins", the location of which is now Camp David. Donovan had Applegate learn all that he could about armed and unarmed fighting from William E. Fairbairn to form a brutal and effective system. He was the close-combat coordinator for all clandestine missions and this role brought him into contact with other fighters and martial artists of the time period such as a Finnish soldier who killed 21 Russians with a knife, and the founder of the British SAS: David Stirling.

At one point during the war, he served as the personal bodyguard to President Franklin D Roosevelt.

== Postwar life ==
After the close of World War II, Applegate spent the next 15 years as an advisor to the government of Mexico who made him an "Honorary General".

Applegate was friends with actor John Wayne and in addition to teaching Wayne how to shoot, Applegate served as a technical advisor on the set of The Alamo. Applegate was said to be the source and inspiration for several of Ian Fleming's characters in the James Bond novels.

When not traveling to promote his pistol-shooting methods, Applegate spent his last years in Yoncalla, Oregon and at his home in Scottsburg, Oregon. Applegate's daughter is Shannon Applegate.

== Battle methods ==
=== Unarmed combat ===
In 1943 he wrote Kill or Get Killed, which is still considered a classic manual of Western-style hand-to-hand combat. The updated 1976 edition of Kill or Get Killed was published by the US Marine Corps as Fleet Marine Force Reference Publication 12-80. From the foreword:

Fleet Marine Force Reference Publication (FMFRP) 12-80, Kill or Get Killed, is published to ensure the retention and dissemination of useful information which is not intended to become doctrine or to be published in Fleet Marine Force manuals.

and

This reference publication was written in 1976 by Lieutenant Colonel Rex Applegate, USA (Ret), with the help of the Combat Section, Military Intelligence Training Center, Camp Ritchie, Maryland. At last there is one volume which speaks to the subjects of unarmed combat (offensive and defensive), combat use of weapons, disarming the enemy, handling of prisoners, the handle of mob/crowd disobedience, the use of chemicals in such situations, and how to establish a professional riot control unit.

Applegate developed the techniques outlined in the book during his work with William E. Fairbairn, who had previously developed his own techniques while working for the Shanghai Municipal Police from 1907 to 1940. Fairbairn drew heavily on Chinese martial arts, which he simplified and tailored to the needs of police training in one of the world's most crime-ridden cities, due to its history of crime related to the opium trade, the rebellion, and the activities of Triad gangsters. His result was the development of Defendu, widely considered the first of what became known as modern combatives. Applegate's techniques are heavily based on Fairbairn's Defendu, enhanced with feedback from the OSS operatives who put his techniques into action during World War II.

=== Combat handgun techniques ===
Applegate was a proponent of the combat pistol shooting system outlined in Kill or Get Killed, which is based on point shooting with a strong emphasis on training for close-range, fast-response shooting. This system is somewhat at odds with another prominent system (developed and promoted by Jeff Cooper) called the modern technique. Both systems have many supporters, with variants of Cooper's system being more commonly used. Supporters of Cooper's methods point to the near-universal use of his system in the International Practical Shooting Confederation and other forms of action shooting, while Applegate's supporters point to police incidents where officers trained in Cooper's methods discharge many rounds at close range (most measured in tens of feet (3 m) or less) with few (if any) disabling hits. The last years of Applegate's life were spent promoting his combat-pistol-shooting methods to police agencies. Applegate co-wrote The Close-Combat Files of Colonel Rex Applegate (with Chuck Melson), and was a founding member of the International Close Combat Instructors Association.

=== Combat knife innovations ===
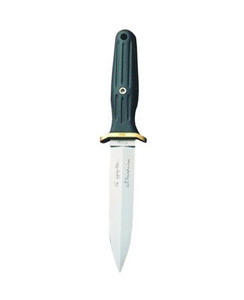
Applegate–Fairbairn fighting knife

In the early 1980s, Applegate released a design called the Applegate-Fairbairn fighting knife (a modified version of the World War II Fairbairn-Sykes knife). The new knife's design was a collaborative effort by Applegate and Fairbairn during World War II, eliminating the major weaknesses of the F-S knife (among them a weak blade point and the impossibility of determining the blade's orientation by grip alone). Boker Knives offers several versions of the A-F knife. Gerber Legendary Blades produced a line of folding knives by Applegate and Bill Harsey, Jr. based on the Applegate-Fairbairn fighting knife.

In the late 1980s Applegate released a modified version of Fairbairn's Smatchet, which had been used by the SAS and OSS during World War II. The development of this weapon began as a collaborative effort between Applegate and Fairbairn during the war. Applegate named his 10-inch (25 cm) double-edged knife the "Applegate-Fairbairn Combat Smatchet"; it was initially offered as a handmade knife by Bill Harsey, Jr., and later by Wells Creek Gun and Knife Works, and after that by Al Mar Knives. Following Mar's death, Böker Knives was licensed to produce it. Applegate later had Harsey design a "Mini-Smatchet" (with a 4.75-inch (12.1 cm) blade) which was produced by Boker.

Applegate was inducted into the Blade Magazine Cutlery Hall of Fame at the 1994 Blade Show in Atlanta, Georgia in recognition of the impact his designs have made upon the cutlery industry and for his writings on knife fighting.

== Books by Applegate ==
- Kill or Get Killed: A Manual of Hand-to-Hand Fighting (Military Service Publishing Co., 1943)
- Riot Control: Materiel and Techniques (Stackpole Company, 1969)
- Kill or Get killed: Riot Control Techniques, Manhandling, and Close Combat (Paladin Press, 1976) ISBN 9780873640848
- Scouting and Patrolling: Ground Reconnaissance Principles and Training (Paladin Press, 1980)
- Combat Use of the Double-Edged Fighting Knife (Paladin Press, 1993)
- The Close-Combat Files of Col. Rex Applegate (Paladin Press, 1998)
- (with Michael Janich) Bullseyes Don't Shoot Back: The Complete Textbook of Point Shooting (Paladin Press, 1998) ISBN 978-0873649575

== See also ==
- Combat knife
- "Yank" Levy
