= Shannon Applegate =

American author, lecturer and historian

Shannon Applegate is an American author, lecturer, and historian from the state of Oregon. Her works include Skookum: An Oregon Pioneer Family's History and Lore (1988) and Living Among Headstones: Life in a Country Cemetery (2005). She is also the co-editor of Talking on Paper: Oregon Letters and Diaries, sixth edition (1993).

In 2007, she was named one of the eight recipients to be given the Governor's Arts Awards for 2006-2007 by Ted Kulongoski.

She is a direct descendant of Charles Applegate who blazed the Oregon Trail in 1843 along with his brothers, Jesse Applegate and Lindsay Applegate. Her father was Rex Applegate, the author of military and police training manuals.

She lives with her husband, Daniel Robertson, on 110 acres (0.45 km^{2}) of the land that was a part of Charles Applegate's original donation land claim. Their home is the "oldest house in the State of Oregon still occupied by its original family."
