= William E. Fairbairn =

British Royal Marine (1885–1960)

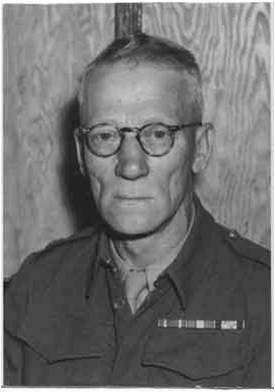
- Fairbairn in 1942
- Born: William Ewart Fairbairn; 28 February 1885; Rickmansworth, Hertfordshire, England
- Died: 20 June 1960 (aged 75); Worthing, Sussex, England
- Occupations: Royal Marines, Shanghai Municipal Police, Combatives Instructor

Lieutenant Colonel William Ewart Fairbairn (/ˈfɛərbɛərn/; 28 February 1885 – 20 June 1960) was a British soldier and police officer. He developed hand-to-hand combat methods for the Shanghai Police during the interwar period, as well as for the Allied special forces during World War II. He created his own fighting system known as Defendu. Notably, this included innovative pistol shooting techniques and the development of the Fairbairn–Sykes fighting knife.

== Military career ==
Fairbairn served with the Royal Marine Light Infantry starting in 1901, and joined the Shanghai Municipal Police (SMP) in 1907. He served in one of the red light districts. During his service with the International Police in Shanghai, Fairbairn reportedly engaged in hundreds of street fights in the course of his duties during a twenty-year career. Much of his body, arms, legs, torso, even the palms of his hands, were covered with scars from knife wounds from those fights. Fairbairn later created, organised, trained and commanded a special anti-riot squad for the Shanghai police force. He also developed numerous firearms training courses and items of police equipment, including a special metal-lined bulletproof vest designed to stop high-velocity bullets from the 7.63x25mm Mauser pistol.

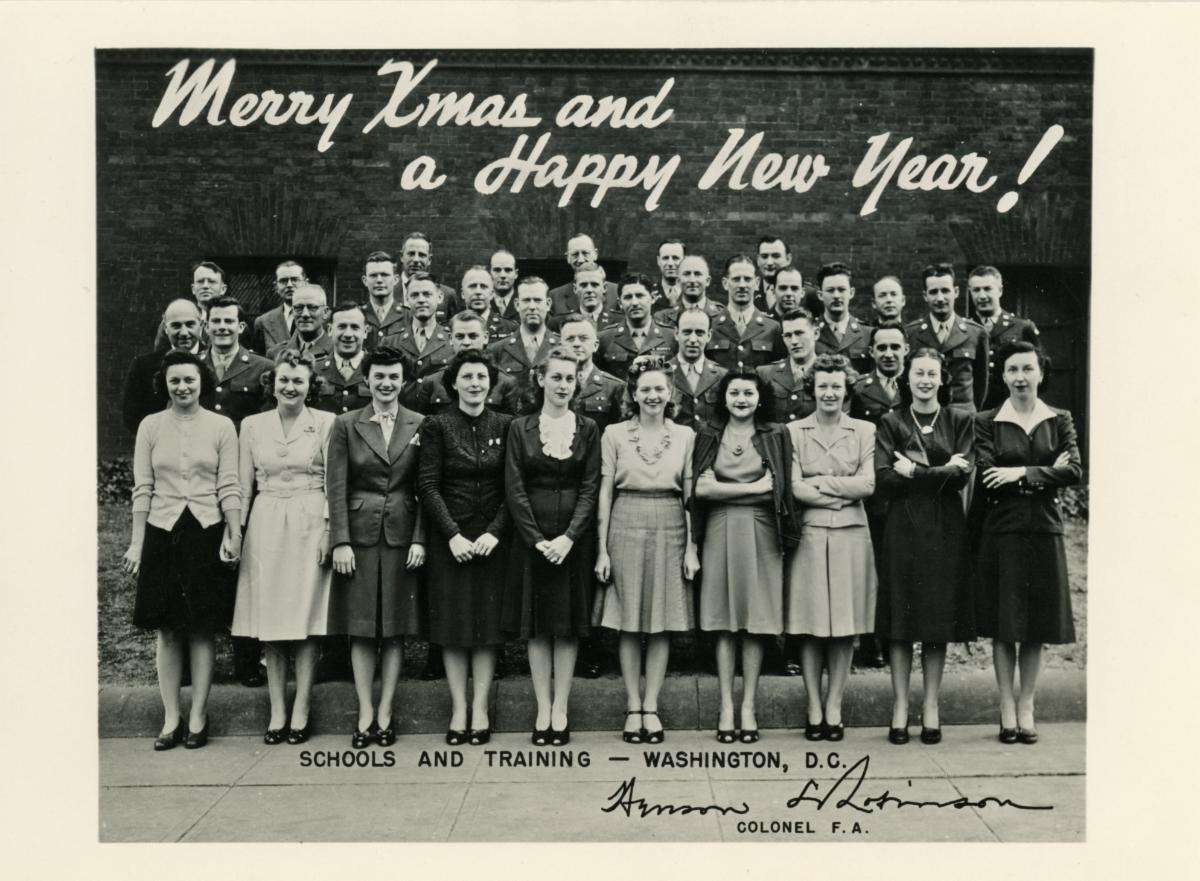
OSS Schools and Training Headquarters Staff, 1945 XMAS Card LTC Fairbairn second from the left in third row.

During World War II, he was recruited by the British Special Operations Executive as an Army officer; he was given the nickname "Dangerous Dan". Together with fellow close-combat instructor Eric Sykes, Fairbairn was commissioned with the General List in 1941. Fairbairn and Sykes were both commissioned as second lieutenants on 15 July 1940. He trained British, American and Canadian Commandos and No. 2 Dutch Troop 10th Inter-Allied Commando forces, US Rangers candidates, and personnel of the Office of Strategic Services (OSS), mainly for close-combat, pistol-shooting and knife-fighting techniques. Fairbairn emphasised the necessity of forgetting any idea of gentlemanly conduct or fighting fair: "Get tough, get down in the gutter, win at all costs... I teach what is called 'Gutter Fighting.' There's no fair play, no rules except one: kill or be killed," he declared. One of his pupils was Raymond Westerling, who fought behind enemy lines in Burma and Indonesia.

In 1941, he appeared in a training movie titled "Unarmed Combat", demonstrating many of the strikes, holds and throws of Defendu, for use by the Home Guard, Commandos, and military services. This training movie was narrated by actor David Niven, who had joined the Commandos early in the war, and was trained by Fairbairn himself. In 1942, Fairbairn appeared, again uncredited, in an OSS training movie titled "OSS Training Center", directed by John Ford. Fairbairn again demonstrated unarmed combat, and also his version of "Point Shooting", later adopted and refined by Rex Applegate for use by the U.S. Army.

For his achievements in training OSS personnel, Fairbairn was promoted eventually to the rank of Lieutenant-Colonel by the end of the war, and received the U.S. Legion of Merit (Officer grade) at the specific request of OSS-founder "Wild Bill" Donovan.

== Martial arts ==
After joining the SMP, he studied boxing, wrestling, savate, Shin no Shinto ryu jujutsu (Yoshin ryu) from Okada-sensei, Kodokan judo in which he gained a 2nd dan black belt, and then Chinese martial arts. He developed his own fighting system—Defendu—and taught it to members of that police force in order to reduce officer fatalities. He described this system as based primarily on his personal experience, which according to police records included some 600 non-training fights, by his retirement at age 55 from the job of Assistant Commissioner in 1940.

In 1951, he went to Cyprus to train police and in 1952 (and 1956) Fairbairn provided training to the Singapore Police Force's Riot Squad unit, which is now Police Tactical Unit.

== Weapons innovations ==
Together with Eric A. Sykes, Fairbairn developed innovative pistol shooting techniques and handgun specifications for the SMP, which were later disseminated by their book Shooting to Live With the One-Hand Gun (1942), along with various other police innovations such as riot batons, armoured vests, and other equipment.

He is perhaps known best for designing the famous Fairbairn–Sykes fighting knife, or 'Commando' knife, a stiletto-style fighting dagger used by British special forces in the Second World War, and featured in his textbook Scientific Self-Defence. Fairbairn also designed the lesser known smatchet, and collaborated on the design of several other combat knife designs.

== Publications ==
- Defendu, first published in 1926 in Shanghai by the North China Daily News & Herald Ltd. Size 7" × 10", hardcover, cloth bound with 171 pages. Reprinted by Naval and Military Press, ISBN 9781783314973.
- Scientific Self-Defence, first published in 1931 by D. Appleton and Company (New York & London). Size 6 1/2" × 9 1/2", in hardcover with 165 pages. A slightly modified/updated version of Defendu. Reprinted by Naval and Military Press, ISBN 9781783314966.
- All-In Fighting, first published in 1942 by Faber and Faber Limited (London). Size 5 1/2" × 8 1/4" in hardcover with 132 pages. Reprinted by Naval and Military Press, ISBN 9781783313419.
- Get Tough, first published in 1942 by D. Appleton-Century Company (New York & London). Size 5 1/2" × 7 3/4" in softcover with 121 pages. This is a modified version of All-In Fighting for the American market. Note the first edition has Fairbairn's rank as 'Captain' and all subsequent (1940s) editions as 'Major'. Reprinted by Naval and Military Press, ISBN 9781783313334.
- Self Defence for Women and Girls, first published in 1942 by Faber and Faber (London). Size 5 1/2" × 8" softcover with 48 pages.
- Hands Off!: Self-Defense for Women, first published in 1942 by D. Appleton-Century Company (New York & London). Size 5 1/4" × 8" in softcover with 41 pages. This is a modified version of Self Defence for Women and Girls for the American market. Reprinted by Naval and Military Press, ISBN 9781783313532.
- Shooting To Live, co-authored by Eric Anthony Sykes, first published in 1942 by Oliver and Boyd (London). Size 4 1/4" × 7" in hardcover with 96 pages. ISBN 0-87364-027-6 (reprint). Reprinted by Naval and Military Press, ISBN 9781783313402.
- WE Fairbairn's Complete Compendium of Lethal, Unarmed, Hand-to-Hand Combat Methods and Fighting. All six of WE Fairbairn's works in one binding to create the ultimate compendium: Get Tough, All-In Fighting, Shooting to Live, Scientific Self-Defence, Hands Off!, Defendu. Naval and Military Press, 2020, ISBN 9781783317042.

== See also ==
- Close-quarters battle
- Combatives
- Camp X
- Applegate–Fairbairn fighting knife
- All-In Fighting

== Sources ==
- Giles Milton The Ministry of Ungentlemanly Warfare, 2016, John Murray. ISBN 978-1-444-79895-1
- The Legend of W. E. Fairbairn, Gentleman and Warrior: The Shanghai Years by Peter Robins, edited by Paul Child. 2005. ISBN 0-9549494-0-4. First biography on Fairbairn.
- The First Commando Knives by Kelly Yeaton, Samuel S. Yeaton, and Rex Applegate. Phillips Publications, 1996. ISBN 0-93257-225-1
- Empire Made Me: An Englishman Adrift in Shanghai by Robert Bickers. 2003. ISBN 0-231-13132-1, ISBN 0-14-101195-5. Life and times of a member of the Shanghai Municipal Police.
- Contemporary Knife Targeting - Modern Science vs. W. E. Fairbairn's Timetable of Death by Christopher Grosz and Michael D. Janich - a thorough analysis of Fairbairn's work on human anatomy and knife fighting.
- The Shanghai Fighting Knives, and many fakes!!!! (2010) by O. Janson. Summary of the Shanghai Fighting Knife and its evolution into the Fairbairn–Sykes fighting knife.
