= Deer catcher (weapon) =

Type of dagger

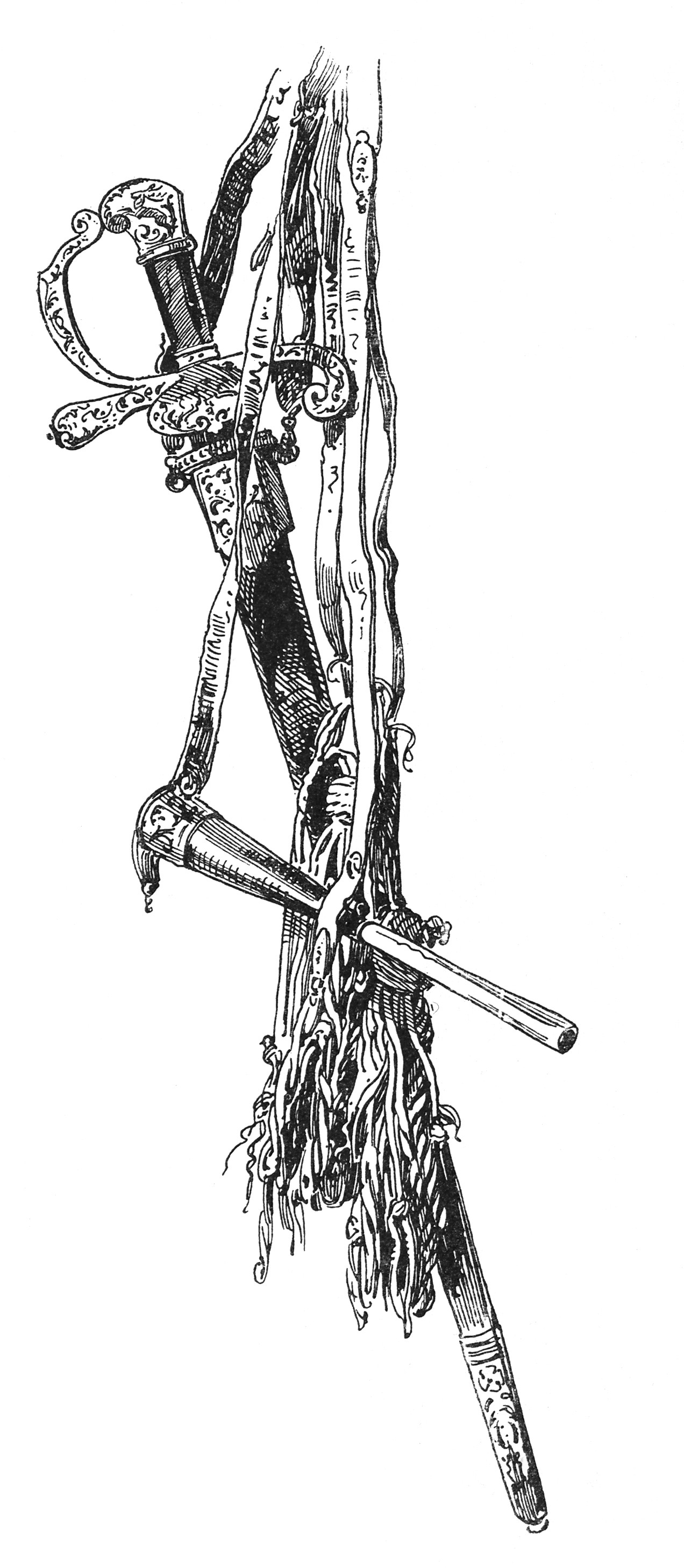
Hunting dagger

The hunting dagger (German: Hirschfänger, "deer catcher") is an 18–30-inch (460–760 mm) long German dagger, used to kill deer and boar. It is a weapon mainly used in the fancy hunts of the German nobility. This dagger developed from medieval hunting swords which were longer and mainly used by mounted hunters. Today hunting daggers are occasionally used as parts of traditional German hunting uniforms.
