= Fairbairn–Sykes fighting knife =

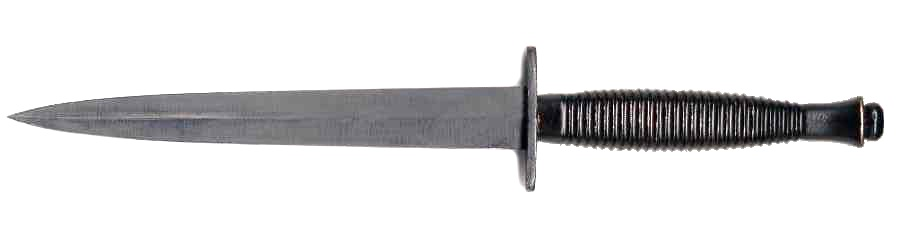
- F-S fighting knife – ring grip pattern
- Type: Dagger
- Place of origin: United Kingdom

Service history
- In service: 1941–present
- Used by: See § Users
- Wars: World War II – present

Production history
- Designer: William Ewart Fairbairn and Eric Anthony Sykes
- Designed: 1941
- Manufacturer: Wilkinson Sword
- Produced: 1941

Specifications
- Length: 11.5 inches (29 cm)
- Blade length: 7 inches (18 cm)
- Blade type: Dagger
- Hilt type: Metal
- Scabbard/sheath: Metal
- Head type: Metal
- Haft type: Metal

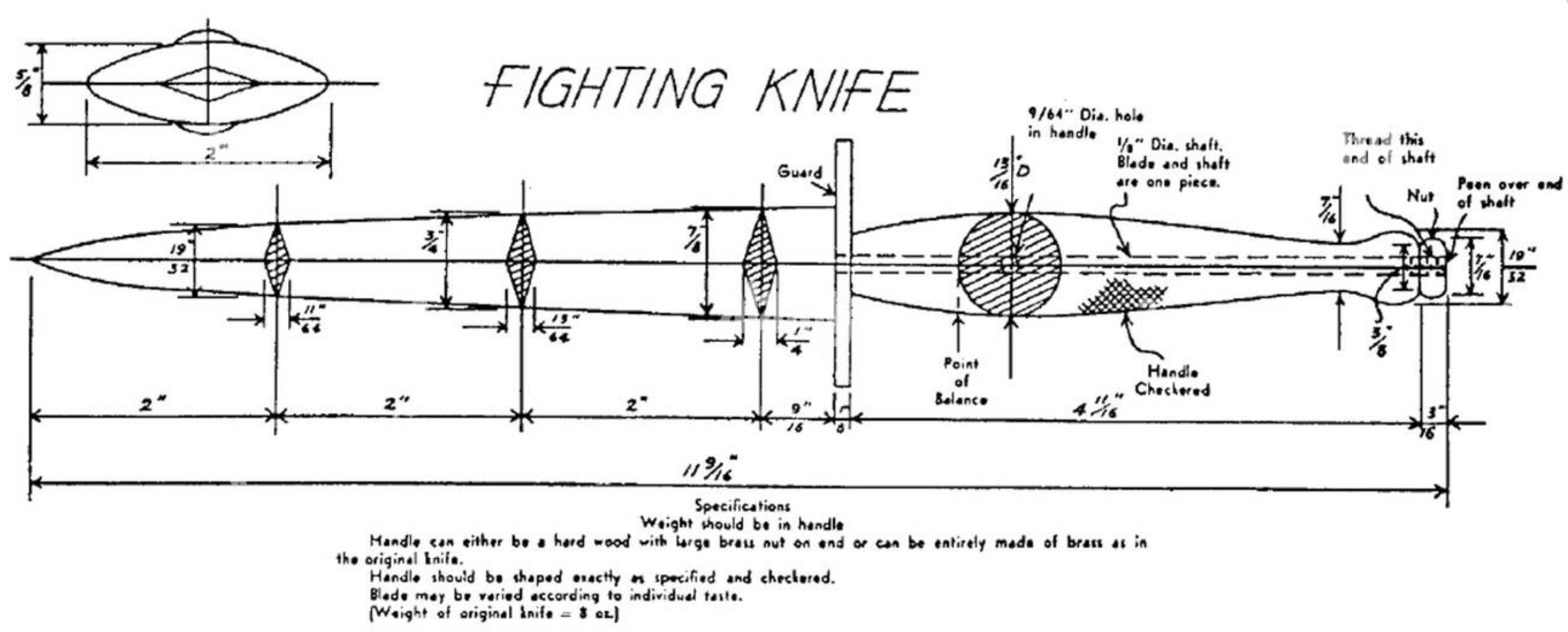
F-S fighting knife diagram from FMFRP 12-80, Kill or Get Killed, by Rex Applegate, who worked with Fairbairn

The Fairbairn–Sykes fighting knife is a double-edged fighting knife resembling a dagger or poignard with a brass or wooden foil grip. It was developed by William Ewart Fairbairn and Eric Anthony Sykes in Shanghai based on ideas that the two men had while serving on the Shanghai Municipal Police in China before World War II.

The F-S fighting knife was made famous during World War II when issued to British Commandos, the Airborne Forces, the Special Air Service (SAS) and many other units, especially for the Normandy landings in June 1944. With its acutely tapered, sharply pointed blade, the F-S fighting knife is frequently described as a stiletto, a weapon optimised for thrusting, although the F-S knife can be used to inflict slash cuts upon an opponent when its cutting edges are sharpened according to specification. The Wilkinson Sword Company made the knife with minor pommel and grip design variations.

== History ==
The first batch of 50 F-S fighting knives was produced in January 1941 by Wilkinson Sword Ltd. Fairbairn and Sykes had travelled to their factory from the Special Training Centre at Lochailort in November 1940 to discuss their ideas for a fighting knife.

A batch of 1,500 knives of this first pattern was ordered in Nov 1940. An order for 38,000 of the second pattern (slightly revised for wartime exigencies) followed in 1941.

By the time of the third pattern of design refinements (dating from October 1943) the knife was being produced by several manufacturers. No formal specification existed until after the war, but the 1949 UK government specification E/1323E remains current.

In December 2019, an SBS commando in Afghanistan used an F-S knife during an ambush by ISIL fighters.

== Design ==
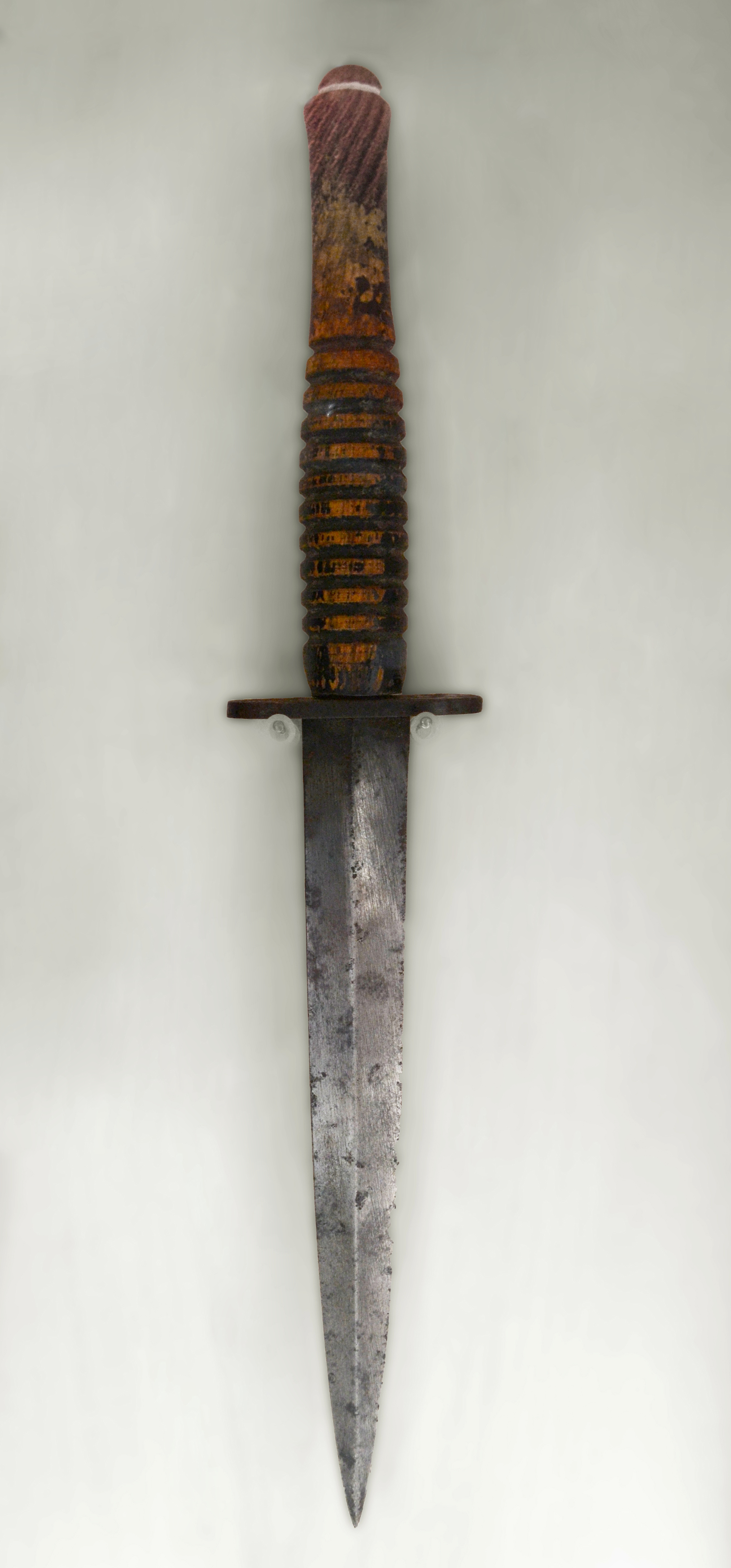
Fairbairn–Sykes fighting knife at Fort William Museum

The F-S fighting knife was designed for surprise attack and fighting, with a slender blade that can easily penetrate a ribcage. the grip is provided by a vase-shaped handle, and the blade's slender, sharp-pointed blade is designed for use as a fighting knife. Fairbairn's rationale is in his book Get Tough! (1942):

In close-quarters fighting there is no more deadly weapon than the knife. In choosing a knife there are two important factors to bear in mind: balance and keenness. The hilt should fit easily in your hand, and the blade should not be so heavy that it tends to drag the hilt from your fingers in a loose grip. It is essential that the blade have a sharp stabbing point and good cutting edges, because an artery torn through (as against a clean cut) tends to contract and stop the bleeding. If a main artery is cleanly severed, the wounded man will quickly lose consciousness and die.

The Fairbairn–Sykes was produced in several patterns. The Shanghai knife on which it was based was about 5.5 in (14 cm) long in the blade. First-pattern knives have a 6.5 in (17 cm) blade with a flat area, or ricasso, at the top of the blade under the S-shaped crossguard; this was not present on the original design and its presence has not been explained by the manufacturers. Second-pattern knives have a slightly longer blade (just less than 7 in (18 cm)), 2 in (5.1 cm)-wide oval crossguard, knurled pattern grip, and rounded ball, and may be stamped "ENGLAND" (a US legal requirement when importing the surplus knives after WWII) on the handle side of the cross guard. Some may also be stamped with a "broad arrow" British issue mark and a number (e.g., 21) on the opposite handle side of the cross guard. Third-pattern knives also have a similarly sized seven-inch blade, but the handle was redesigned to be a ringed grip. This ringed grip is reputed to have disappointed one of the original designers as it unbalanced the weapon and made harder to hold when wet, but it was used by the manufacturers as it was simple to produce and could be cast from a cheaper and more plentiful alloy instead of using up quantities of scarce brass stock. William Rodgers, as part of the Egginton Group, produce an all-black "sterile" version of the knife, devoid of any markings showing maker for NATO use.

The length of the blade was chosen to give several inches of blade to penetrate the body after passing through the 3 in (7.6 cm) of Soviet greatcoats, the thickest clothing expected to be worn in the war. Later production runs of the F-S fighting knife have a blade length that is about 7.5 in (19 cm).

In all cases the handle had a distinctive foil-like grip to enable a number of handling options. Many variations on the F-S fighting knife exist, in size of blade and particularly of handle. The design has influenced the design of knives throughout the period since its introduction.

== Variants ==
Because of the success of the Fairbairn–Sykes knife in World War II and in the wars in Korea and Vietnam, many companies made their own versions of the F-S fighting knife.

Almost two million of the British knives were made. Early production runs were extremely limited and demand was high, with many British troops attempting to buy their own.

=== OSS version ===
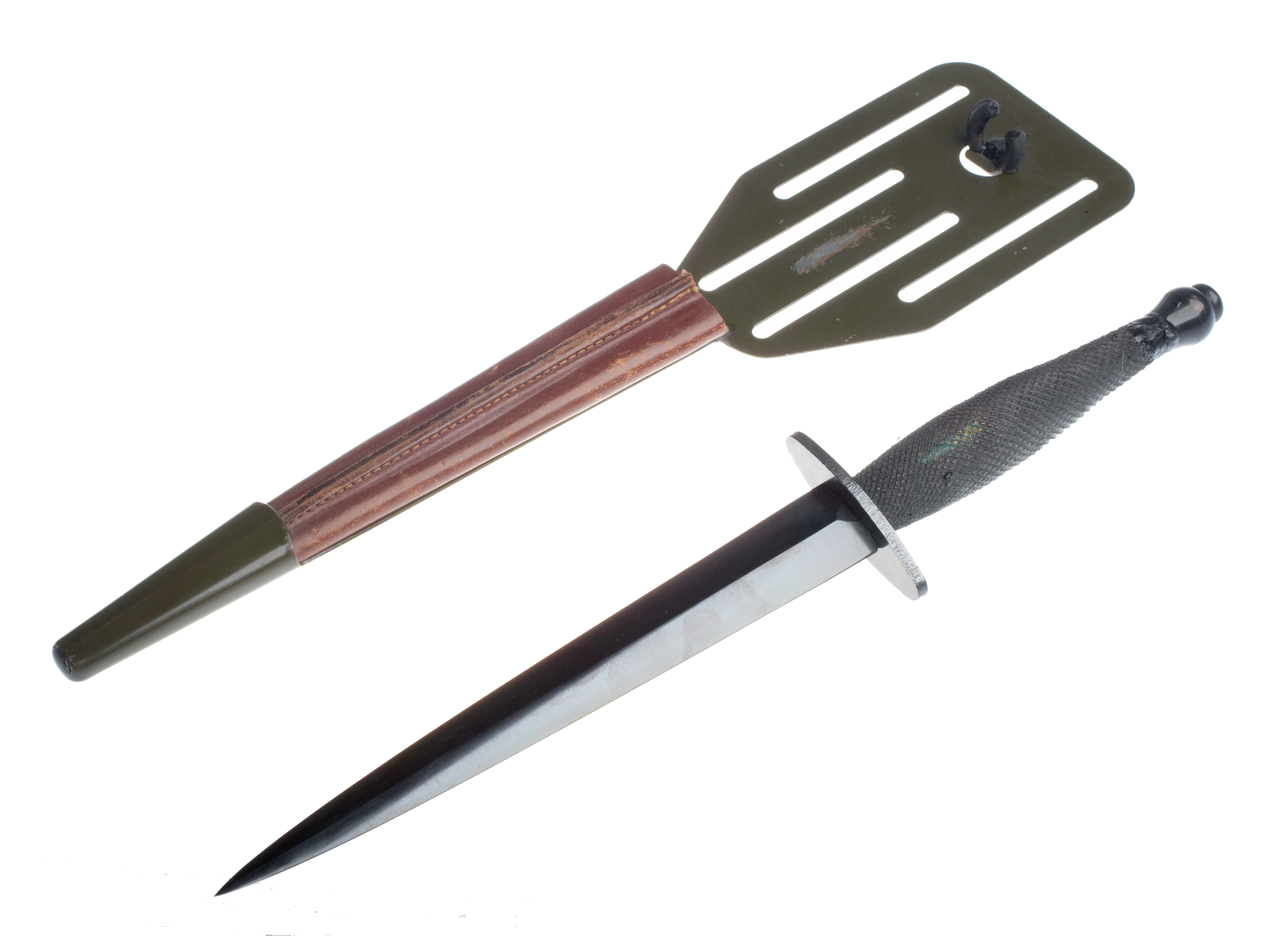
OSS knife and its distinctive scabbard (Collection of the CIA Museum)

The United States' Office of Strategic Services (OSS) stiletto was a double-edged knife based on the Fairbairn–Sykes fighting knife. It was so admired that the U.S. military created several other fighting knives based on it.

The OSS's knife manufacturing bid was approximately one-fifteenth of the British equivalent, but the U.S. version of the knife, manufactured by Landers, Frary & Clark, of New Britain, Connecticut, was improperly tempered and inferior to the British F-S fighting knife in materials and workmanship. Its reputation suffered accordingly.

A total of 20,000 units of the OSS version were produced. The OSS dagger was officially replaced in service in 1944 by the U.S. M3 trench knife.

The scabbard for the OSS stiletto looks like a pancake spatula, a design that can be worn high or low on the belt, or angled either left or right. In theory, this gave a very adaptable mounting system, but the metal belt attachment risked injury to those wearing it, especially parachutists during airborne operations.

=== V-42 stiletto ===
General Robert T. Frederick of the First Special Service Force ("Devil's Brigade") is credited with a similar weapon, the Fighting Commando Knife, Type V-42, better known as the V-42 stiletto, a derivation of the F-S design.

The V-42 was manufactured by W. R. Case & Sons Cutlery Co. in the U.S. c. 1942–1943 and is distinguished mainly by its markings and the presence of a small, scored indentation for the wielder's thumb, to aid in orienting the knife for thrusting.

=== Smatchet ===
Fairbairn has been given full or partial credit for the design of several other fighting knives, including the smatchet.

== Users ==
=== Current ===
- Indonesia — Kopassus
- Malaysia — Grup Gerak Khas
- Russia — Reportedly being used by Alpha Group.
- Singapore — Singapore Armed Forces Commandos
- Spain — FS knife clones made for Spanish airborne soldiers

=== Former ===
- Australia — Some used by Australian soldiers in the Vietnam War.
- Canada — Formerly used by First Special Service Force.
- France — Formerly used by French Resistance fighters.
- Ghana — 250 FS knives ordered between 1969 and 1979.
- Kenya — 500 FS knives ordered.
- Netherlands — 400 FS knives ordered in 1961.
- Nigeria — 300 FS knives ordered.
- Norway — 450 FS knives ordered in 1962.
- Poland — Used by 1 Brygada Spadochronowa (1st Independent Parachute Brigade), which was founded in exile alongside the British Army 1941–1947.
- United Kingdom — Formerly used by the SAS, the Special Service Brigade, the Chindits, SBS, and the Parachute Regiment (United Kingdom). The knife continues to be represented in the insignia of the UK Commando Force and, more recently, the Army Special Operations Brigade.
- United States — Some used during the Vietnam War by some United States Army Special Forces soldiers. Formerly used by United States Army Rangers, Marine Raiders, and the First Special Service Force.

== Cultural legacy ==
The F-S knife is strongly associated with the British commandos and the US Office of Strategic Services (OSS) and Marine Raiders (who based their issued knife on the Fairbairn–Sykes), among other special forces.

It features in the insignia of the British 3 Commando Brigade, the Belgian Commandos, the Dutch Commando Corps (founded in the UK during World War II), and of the Australian 1st Commando and 2nd Commando Regiments (all founded with the help of the British Commandos).

The knife continues to be represented in the insignia of the UK Commando Force and, more recently, the Army Special Operations Brigade.

Large numbers of Fairbairn Sykes knives of varying types, including some with wooden grips, were used by the 3rd Canadian Infantry Division that landed on Juno Beach on D-Day and by the men of the 1st Canadian Parachute Battalion. The V-42 is used in the insignia of units related to special operations, namely the Canadian Special Operations Forces Command, Canadian Special Operations Regiment, and the CAF Special Operations Forces Branch.

A solid gold F-S fighting knife is part of the commandos' memorial at Westminster Abbey.

== See also ==
- Applegate–Fairbairn fighting knife
- BC-41
- Pattern 1907 bayonet
- V-42 stiletto
- M9 bayonet
- Glock knife
- 6KH2 bayonet
- 6KH3 bayonet
- 6KH4 bayonet
