= Böker =

German knife company

- Type: Corporation
- Industry: Manufacturing
- Founded: 1869; 157 years ago
- Headquarters: Solingen, Germany,
- Products: Knives
- Revenue: US$30 million
- Number of employees: 140
- Website: Böker Knives

Böker (German pronunciation: [ˈbøːkɐ]) was one of the first companies to offer ceramic knives as a featured product line.

== History ==
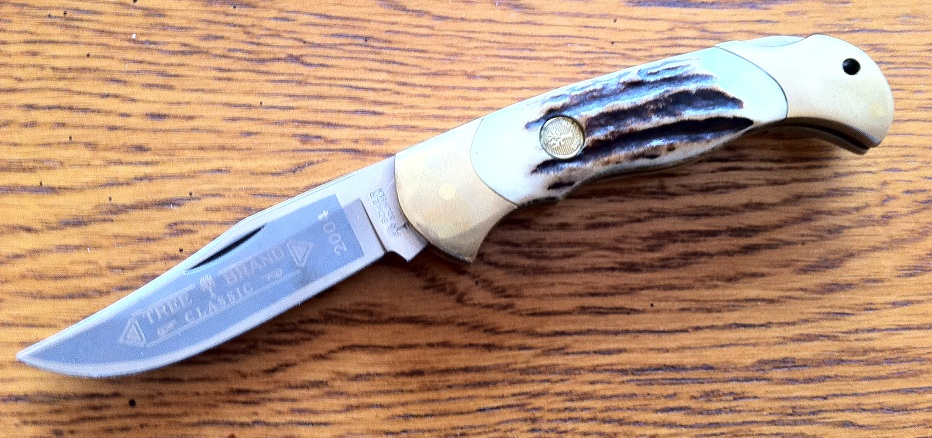
Böker knife

Böker traces its origin to the 17th century as a tool maker in Germany graduating to swords and blades by the 1800s. The company claims it was producing 2000 sabres a week by 1839 for use in various wars. By the 1860s the company had fractured with a branch of the family emigrating to North America and setting up plants in Canada, Mexico and The United States. The German and North American factories produced similar knives and used the "Tree Brand" trademark. This continued until World War II when the Solingen factory was destroyed and "Boker USA" took control of the trademark until the German factory was rebuilt in the 1950s. In the 1960s and 1970s the company changed hands several times, with the US facility (Hermann Boker & Co) shutting down in 1983. In 1986, Boker reacquired the rights to the American brand and Boker USA was started in Denver, Colorado for US production.

== Products ==
The production is mainly of knives for leisure, hunting and collection, as well as those for sports and professional use for military and police bodies. There is also a production section dedicated to professional kitchen knives and shaving products, including straight razors.

The production is divided under the brands:

- Böker Manufaktur Solingen is the brand offering handmade knives of the parent company Böker in Solingen, specialized in small series productions for collectors. Among the best known products there is the Speedlock switchblade and knives with damask blades, or unique pieces such as those made of steel obtained from the cannon of the Leopard tank or from the Tirpitz battleship.
- Böker Arbolito is the brand of handicraft products from the Buenos Aires factory.
- Böker Plus is the Böker brand for innovative and professional products conceived and developed in Solingen and manufactured overseas.
- Magnum by Böker is the brand for products conceived in Solingen and designed, developed and manufactured overseas.
