= Al Mar Knives =

American knife manufacturing company

- Type: Corporation
- Industry: Manufacturing
- Founded: Tualatin, Oregon; 1979; 47 years ago
- Headquarters: Tualatin, Oregon
- Key people: Al Mar, Founder; Gary Fadden, President
- Products: Knives
- Revenue: US$500,000
- Number of employees: 5
- Website: Al Mar Knives
- Footnotes; Blade Cutlery Hall of Fame

Al Mar Knives is a production knife company headquartered in Tualatin, Oregon, United States. The company was established in 1979 by Al Mar and has a reputation for making tactical knives of innovative design. While headquartered in the United States, Al Mar knives were made in Seki City of Japan from 1979 to 2019.

== Al Mar ==
Alfred Clark "Al" Mar was born in the US and was the son of Chinese immigrants. Mar served in a Special Forces Reserve unit and in the late 1950s volunteered to serve in Vietnam with a special project using all-Asian Special Forces soldiers. The project was run in Okinawa where the 1st SFGA had a forward deployed battalion stationed and support assets. Mar was a non-commissioned officer and after serving in the Army, he earned a master's degree in industrial design from Art Center College of Design in Pasadena, California. His master's thesis was building and launching a working 2-man submarine. Upon graduating he went to work for an industrial design firm in Los Angeles in 1967.

Mar went on to become a packaging designer and eventually the head of knife design for Gerber Legendary Blades in 1968. Gerber's head designer had retired and Pete Gerber gave Mar the task of coming up with an aluminum handle for a kitchen knife. Gerber thought the project was very successful and offered Mar the position of design chief.

In 1979, Mar left Gerber to form his own company: Al Mar Knives. The knives were manufactured in Seki City, Japan in a 1000-year-old sword making city; nearly all by G.Sakai. Al Mar's relationship with them started in 1976/77 when he worked for Gerber and G.Sakai was awarded the contract to manufacture the "Gerber Silver Knight" folders. Over the years G.Sakai subcontracted a few Al Mar models that were made by Mitsuboshi, Tak Fujita, and Hattori due to G Sakai's inability to meet production volume requirements, as they were already the OEM maker for SOG, Spyderco and Cold Steel. However as they were all famous Seki knifemakers in their own right there was no effect on quality. Due to the long relationship between them, Al Mar had a close relationship with Yuhei Sakai, the current Chairman of G Sakai.

Al Mar died in 1992 from an aneurysm. The color guard provided for his memorial service was drawn from the reserve Special Forces company then stationed at the Portland Air National Guard base. Mar had supported the unit for some time and was an honorary member of the company.

The company was taken over by Gary Fadden who purchased a controlling interest after considerable conflict with Al Mar's widow, Ann, who died in 2017. Unhappy that G.Sakai had the right under the original contract signed by Al Mar that allowed G Sakai to manufacture and market knives under the Al Mar label for the non-U.S.market he switched manufacturing to Moki, also of Seki. Quality of the now renamed "Fadden Al Mar" knives did not suffer as Moki was also a highly regarded Seki knifemaker. In the late 1980s Mar was inducted into the Fighting Knives Magazine Hall of Fame. Then in 2009, he was inducted in the Blade Magazine Cutlery Hall of Fame.

Mar was a close friend of Colonel James "Nick" Rowe and other well known and respected Special Forces ("Green Berets") luminaries. He was a Life member of the Special Forces Association as well as the Special Operations Association.

In early 2019, it was announced that Al Mar Knives had been sold to a Maryland USA company Edge Technologies Engineering LLC with Fadden remaining on the Board. The new knife models that have been made public have been several old established AL MAR designs, however with manufacture in Mainland China using Chinese steels.

== Company history ==
With the founding of Al Mar Knives, Mar aimed to blend custom knife quality with mass production methods. Drawing on his experiences as martial artist with black belt rankings in judo and kendo, and his history as a Green Beret, the majority of Al Mar Knives were initially designed for police and military use. However, as the company evolved the designs merged from martial to hunting, fishing, and kitchen knives.

The Al Mar SERE knife was the first knife accepted for use by Special Forces Colonel Nick Rowe for the SERE Instructor School at Camp McCall, North Carolina. The SERE was the first factory-made production knife to sell for more than US$100 in the United States.

== Collaborations ==
Al Mar Knives has collaborated with a number of knife makers, martial artists, and military tacticians including Rex Applegate, Nick Rowe, Bob Taylor, Bill Harsey, Jr., and ABS Mastersmith Kirk Rexroat.

== See also ==
- List of companies based in Oregon
