= Types of daggers =

The following is a list of notable daggers, either historical or modern. A dagger is a short, pointed knife, historically popular as a weapon. Their names are often associated with their appearance or with a specific style of fighting.

== Ancient daggers ==
- Acinaces
- Bronze Age dagger
- Parazonium
- Pugio
- Sica

== European tradition ==
High Middle Ages

- Knightly dagger

Late Middle Ages

- Anelace (14th century long English dagger, worn as an accoutrement)
- Baselard (14th century long cutting dagger)
- Bollock dagger, rondel dagger, ear dagger (thrust oriented, by hilt shape)
- Poignard

Renaissance

- Cinquedea (broad short sword)
- Misericorde
- Stiletto (late 15th century)

Modern

- Bebut (Caucasus and Russia)
- Dirk (Scotland)
- Hunting dagger (Germany, 18th-century)
- Parrying dagger (17th- to 18th-century rapier fencing)
- Sgian-dubh (Scotland)
- Trench knife (WWI)
- Fairbairn–Sykes fighting knife (Britain, WWII)
- Push dagger

== Asian tradition ==
- Badik
- Balarao
- Balisong (Filipino)
- Bichuwa (Indian)
- Hachiwara
- Haladie (Indian)
- Jamdhar Katari (Afghanistan)
- Jambiya (Yemen)
- Kaiken
- Kalis
- Karambit
- Kard (Persian)
- Katar
- Khanjali
- Khanjar (Oman)
- Kila
- Kirpan
- Kris
- Kujang
- Kukri
- Maduvu
- Malappuram Kathi
- Pesh kabz (Afghan)
- Piha kaetta
- Punyal
- Qama
- Sai
- Shuckra
- Tantō
- Yoroi doshi

== African tradition ==
- Jile
- Billao (Somali)
- Seme
- Mambele
- Koummya (Morocco)

== American tradition ==
Military issue or commercial designs, 1918 to present.

- BC-41 (WWII)
- Cuchillo De Paracaidista (Argentine Paratroopers)
- Arkansas toothpick (19th-century US)
- Facón (Argentina, Brazil, Uruguay)
- Corvo (19th-century Chile)
- Gerber Mark II (1967)
- Push dagger
- Mark I trench knife (WWI)
- M3 trench knife (WWII)
- United States Marine Raider stiletto (WWII)
- V-42 stiletto (WWII)
- Applegate–Fairbairn fighting knife (WWII)
- M4 bayonet (WWII)
- "Yank" Levy fighting knife
- SOG Knife (Vietnam War era)
- M7 bayonet (Vietnam War era)

== See also ==
- Types of swords
