= Ear dagger =

Type of dagger

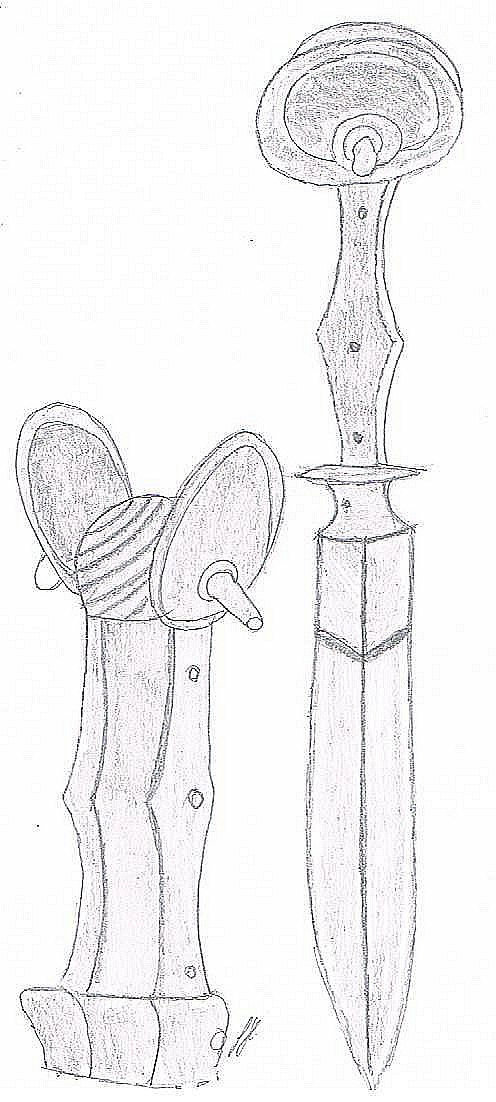
Drawing of an ear dagger

== Background ==
The ear dagger is a rare dagger with many styles: Nasrid, European, and Mughal-Indian. Although there are different styles, the ear dagger consists of a blade and a handle with two ear-like discs at the end. It includes engravings such as hunting, floral motifs, inscriptions, and shapes.The most common use of the ear dagger is for stabbing, as the handle enables stability and control, and allows it to be stealthily hidden in the belt.

== The Nasrid Style ==
The Nasrid Dynasty took place in Granada and is believed to be the oldest style. This style appeared around the 14th century and consists of a handle and a blade. Named after it, the handle features two human-ear-like discs on the sides of the blade's end. An ear dagger from Andalusia, when it was under the Nasrid rule, was covered in gold and inlaid with ivory with an ivory cross. Another dagger from Boʿabdil, the last king of the Nasrid Dynasty, had an iron cross at the top with a motif-decorated handle. There was also a stand, which was decorated with hunting scenes of a man chasing animals, and was also decorated with a floral background. The Nasrid style was influenced by Arabian cultures. The Nasrid style was decorated with Arabesque designs like wavy branches with leaves and flowers, hunting scenes, and Arabic inscriptions. Through wars and the fall of Granada in 1492, the ear dagger was able to move to Spain. During the 16th and 17th centuries, Moriscos helped link Islamic and European art as well.

== The European Style ==
During Spain's recovery, mercenary soldiers brought ear daggers to Spain. In Europe, some of these daggers were owned by Francis, king of France, and Henry VIII king of England. Like the Nasrid style, the European style consists of a handle and blade with two circular ear-like discs at the end of the handle. An ear dagger from Spain had hunting scenes and floral background engravings inlaid with gold, while another example had a blade inlaid with gold. An ear dagger from France from around the 16th century consists of a blade and human ear-like discs at the end of the handle, like the previous examples. Its handle was inlaid with ivory and gold and was also decorated with floral designs. During the late Middle Ages and the Renaissance, the ear dagger was known throughout Spain because of the communication and wars they had with Muslims in Andalusia. It is reported that Abu Abdullah, the last king of Granada, kept an ear dagger among his belongings. His dagger was decorated with plant motifs, European motifs, and Arabic inscriptions. The inscriptions were a mix of Arabic, Spanish, and Latin letters, and the statements had many mistakes. During the 16th century, the Ear Dagger appeared in paintings of European kings, princes, and nobles as a part of their official costumes. An example is in oil painting portraits of King Charles V by Jakob in 1530, and Edward VI of Wales when he was a young boy by Master John. They wore clothes with rich patterns and trimmings with an extensive use of jewelry while holding an ear dagger. In European culture, the ear dagger was merely a piece in the costumes of kings, princes, and noblemen.

== The Mughal Style ==
The Mughal-Indian style, although taking after its name, differs from the European and Nasrid style. This style also consists of a blade and handle, but unlike the European and Nasrid forms, the Mughal style has two formed flattened discs without external rings. Before the Mughal era, this style was unknown and was a result of European influences. Similar to Europe, Indian paintings depict the ear dagger being worn as a part of costumes. In a painting of Akbar and Jahangir, they wore their ear dagger secured to the side and middle of their belt. Mughal's influence culturally was how important weapon manufacturing was during the Indian Mughal period The handle of the Mughal-style dagger was also inlaid with jade.

== Functionality ==
The three main uses for the ear dagger were stabbing, costumes, and hunting. The dagger was an individual weapon used for stabbing when used in direct combat. The dagger could be fixed in the shield and used when they dropped their shield. During the Mughal era in India, the dagger would commonly be used offensively and be hidden in an animal's legs, and because of its design, it could be easily used for stabbing. The ear dagger was also used as part of costumes, and to show off their social class because of the ivory, gold, and gemstone-covered handle. Europeans wore it with their costumes, and Indian-Mughal emperors wore it normally in the front of their belts. Ear daggers were also used to hunt animals such as pigs and rabbits. The daggers used mainly for fighting had wider, stronger, and sharper edges. When it was used for decorative purposes rather than fighting, the side rings became less wide for more stability when worn on the belt.

== Form ==
The ear dagger's shape improved its ability to stab because of the broad end, which enabled the thumb to get a better grip. When held discreetly, the user was able to kill stealthily and was put in belts during battle. The ear dagger was rather short, and normally ranged from around 31-37cm, making it great to hide in animals’ legs, in shields, or on belts. The handle helped improve control, while the long blade helped increase lethality when stabbing the enemy.

== Design ==
The four main designs on ear daggers were hunting and animal scenes, shapes, floral motifs, and inscriptions. The hunting and animal scenes appeared in the Granada and European styles. Pigs were the most common design and were in scenes where the hunter would chase and stab them. The hunting and animal scenes showed up on the handles and blades of ear daggers. Geometric shapes included stars from the art of the Nasrid reign and showed up in all three styles. The floral motifs were designed to be wavy and penetrated by leaves in flowers, and were usually set as backgrounds. Arabic inscriptions on ear daggers were sometimes illegible due to the lack of proficiency. The decorations on the dagger sometimes had direct relations with the function; for example, when there were scenes of hunting, the dagger's function would be used for hunting. The shapes and floral motifs, however, did not have particular functions.

== See also ==
- Baselard
- Bollock
- Dagger
- Dirk
- Rondel
- Stiletto
- List of daggers
