= Seme (dagger) =

Maasai hunting knife

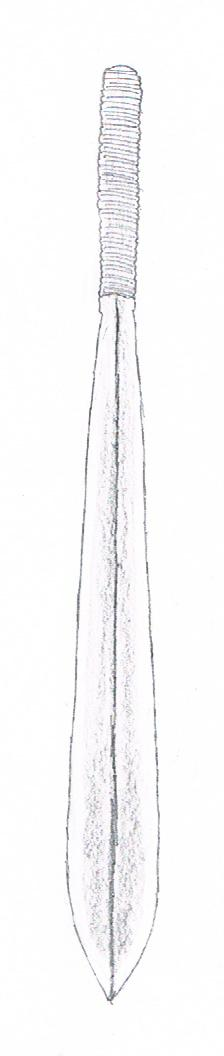
Sketch of a seme

A seme, simi or ol alem or Njora is a type of dagger or short sword used by the Maasai and Kikuyu peoples of Kenya in East Africa.

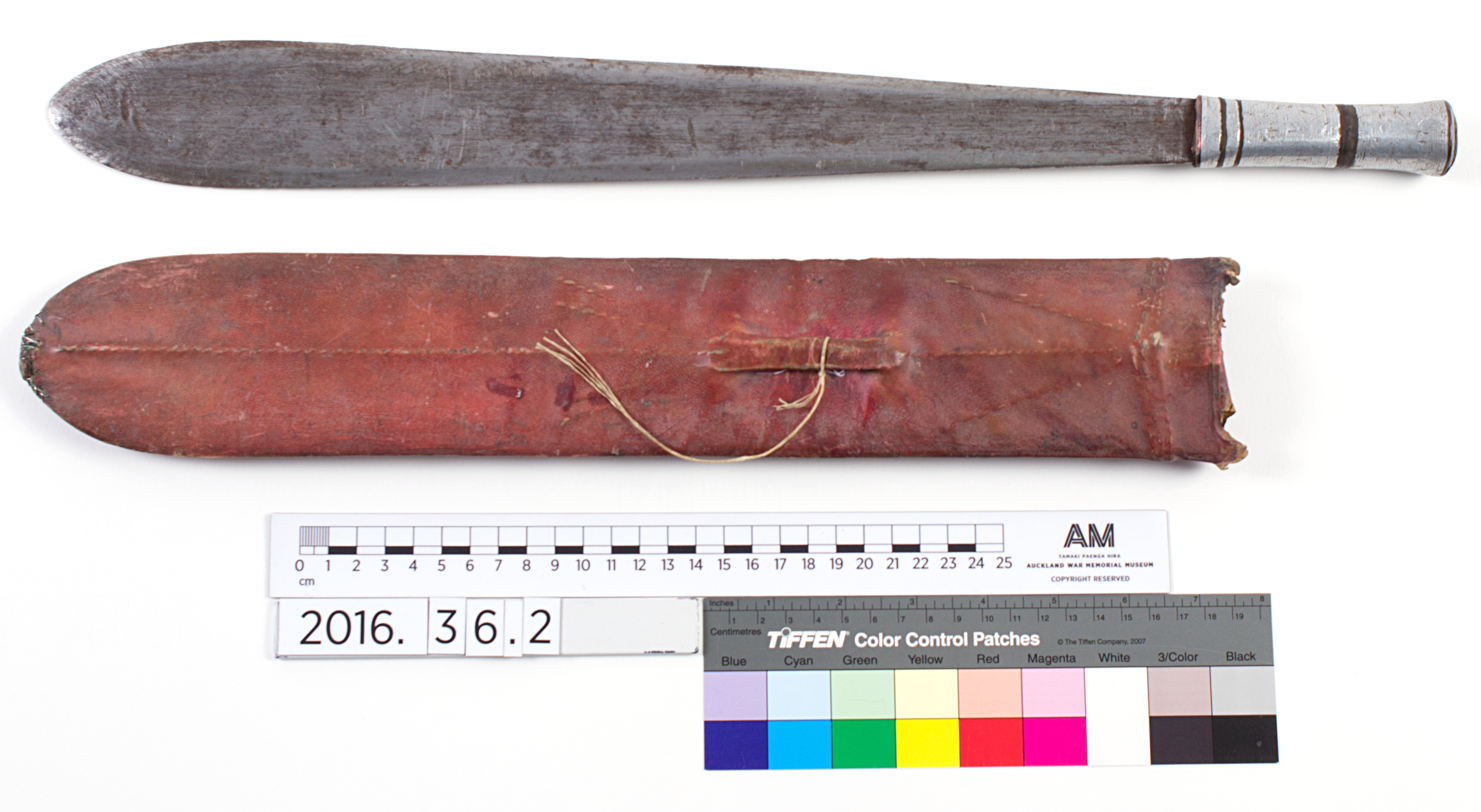
Maasai sword

They have a distinctive leaf-shaped blade, with a relatively rounded point. Scabbards are generally made of wood covered with rawhide, and dyed red.

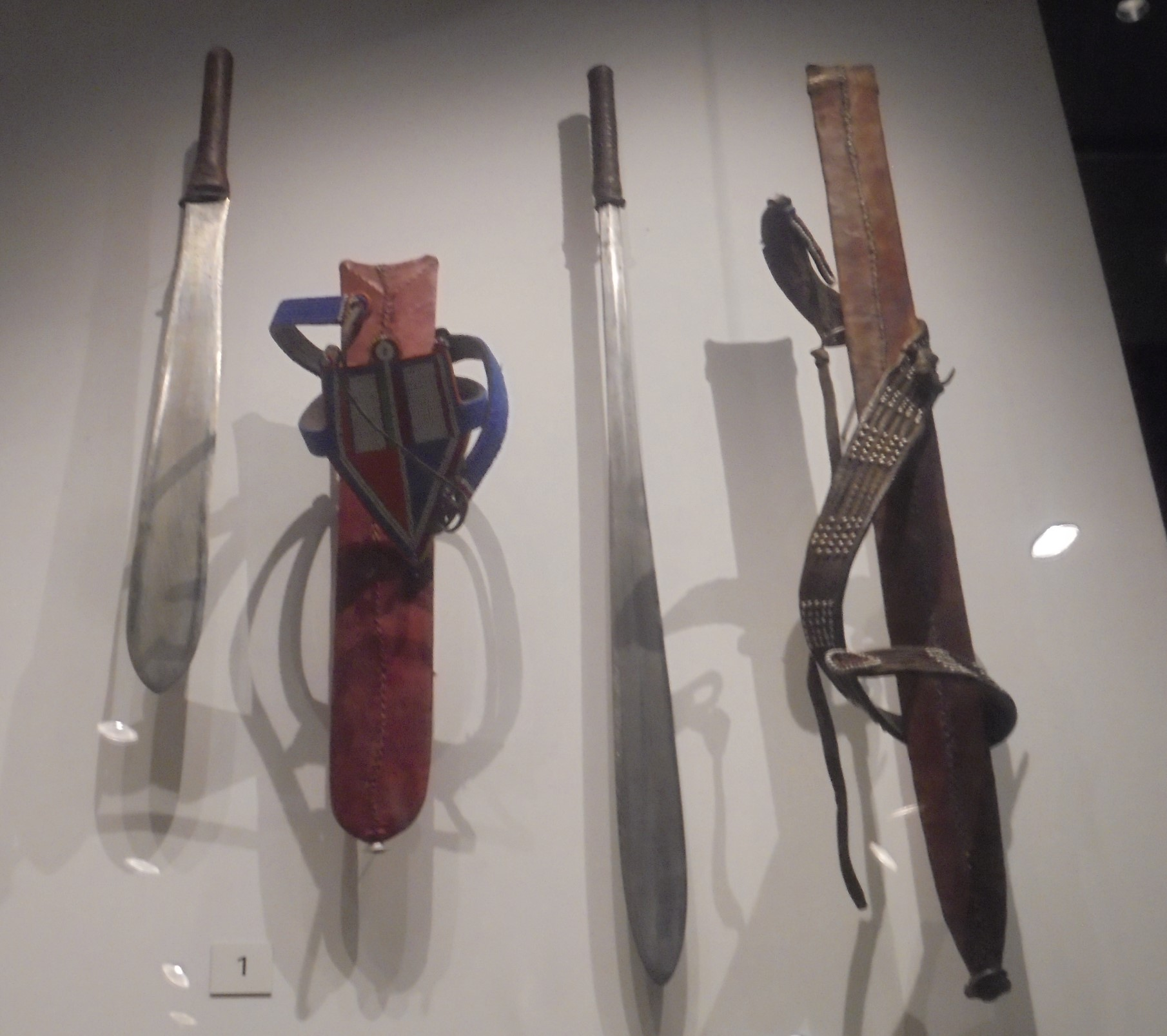
Maasai Seme

== See also ==
- List of daggers
