= Cinquedea =

Long dagger

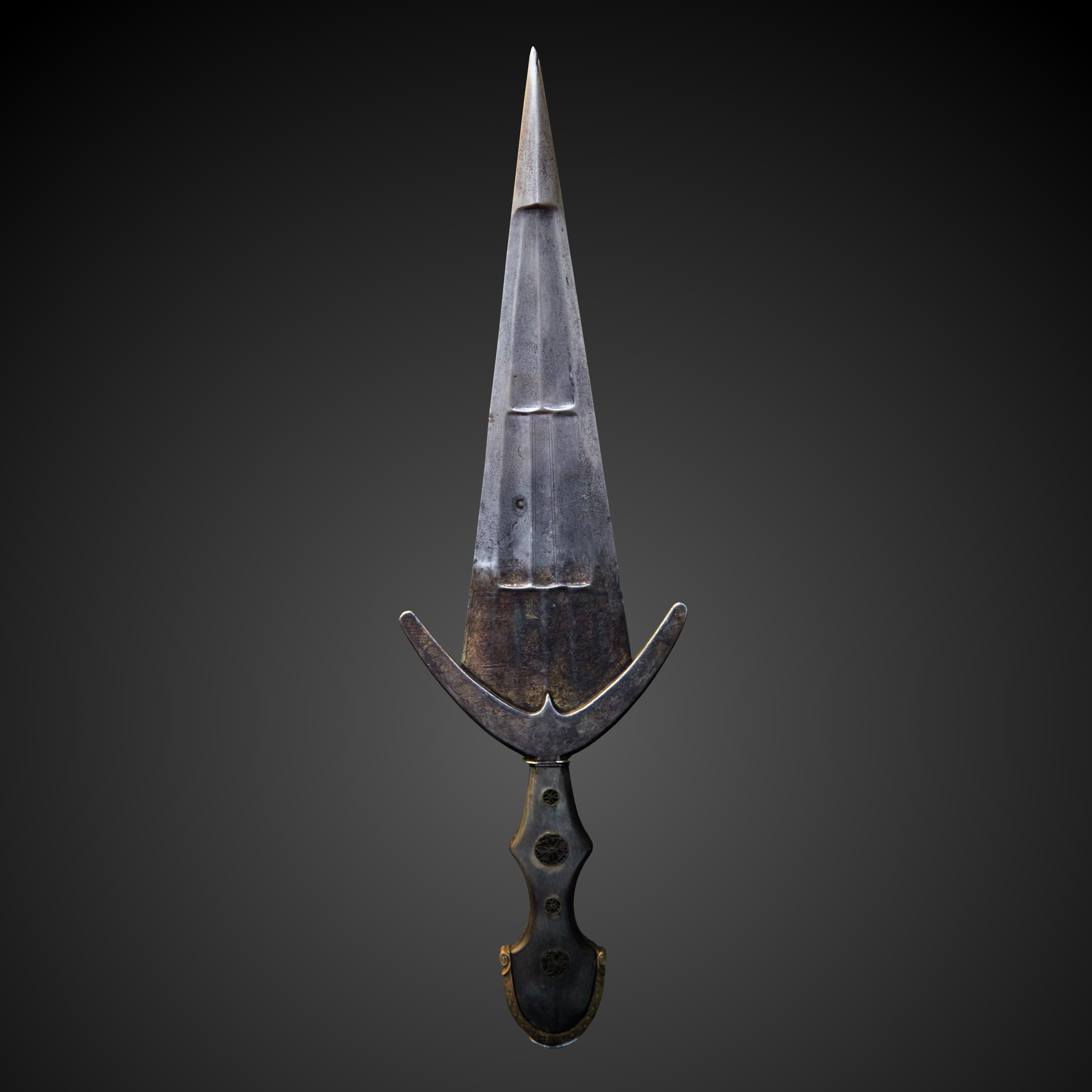
- Cinquedea on display at the Arts and History Museum of Geneva
- Type: Long dagger
- Place of origin: Italy

The cinquedea (/ˌtʃɪŋkwɪˈdi.ə/, /ˌtʃɪŋkwɪˈdeɪə/) or cinqueda is a civilian short sword (or long dagger). It was developed in northern Italy and enjoyed a period of popularity during the Italian Renaissance of the 15th and early 16th centuries.

The name cinquedea means "five fingers", and it describes the width of the blade next to the guard. The blade was heavy, about 45 cm (18 in) in length, and tapered to a somewhat rounded point. The grip was simple with a small pommel, and the guard was curved with the concave side toward the point. There were typically several fullers along the wider sides of the blade to lighten the weapon. The wide blade was useful for decorative etching. The wide blade was also used for attacking rather than the point of the blade. This weapon was varied in size, being anywhere from 10–28 in (250–710 mm) in length. It was often carried in place of a knife or larger sword. It is depicted in period art as sometimes being carried horizontally next to the buttocks so that it could be drawn laterally from the back. Unlike most other daggers, the cinqueda was able to deal cutting blows because of its size and shape.

== See also ==
- List of daggers
- Anelace
- Arkansas toothpick
