= Acinaces =

Type of Scythian short sword

Akinakes

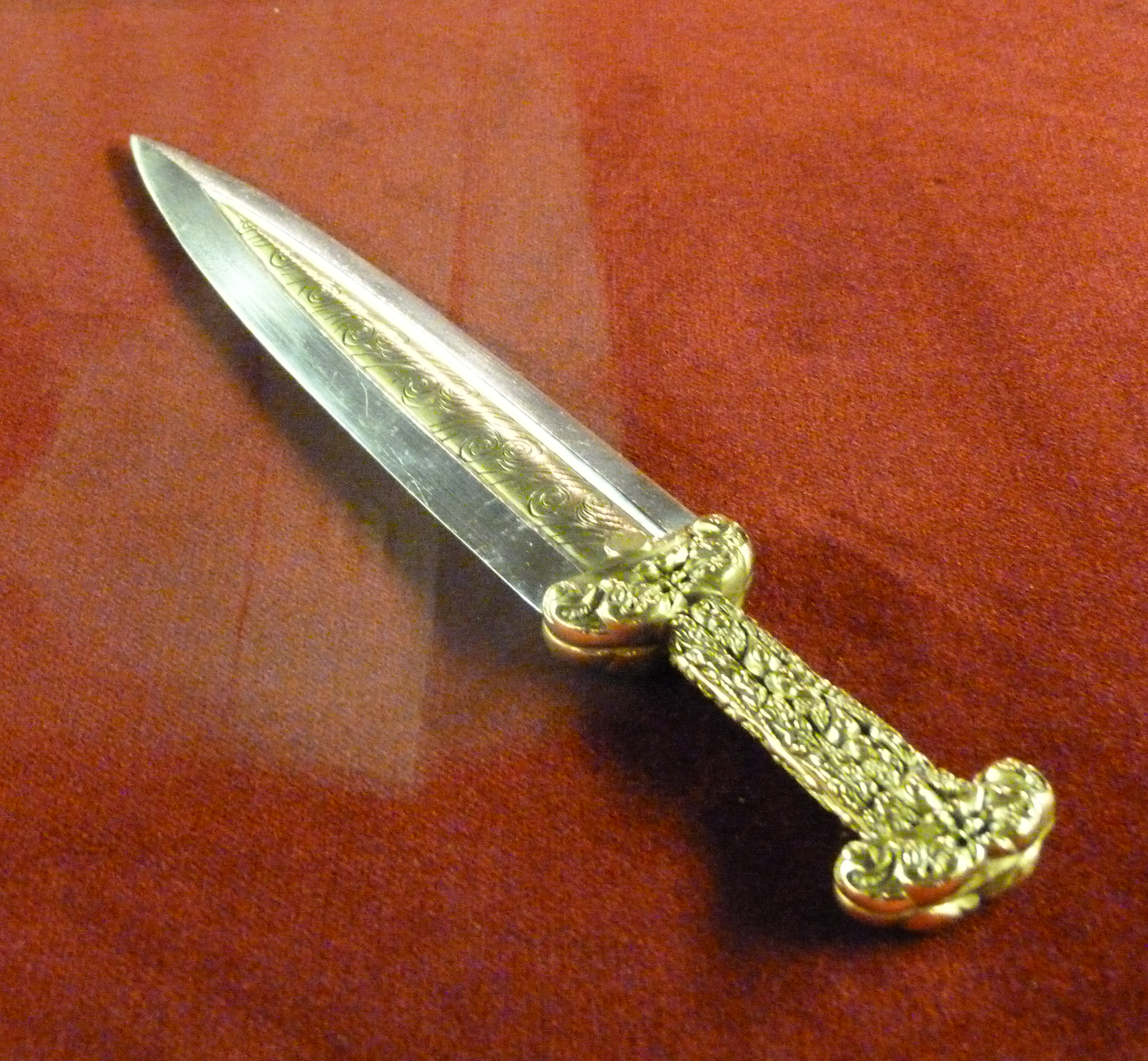
Akinakes dagger, burial mound of Arzhan (8-7th century BC), Tuva.

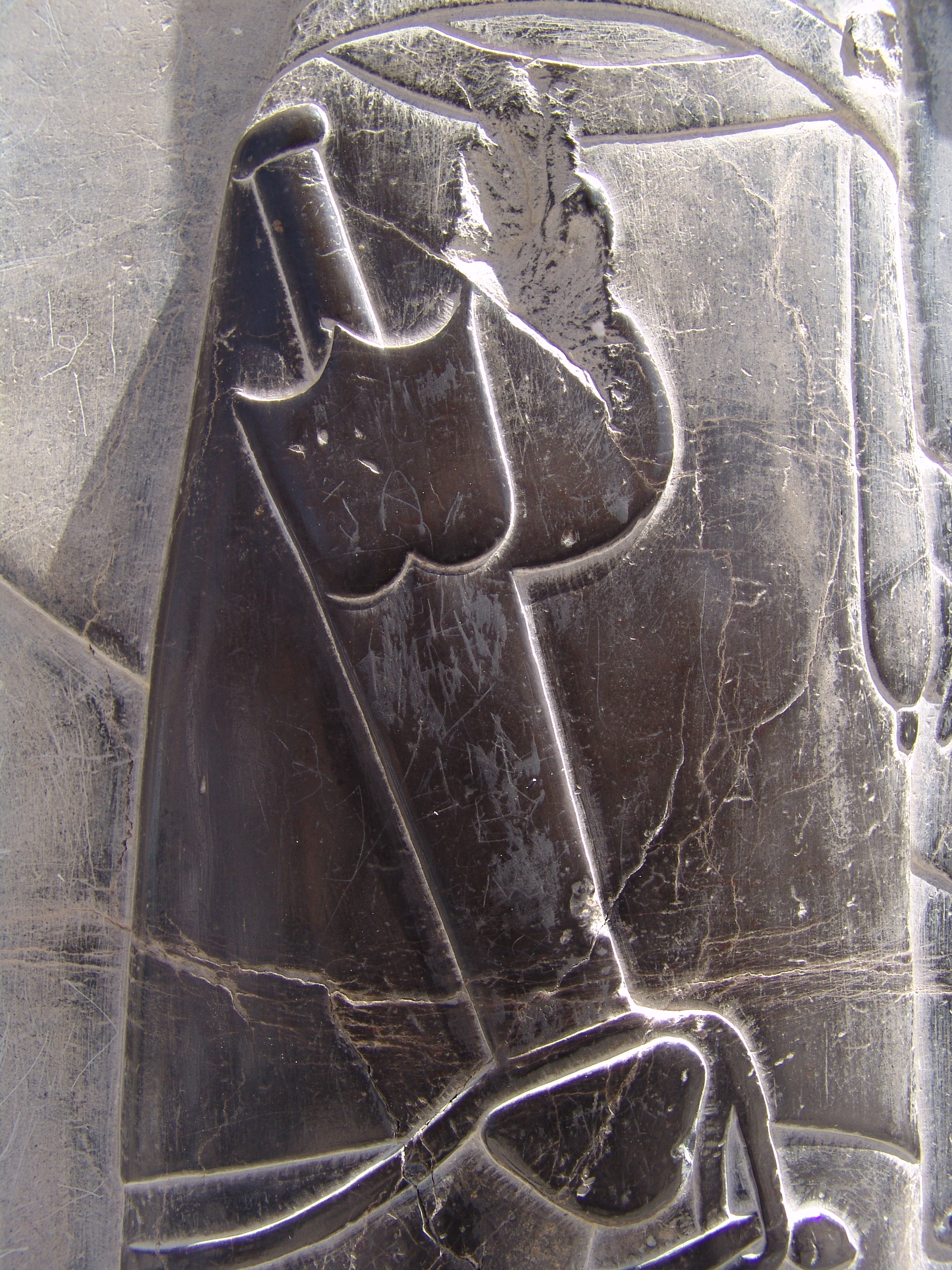
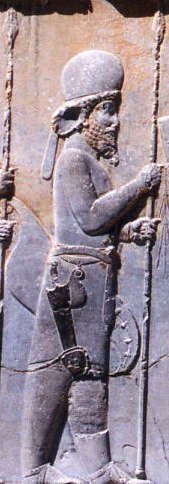
Akinakes in relief of a Median guard, Persepolis, 4th century BC

The acinaces, also transliterated as akinakes (Greek ἀκῑνάκης) or akinaka (unattested Old Persian *akīnaka^{h}, Sogdian kynʼk) is a type of dagger or xiphos (short sword) used mainly in the first millennium BCE in the eastern Mediterranean Basin, especially by the Medes, Scythians, Persians and Caspians, then by the Greeks.

The acinaces, of Scythian origin, but made famous by the Persians, rapidly spread throughout the ancient world. The Romans believed that this weapon originated with the Medes.

The acinaces is typically 40–60 cm (16–24 in) in length and double-edged, and although there is no universal design, the guard may be lobed with the hilt resembling that of a bollock dagger, or the pommel may be split or of the "antenna" type. The scabbard – as much as anything else – defines the acinaces, and usually has a large decorative mount near the opening, allowing it to be suspended from a belt on the wearer's right side.

== Identification ==
Ancient texts give few details of the acinaces, other than that characterising it as a type of "Persian sword". Because of this, authors writing in Latin throughout history tended to equate the word with whatever type of weapon the contemporary Persians were using. Thus, it is frequently used in medieval Latin texts to refer to a scimitar or the like, a meaning it still retains in scientific Latin. Paulus Hector Mair even goes so far as to translate dussack as acinaces, because it is curved like a scimitar, and likewise in the works of Jesuit authors describing Japan, acinaces is used for katana.

However, the Persian curved shamshir is a relatively recent weapon: it developed in medieval times and did not exist in Persia in antiquity. In the period of their main interactions with the Greeks, the Persians of the Achaemenid Empire (550 BCE to 330 BCE) made use of more than one kind of sword. Ancient Persian art typically shows the king's bodyguards and important nobles wearing ornate diagonal daggers. Greek art, on the other hand, frequently shows Persian soldiers using a kopis-like sword. One must therefore do some research to figure out which type is the acinaces.

One useful piece of evidence is that Greek and Roman texts sometimes mention the acinaces being given out by the king as a sign of favor. This would tend to suggest the identification of the acinaces as a dagger.

Herodotus mentions a ritual use of acinaces, offered as a gift to the sea by the Persian king Xerxes (History, VII, 54), in the ritual contrition scene following the episode known as Flagellation of Hellespont.

Josephus, writing c. 94 CE, describes in Jewish Antiquities, 20.186 the weapons used by the sicarii:

And the so-called sicarii, which were a type of bandit, were at that time reaching their greatest number, making use of small swords, which were like the Persian acinaces in respect to their size, but curved like the Roman sica, which is where these bandits got their name.

This seems to indicate that it is the dagger which is properly called the acinaces, but some deny this, translating the above passage as "concave like the Roman sica".

== Gallery ==
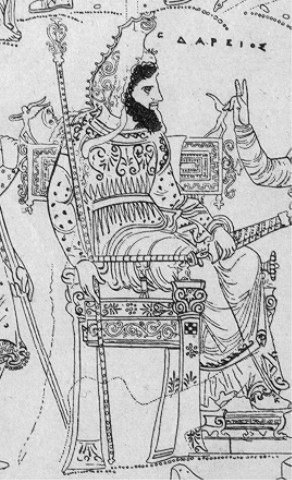
Darius the Great holding an acinaces in his lap

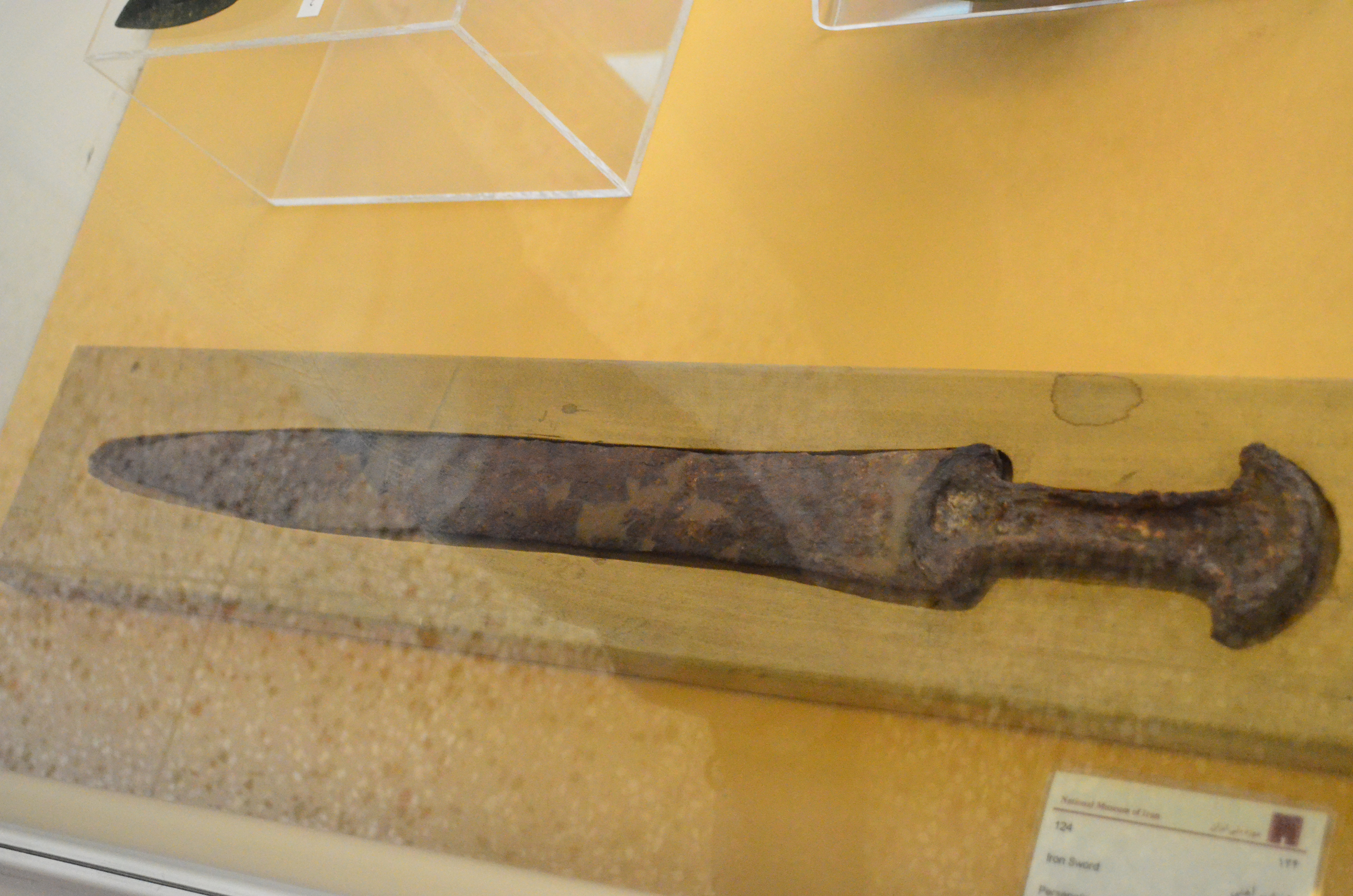
Acinaces, National Museum of Iran

An iron-made Scythian acinaces

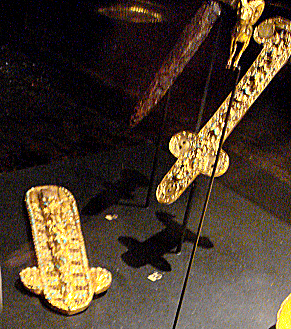
Golden akinakes, Tillya Tepe, 1st century AD

== See also ==
- List of daggers
- Shamshir
- Parazonium
