= Koummya =

Koummya كمية
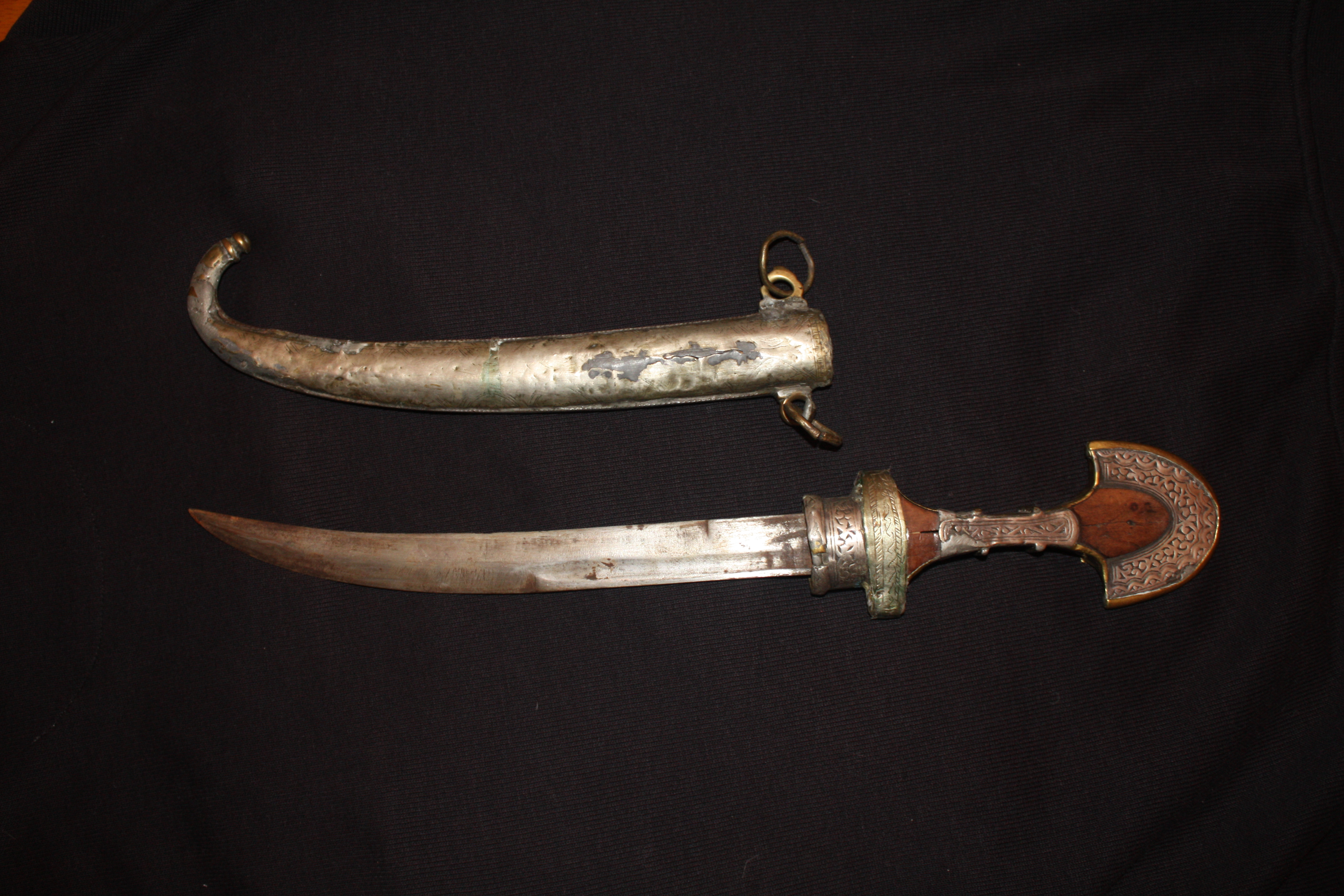
- A Koummya
- Type: Dagger
- Place of origin: Morocco

Service history
- In service: Chleuh Moroccan Goumier (professional use)
- Used by: Amazigh
- Wars: France: World War 1; World War 2

Specifications
- Mass: about 30 cm
- Length: about 40 cm
- Blade length: about 25 cm
- Blade type: Double-edged, slightly curved blade .
- Hilt type: Shovel shape with decorations
- Scabbard/sheath: Varies; usually metal

The Koummya, (also Khoumija or Koumaya; Arabic: كمية) is a dagger from Morocco. It is mainly used by Moroccan Berbers in the south of Morocco.

== Description ==
The Koummya has a double-edged, slightly curved blade. The edge on the inwardly curved side of the blade begins after a short ricasso. The edge on the outward-curving side of the blade is shorter and begins about halfway down. Many of the blades are of European origin. The pommel has the characteristic shape of a peacock's tail. The scabbard has projections on both sides with attachment options for the thin hanging strap.

As in many other areas of the Arab world, the dagger is part of the traditional male costume. The Koummya is worn on the hanging strap, which runs like a bandolier from the shoulder diagonally across the upper body, on the left hip.

The shape of the Koummya resembles a boar's tusk and is supposed to protect against the evil eye.

It may be related to the Italian ear dagger from the late Middle Ages, as there are certain similarities in the pommel. In contrast, the dagger Genoui, which is also found in Morocco, has a straight blade.

== Literature ==
- Christopher Spring: African arms and armor. Publisher Smithsonian Institution Press, 1993, ISBN 978-1-56098-317-0
