= Jamdhar Katari =

The Jamdhar-Katari is the traditional dagger of the Hindu Kush strains in Afghanistan.

== History ==
The Jamdhar-Katari was developed approximately in the 17th century in the area of the Hindu Kush.

== Description ==
The Jamdhar-Katari has a wedge-shaped, double-edged blade of about 25 cm (9.8 in) in length, with a total length of about 35 cm (14 in). Shortly after the parry the blade runs along narrow, then something bulbous get through to the top. Some of the site (top) is reinforced in order to be strong enough armor and chainmail to pierce. The parry is remarkably wide (about 15 cm (5.9 in)). The knob has the same width. Blade, parry, grip and pommel are made of one piece and have no handles.
