= Dirk =

Thrusting dagger

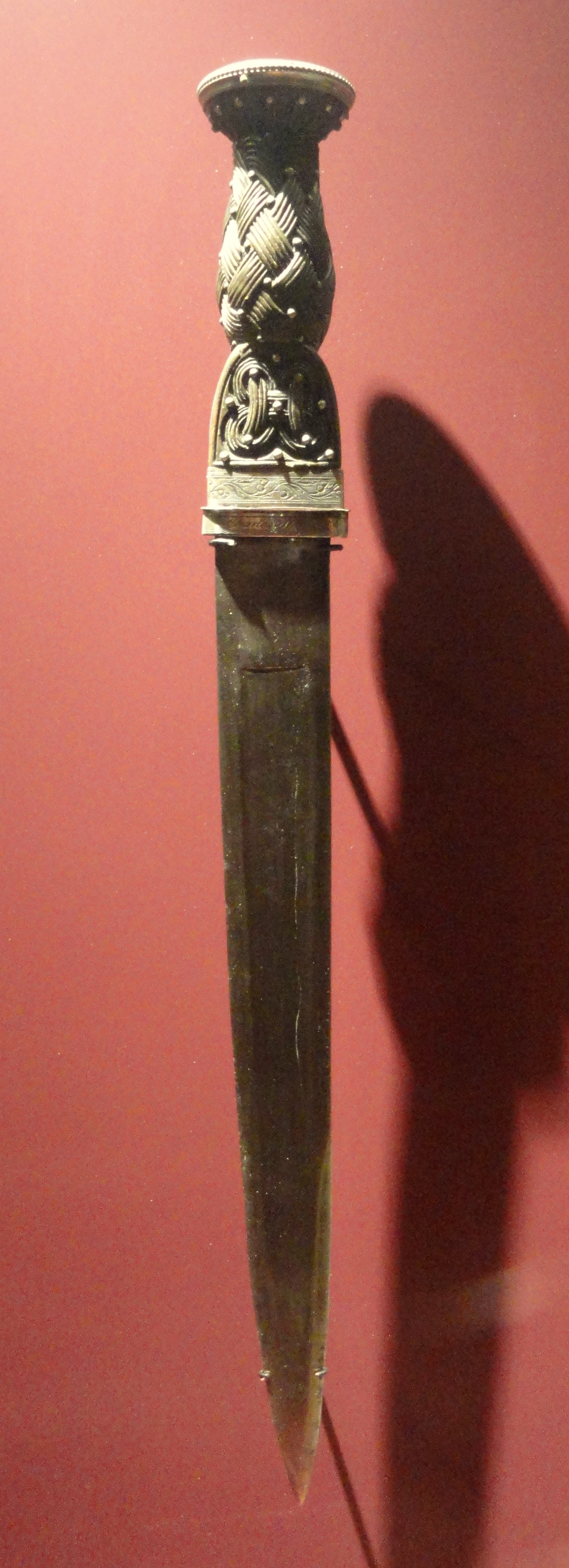
Scottish dirk, blade by Andrew Boog, Edinburgh, c. 1795, Royal Ontario Museum

A dirk is a long-bladed thrusting dagger. Historically, it gained its name from the Highland dirk (Scottish Gaelic biodag) where it was a personal weapon of officers engaged in naval hand-to-hand combat during the Age of Sail as well as the personal sidearm of Highlanders. It was also the traditional sidearm of the Highland Clansman and later used by the officers, pipers, and drummers of Scottish Highland regiments around 1725 to 1800 and by Japanese naval officers.

== Etymology ==
The term is associated with Scotland in the Early Modern Era, being attested from about 1600. The term was spelled dork or dirk during the 17th century, presumed related to the Danish, Dutch and Swedish dolk, and the German dolch, tolch; from a West Slavic Tillich. The exact etymology is unclear. The modern spelling dirk is probably due to Samuel Johnson's 1755 Dictionary. The term is also used for "dagger" generically, especially in the context of prehistoric daggers such as the Oxborough dirk.

== Highland dirk ==
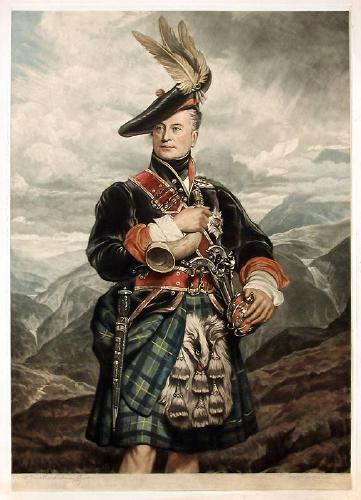
Painting of George Gordon, 5th Duke of Gordon (1770–1836) in highland dress.

The Scottish dirk (also "Highland dirk", Scottish Gaelic: biodag), as a symbolic traditional and ceremonial weapon of the Highland Cathairean (cateran or warrior), is worn by officers, pipers and drummers of Scottish Highland regiments. The development of the Scottish dirk as a weapon is unrelated to that of the naval dirk; it is a modern continuation of the 16th-century ballock or rondel dagger.

The traditional Scottish dirk is a probable development from the 16th century but like all medieval societies, the Highlander needed a knife for everyday use. The dirk became symbolic of a Highland man’s honour and oaths were sworn on the steel which was believed to be holy. The following highlights the importance of the dirk in Highland culture:

The dirk occupies a unique niche in Highland culture and history. Many Highland Scots were too cash-poor to buy a sword, following the Disarming Acts enacted to erode Highland martial insurrections but virtually every male carried a dirk—and carried it everywhere! If in Japan the katana was the soul of the Samurai, in Scotland the dirk was the heart of the Highlander. In many warrior cultures oaths were sworn on one's sword. Among the Gael, however, binding oaths with the force of a geas (involving dire supernatural penalties for breaking such an oath) were sworn on one's dirk. The English, aware of this, used the custom against the Highlanders after Culloden: When Highland dress was prohibited in 1747 those Gael who could not read or sign an oath were required to swear a verbal oath, "in the Irish (Scots Gaelic) tongue and upon the holy iron of their dirks", not to possess any gun, sword, or pistol, or to use tartan: "... and if I do so may I be cursed in my undertakings, family and property, may I be killed in battle as a coward, and lie without burial in a strange land, far from the graves of my forefathers and kindred; may all this come across me if I break my oath."

During the period of proscription, only service in a British regiment permitted Highlanders to bear their traditional arms and dress. The 78th Fraser Highlanders, raised in 1757, wore full highland dress uniform; their equipment was described by Major-General James Stewart in 1780 as including a "musket and broadsword, to which many soldiers added the dirk at their own expense."

When worn, the dirk normally hangs by a leather strap known as a "frog" from a dirk belt, which is a wide leather belt having a large, usually ornate buckle, that is worn around the waist with a kilt. Many Scottish dirks carry a smaller knife and fork which fit into compartments on the front of the sheath, and a smaller knife known as a sgian dubh is also worn tucked into the top of the hose when wearing a kilt.

== Naval dirk ==
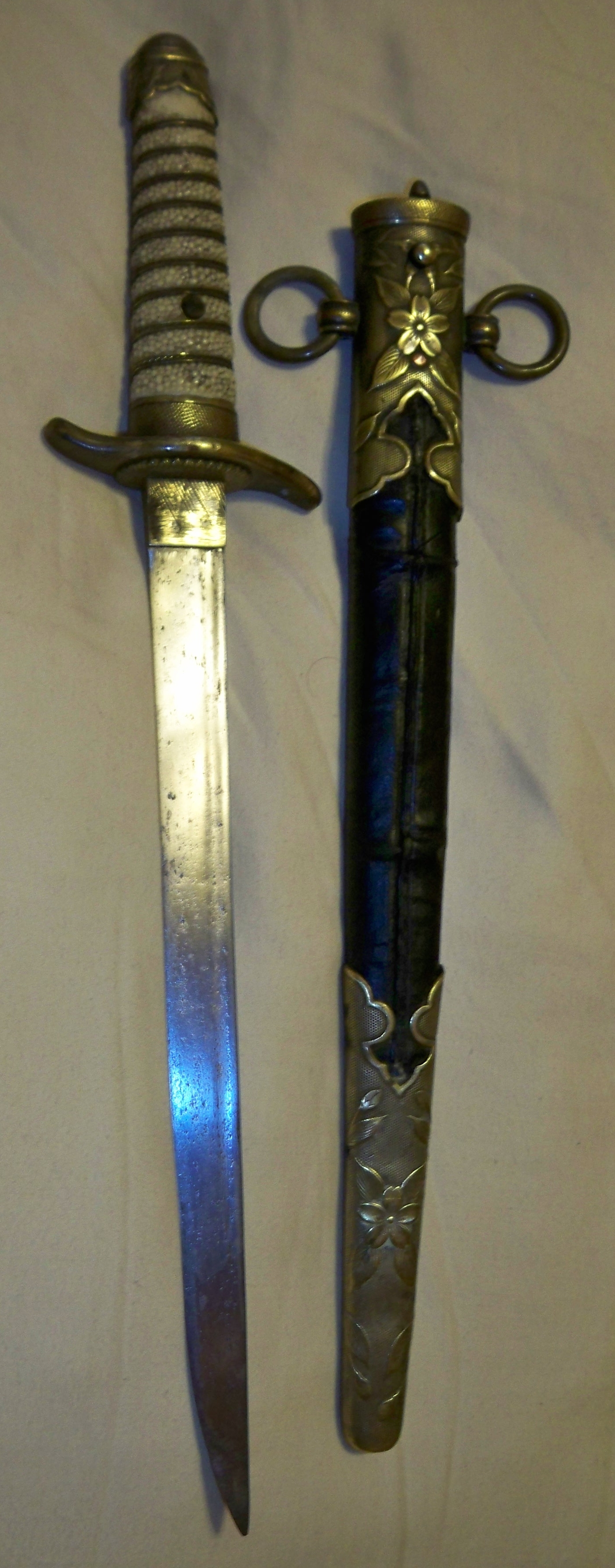
Japanese WW2 naval dirk

A thrusting weapon, the naval dirk originally functioned as a boarding weapon and as a functional fighting dagger. During the days of sail, midshipmen and officers wore dirks; the daggers gradually evolved into ceremonial weapons and badges of office. In the Royal Navy, the naval dirk is still presented to junior officers; the basic design of the weapon has changed little in the last 500 years.

In the Russian Empire naval dirk (Russian: кортик) became part of the uniform of naval officers and civilian officials in the Navy Ministry. After the October Revolution of 1917, naval dirks were the weapons of naval officers in the Soviet navy. Later, they were also allowed as an element of the dress uniform for army generals and army officers. On December 13, 1996, president of the Russian Federation Boris Yeltsin signed the federal law № 150, which entered into force on July 1, 1997. In accordance with this law, possession of swords, sabres, daggers and other edged and bladed weapons (incl. naval dirks) was prohibited. The arming of naval officers with naval dirks was discontinued. On December 17, 2015, at a press conference with President Vladimir Putin, a retired naval captain voiced a request to return to naval officers the right to own a naval dirk as a personal weapon. In March 2017, the State Duma adopted amendments to the legislation, which provided for the restoration of the tradition of wearing naval dirks by naval officers from July 1, 2017 and their wearing with military uniform after retirement. Until November 29, 2021, retired military personnel were required to register their dirks as bladed weapons within 14 days of retiring or being dismissed from military service; on October 26, 2021, the legislation was amended (according to which military personnel of the armed forces, as well as retirees of MVD and all other state paramilitary organizations, are exempt from the need to register their naval dirks and combat knives)

Later, it became an element of other uniforms as well, e.g. of officers in the Russian and Polish army (Polish: kordzik) and air force and of the police forces in some countries.

In the United States, the dirk was introduced by Scottish immigrants in the 1700s. Dirks were originally a single-edged weapon. By 1745, however, the weapon more commonly had a double-edged blade; this makes the dirk more or less synonymous with the dagger. Dirks were often made from old sword blades. In the nineteenth century dirks started to be made with a curved blade, but returned to a straight blade by the end of the century. Some were long enough to be considered a short sword.

== See also ==
- Cutlass, another blade weapon specialized for naval hand-to-hand combat
- Sgian-dubh
- Kindjal
- Knife fight
