= Anelace =

Type of dagger from 14th century England

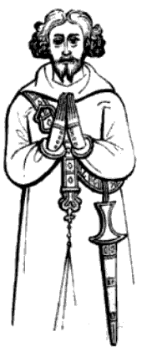
14th century English gentleman wearing an anelace on his girdle

An anelace (or in Middle English anelas) was a medieval dagger worn as a gentleman's accoutrement in 14th century England.

Frederick William Fairholt (1846) describes it as "a knife or dagger worn at the girdle", and George Russell French (1869) as "a large dagger, or a short sword, [that] appears to have been worn, suspended by a ring from the girdle, almost exclusively by civilians".

Anelaces had a broad blade "sharp on both edges, and became narrower from hilt to point". Auguste Demmin (1870) also uses the term "anelace" for the similar cinquedeas of 15th century Italy. The term is attested from 1250 to 1300 in the Middle English form of an(e)las, which is derived from the Old French ale(s)naz, a derivative of alesne (awl), itself derived from the Old High German alasna.

French mentions numerous examples of anelaces appearing in 14th century English art. They were also mentioned in literature. In Chaucer's Canterbury Tales, a franklin (a landowner) wears "an anelace and a gipciere [pouch] all of silk / Hung at his girdle, white as morwe milk", and in an undated English translation of the poem of Partonopeus de Blois, King Sornegur wears "an anelas sharp-pointed".
