= Piha kaetta =

Knife/dagger from Sri Lanka

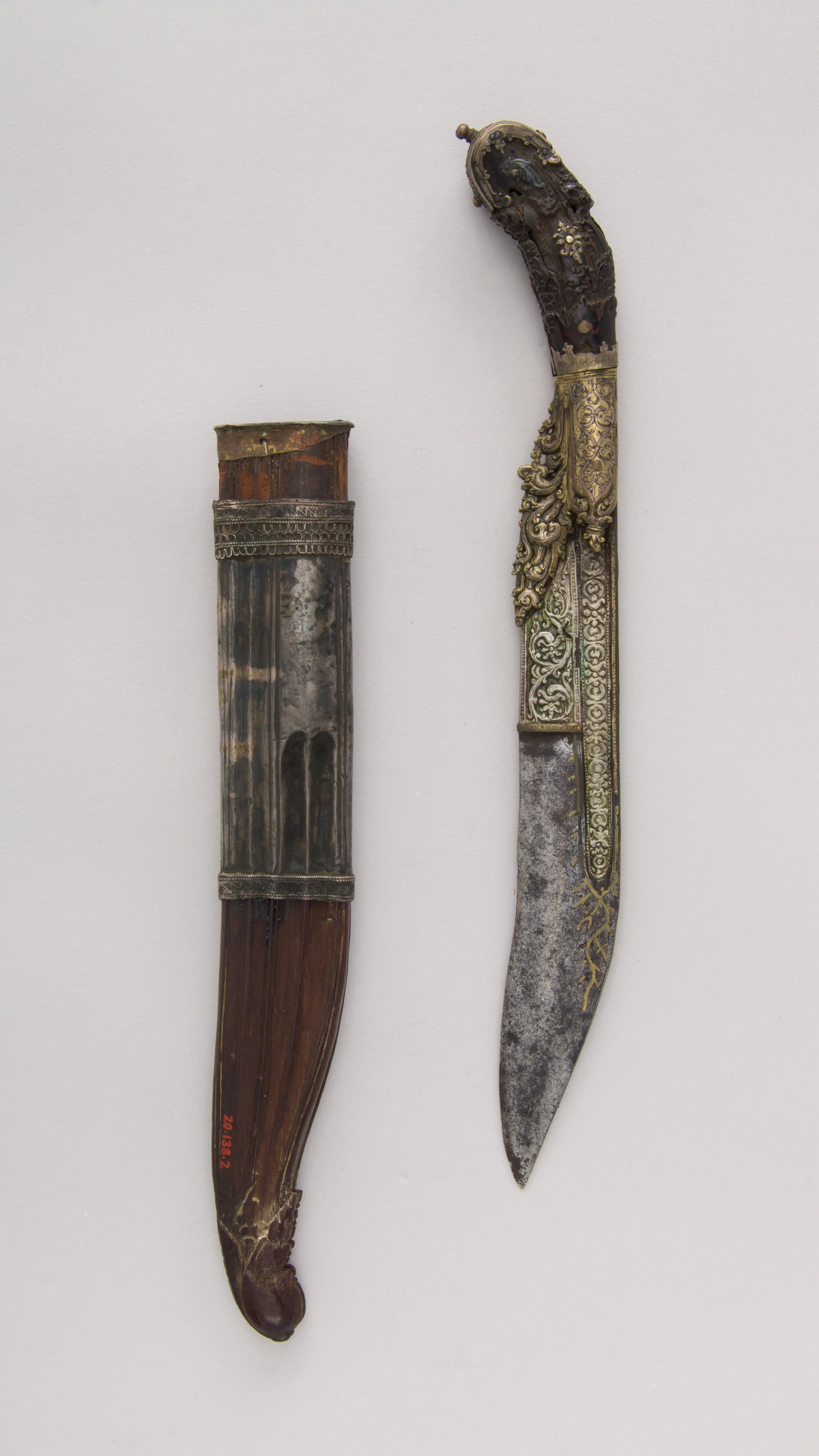
Sri Lankan piha kaetta, with decorative silver panels applied to the blade, and a horn handle

The piha kaetta, also sometimes called the Kandyan knife, is a knife or dagger native to the island of Sri Lanka. A typical piha kaetta has a straight-backed blade combined with a drop-point and a curved cutting edge. Many of the finest piha kaetta knives were produced in royal workshops, show very high levels of craftsmanship, and were given to courtiers and the nobility as status symbols.

== Background – daggers in South Asia ==
During the golden age of the Mughal Empire in India from the 16th to the early 18th century, dagger production and use was widespread. These daggers were notable for their high-quality metalwork, fine ornamentation and distinctive elegant forms. The graceful form found in many daggers and knives during the period indicates influence from the Islamic world. These daggers were often worn by princes and nobles for self-defence, for hunting, or for display. In combat, they were weapons for close-quarter combat, and some were capable of piercing the mail armour of Indian warriors.

== Piha kaetta - development, use and production ==
Between the late 17th century and the 18th century, Sri Lanka began to locally produce the piha kaetta, a kind of knife with a graceful 'recurved' edge, they represent the south-easternmost extension of a blade shape similar to the Nepalese kukri and Turkish yatagan. Unlike the Mughal-influenced subcontinental daggers, which were mostly used as status symbols and in combat, the lower-quality piha kaetta of Sri Lanka were often employed for everyday use in farm work, or in the wilderness. However, the higher-quality weapons were essentially status symbols, but were also undoubtedly used in combat and for self-defence. The finest piha kaetta were made at the "four workshops" (pattal-hatara), a kind of craft guild where a selected group of craftsmen worked exclusively for the king and his royal court, or for others only by the king's permission. The name "four workshops" refer to respectively the "jewel", "crown", "golden sword," and "throne" workshops. In Sri Lanka, the arts of building, painting, ivory-carving, jewellery, etc. were in the hands of a hereditary guild or caste of craftsmen which occupied an honourable position.

== Characteristics ==
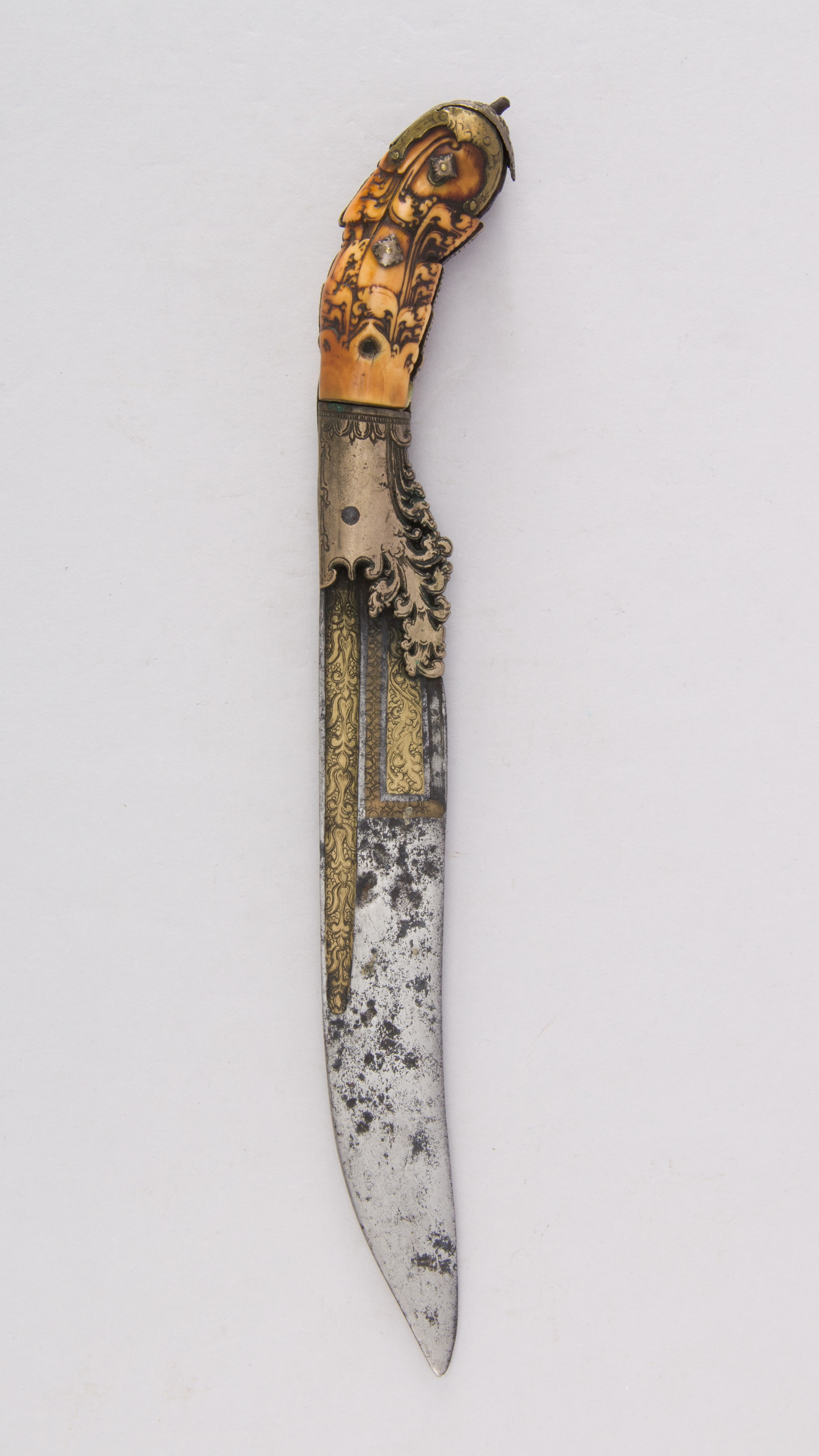
An ivory handled piha kaetta, showing liya-pata type decorative carving to the grip scales and brass inlay to the blade

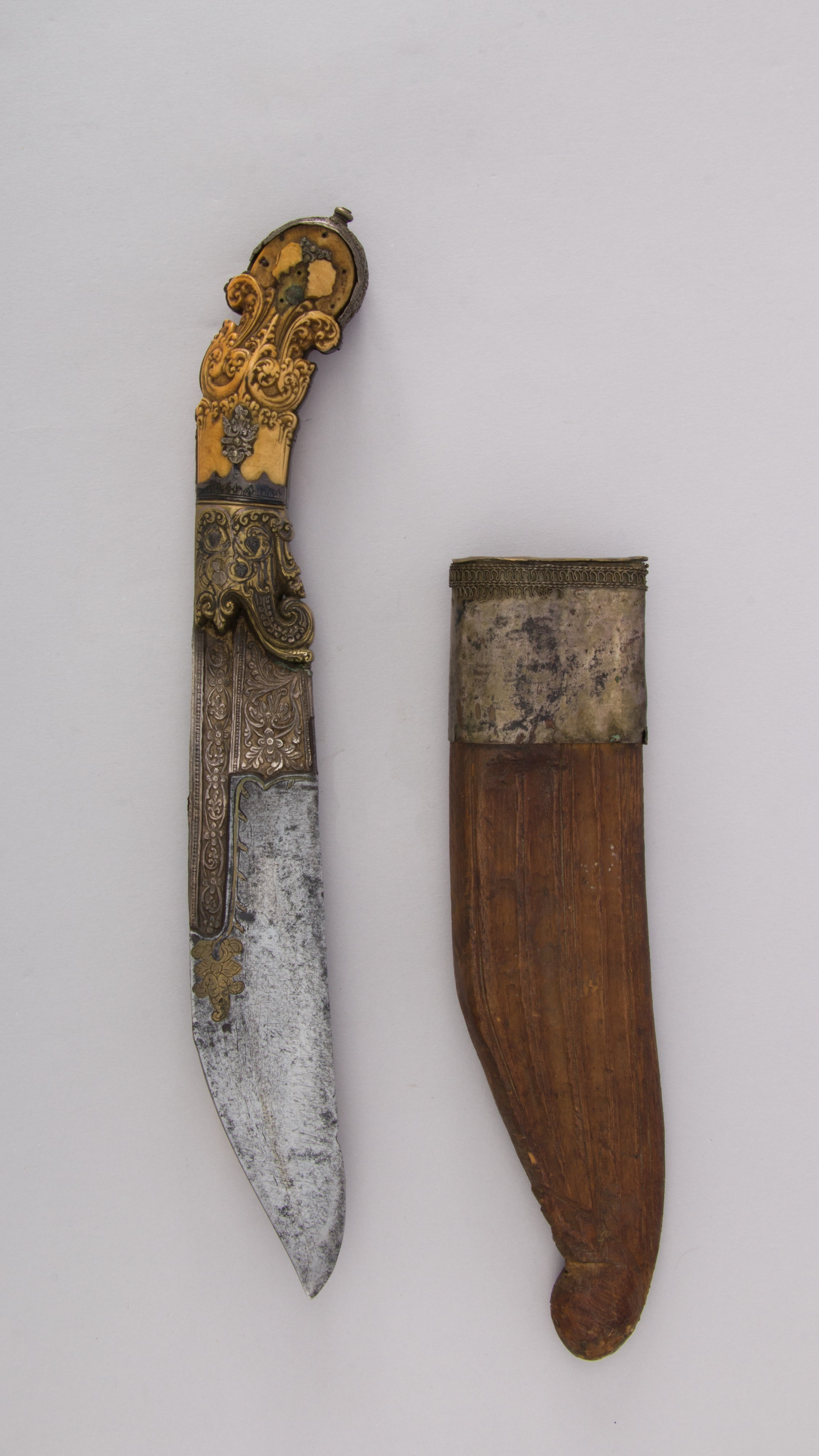
A particularly wide-bladed piha kaetta, with an ivory handle

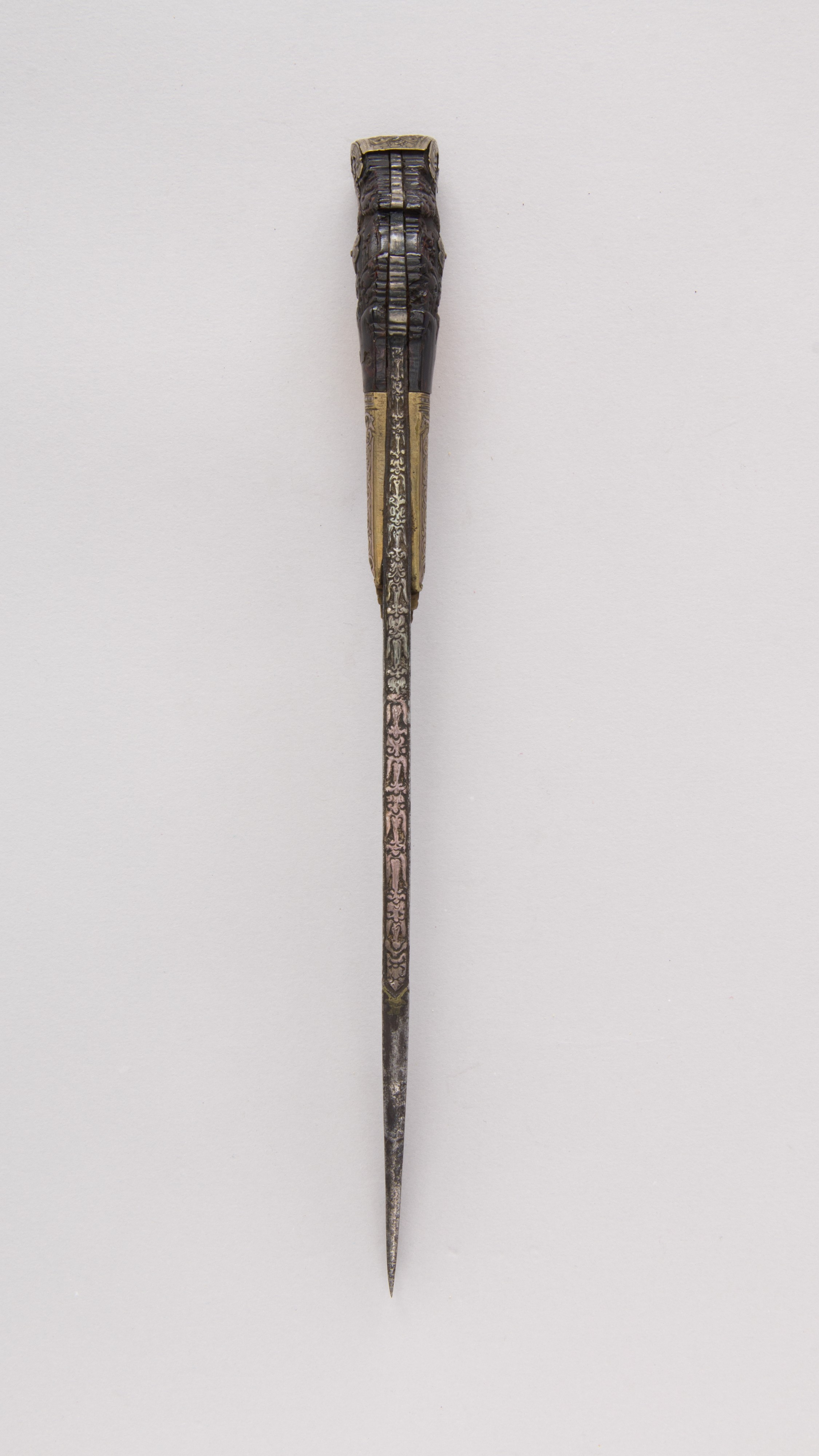
The knife shown at the top of the page, viewed blunt-edge towards the viewer. The very thick back of the blade can be seen and its inlaid decoration

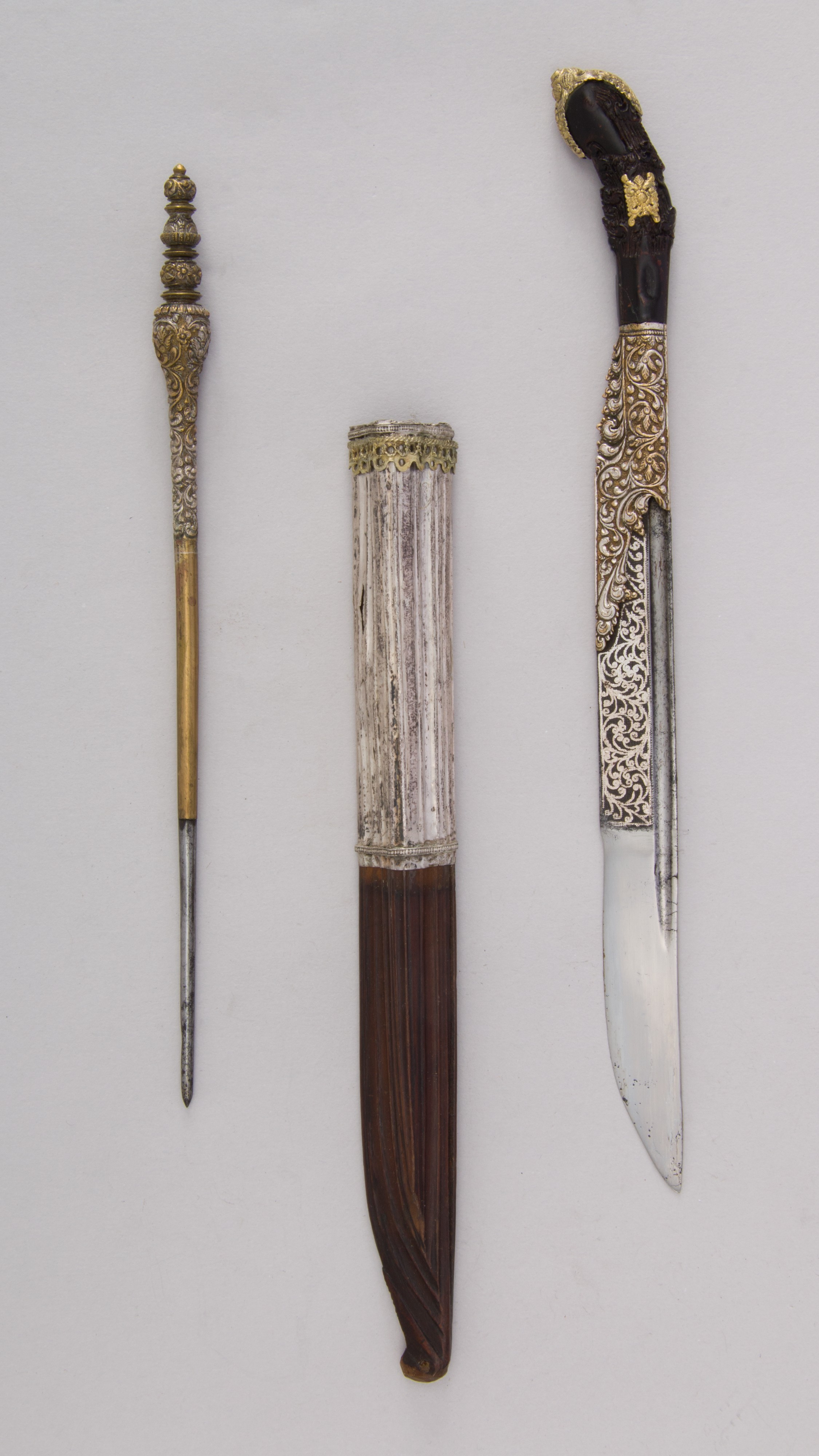
This smaller and more delicate piha kaetta (more properly termed an ul pihiya) has a stylus carried in the sheath with the knife

The typical piha kaetta has a heavy blade about 0.5 inches (1.3 cm) to 2 inches (5.1 cm) wide and 5 inches (13 cm) to 8 inches (20 cm) long, with a very thick back, up to 0.4 inches (1.0 cm). The thick back of the blade combined with a slab-sided, triangular cross-section gives the blade great weight for its length; this imparts considerable momentum to the knife when used to cut. Most knives have a narrow, but deep, fuller near the back of the blade. Kaetta means a "beak" or "billhook", probably referring to the knife's down curving tip.

Simple piha kaettas are plain and made of steel with a wooden or horn hilt. Higher quality piha kaettas are finely decorated: the fuller, the section of blade below it and the back of the blade are often inlaid with thin sheet brass or silver panels, decorated with stylised patterns in repoussé and chasing. The hilts of high quality piha kaettas are made from a variety of materials e.g. precious metals (gold, silver), brass, copper, rock crystal, ivory, horn, steel or wood. The handles are of a characteristic shape, almost like the grip of a pistol, specific to the piha kaetta. Often the grip-scales are carved with the liya-pata, a stylised 'breaking wave' pattern. This type of handle usually has small silver plaques, often flower-shaped, pinned to each side and a larger, curving, repoussé silver or brass pommel-cap. Occasionally, the end of the handle is carved in the form of the head of a mythical figure, such as the sérapéṅdiya bird. The larger 'chopper-like' knives are the true piha kaetta, the slimmer, straighter-bladed, more delicate knives, often provided with a silver-inlaid stylus in the same sheath, are more properly termed ul pihiya. Sheaths are of a light wood, usually longitudinally ribbed. They often have decorative sheet silver or brass sheathing at the throat, extending a variable distance down the length of the sheath.

== Cited works ==
- Deraniyagala, P.E.P. (1942) Sinhala Weapons and Armour, Journal of the Ceylon Branch of the Royal Asiatic Society, Volume XXXV, No. 95 Part III, 7 December 1942.
- Gahir, Sunita; Spencer, Sharon, eds. (2006). Weapon - A Visual History of Arms and Armor. New York City: DK Publishing. ISBN 9780756622107.
- Hales, Robert (2013) Islamic and Oriental Arms and Armour: A Lifetime's Passion, Robert Hales CI Ltd., England ISBN 978-0992631505
- Parker, Henry (1909) Ancient Ceylon: An Account of the Aborigines and of Part of the Early Civilization, Luzac & Co., London
- Stone, George Cameron (2013). A Glossary of the Construction, Decoration and Use of Arms and Armor: in All Countries and in All Times. Dover: Courier Corporation. ISBN 9780486131290.
- Wright, Arnold (1907). Twentieth Century Impressions of Ceylon: Its History, People, Commerce, Industries, and Resources. Asian Educational Services. ISBN 9788120613355.
