= Shuckra =

Indian melee weapon

A shuckra is a weapon of Indian heritage and consists of a series of metal tubes on a wire connected to a (metal) handle. By locking the handle and pulling on an internal wire the device becomes taut and may be used as a stabbing weapon.
