= Rondel dagger =

Type of stiff-bladed dagger

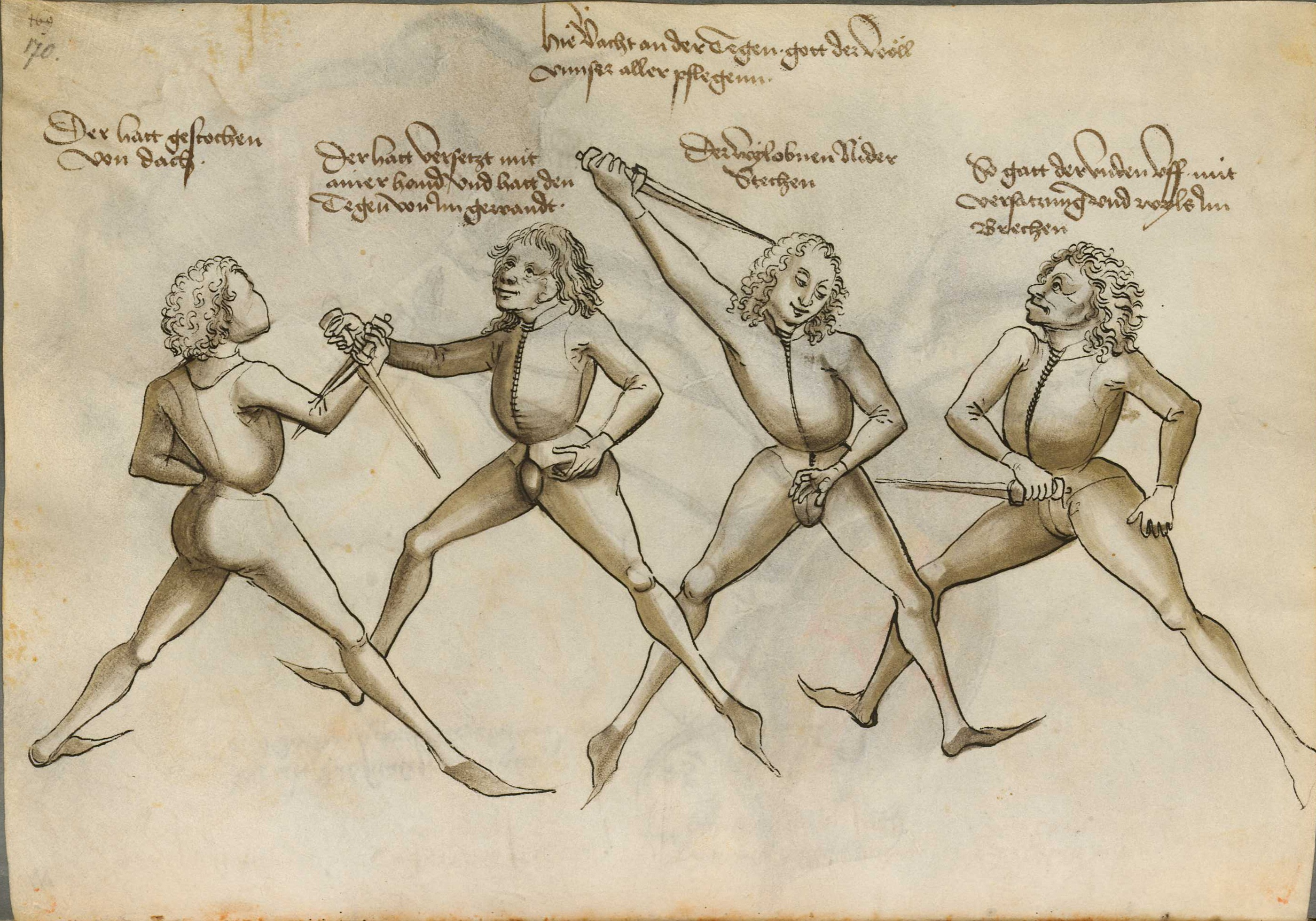
Close-quarter fighting with rondel daggers from Hans Talhoffer's Fechtbuch. This image is from a manual of combat from 1467. It is one of a series of images of two men fighting hand to hand with rondels, demonstrating possible attacks and defences.

A rondel dagger /ˈrɒndəl/ or roundel dagger is a type of stiff-bladed dagger used in Europe in the late Middle Ages (from the 14th century onwards), used by a variety of people from merchants to knights. It was worn at the waist and could be used as a utility tool, or worn into battle or in a jousting tournament as a side arm.

== Design and construction ==
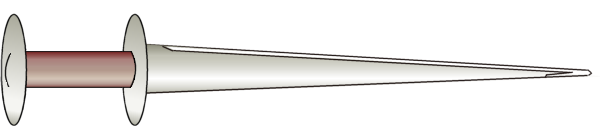
The basic form of a rondel dagger

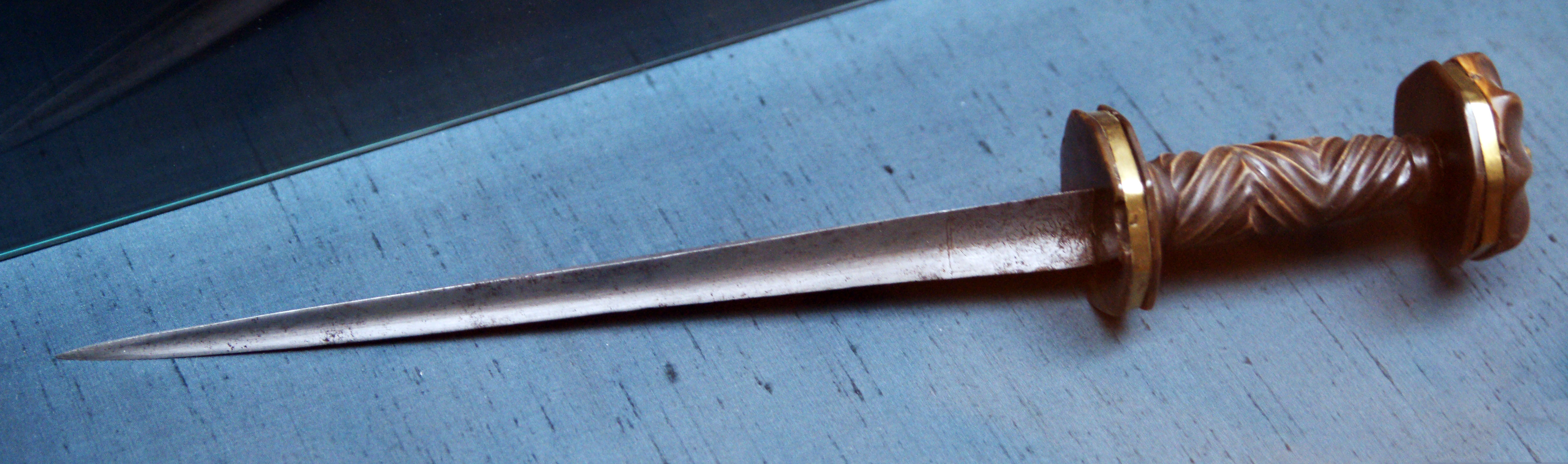
Rondel dagger (Burgundy, c. 1500)

The blade is made of steel, and is typically long and slim with a tapering needle point, measuring 12 in (30 cm) or more; the whole dagger can be as long as 20 in (51 cm). Rondel means 'round' or 'circular'; the dagger gets its name from its round (or similarly shaped, e.g. octagonal) hand guard and round or spherical pommel (knob on the end of the grip).

The blade's tang extends through the handle, which is cylindrical, normally carved from wood or bone. In cross section, the blade is usually diamond-shaped, lenticular, or triangular. These blades have a sharpened point, and either one or both edges are also sharpened, while some had no sharpened edges at all. They were principally designed for use with a stabbing action, either underarm, or over arm with a reverse grip (reminiscent of an ice pick). The long straight blade does not lend itself to a slashing or sabre action.

Rondel daggers were designed to be ideal for close-quarter combat which often requires grappling. They were used for puncturing and bursting the links in mail armour and they could penetrate the weaker points in plate armour and helmets, such as areas of thinner plate, any gaps and the various joints. The wide, spherical pommel might have assisted by making it easier for the user to push or punch the point of the dagger home. As armour improved, puncturing in such ways was one of the only ways in which the heavy armour of men-at-arms could be breached.

Examples also exist of four-edged rondel daggers, the blade having a cruciform profile. These blades are not suited for cutting, or use as a general utility tool; they were worn as a side-arm in battle as a thrusting weapon, foreshadowing the appearance of the stiletto in the 16th century. Rondel daggers which have survived and found their way into museums and collections are usually those with fine craftsmanship and often ornate decoration. The blades may be engraved, the grips ornately carved, and the hand guards and pommels highly decorated.

== Use ==
The rondel dagger evolved in the 14th century from the early knightly dagger of the 12th to 13th centuries, matching the evolution of full plate armour. By the 15th century it had become the standard side-arm for knights, and was carried into battle, such as the Battle of Agincourt in 1415. The contemporary post-mortem on the remains of King Richard III showed that at the Battle of Bosworth, in 1485, he suffered a sharp blow from a pointed weapon such as a rondel dagger on the crown of the head, before other fatal wounds were administered. They were a knight's backup weapon to be used in hand-to-hand fighting, and as such one of their last lines of defense. Since they were able to penetrate a suit of armour (at the joints, or through the visor of the helmet), rondel daggers could be used to force an unseated or wounded knight to surrender and be kept for ransom.

In the 15th century, the rondel dagger also rose to popularity among the emerging middle class. In a scene from a miniature by Girart de Roussillon, depicting the construction of twelve churches in France (c. 1448), merchants and tradesmen can be seen wearing rondel daggers at their waists.

Hans Talhoffer, in his combat manuals of the 1440s to 1460s, includes numerous examples of techniques for fighting with the rondel dagger, both in unarmoured combat and in single combat in armour.

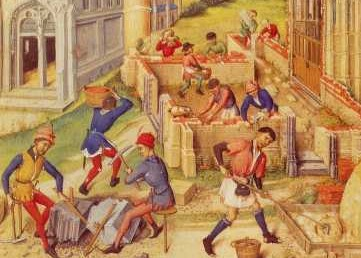
Merchants wearing rondels (uncropped version)

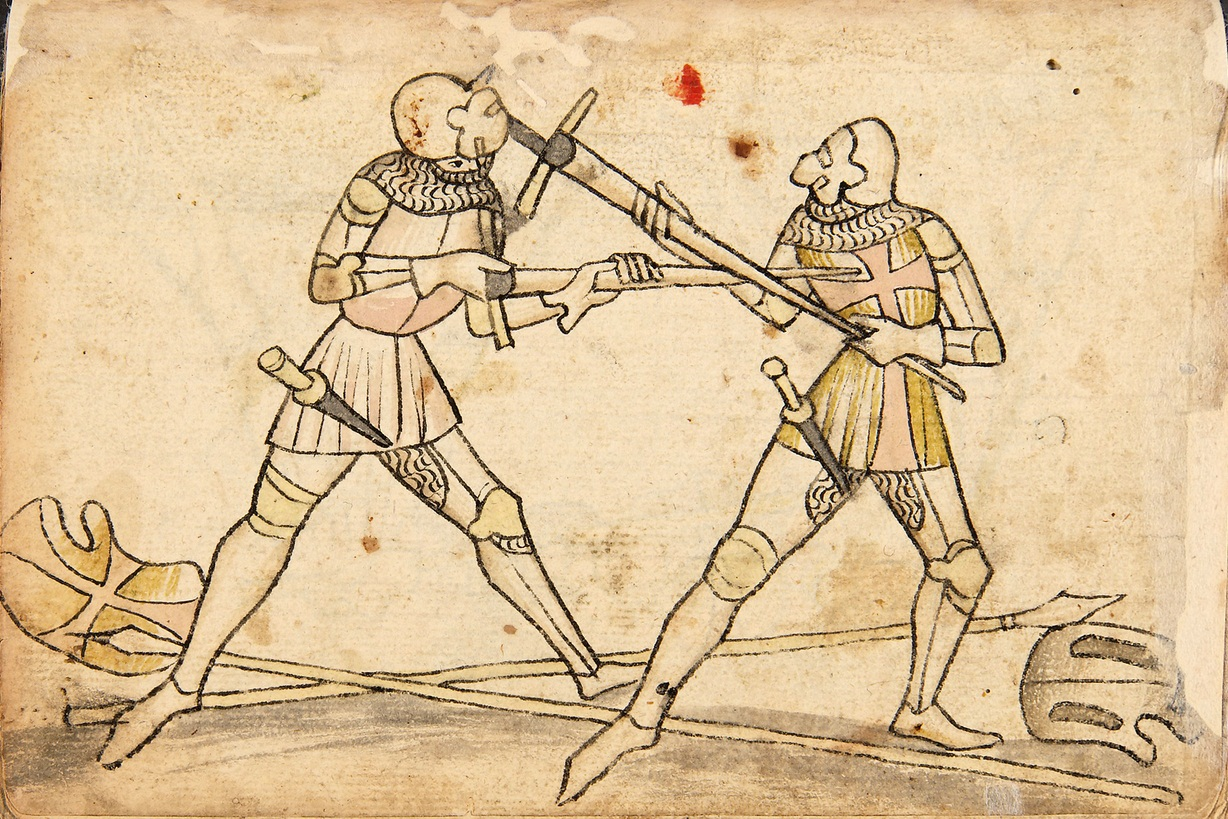
Armoured longsword combatants wearing roundel daggers as backup weapons (plate 214, Codex Wallerstein, 15th century)

== See also ==
- List of daggers
- List of medieval weapons
- Military technology and equipment
