= Bollock dagger =

Type of dagger

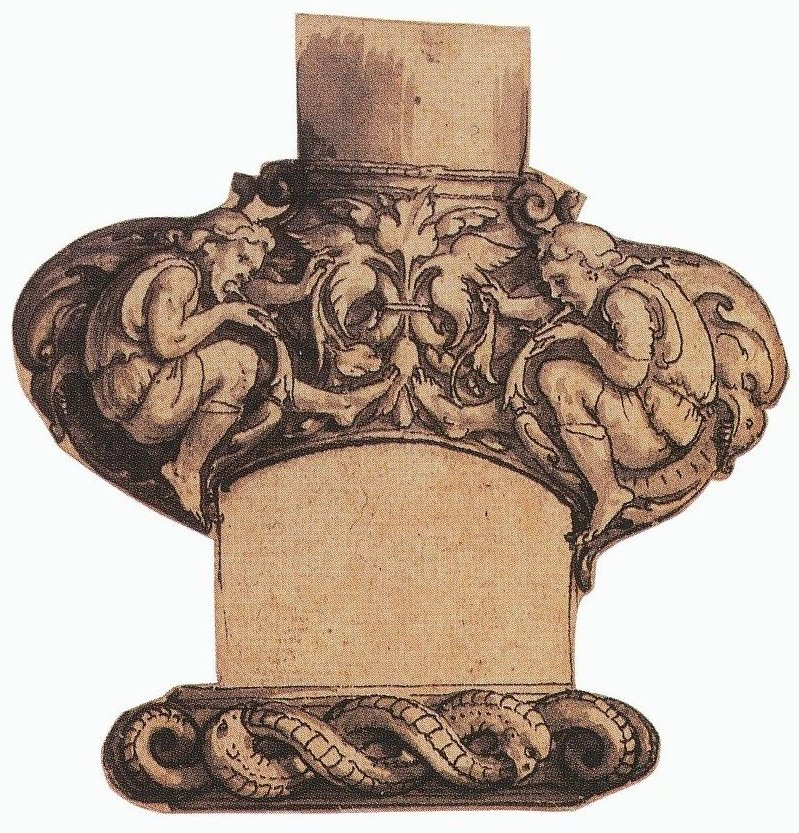
Design of a guard for a ballock-dagger with top mount of the scabbard, by Hans Holbein the Younger, c. 1536–1538

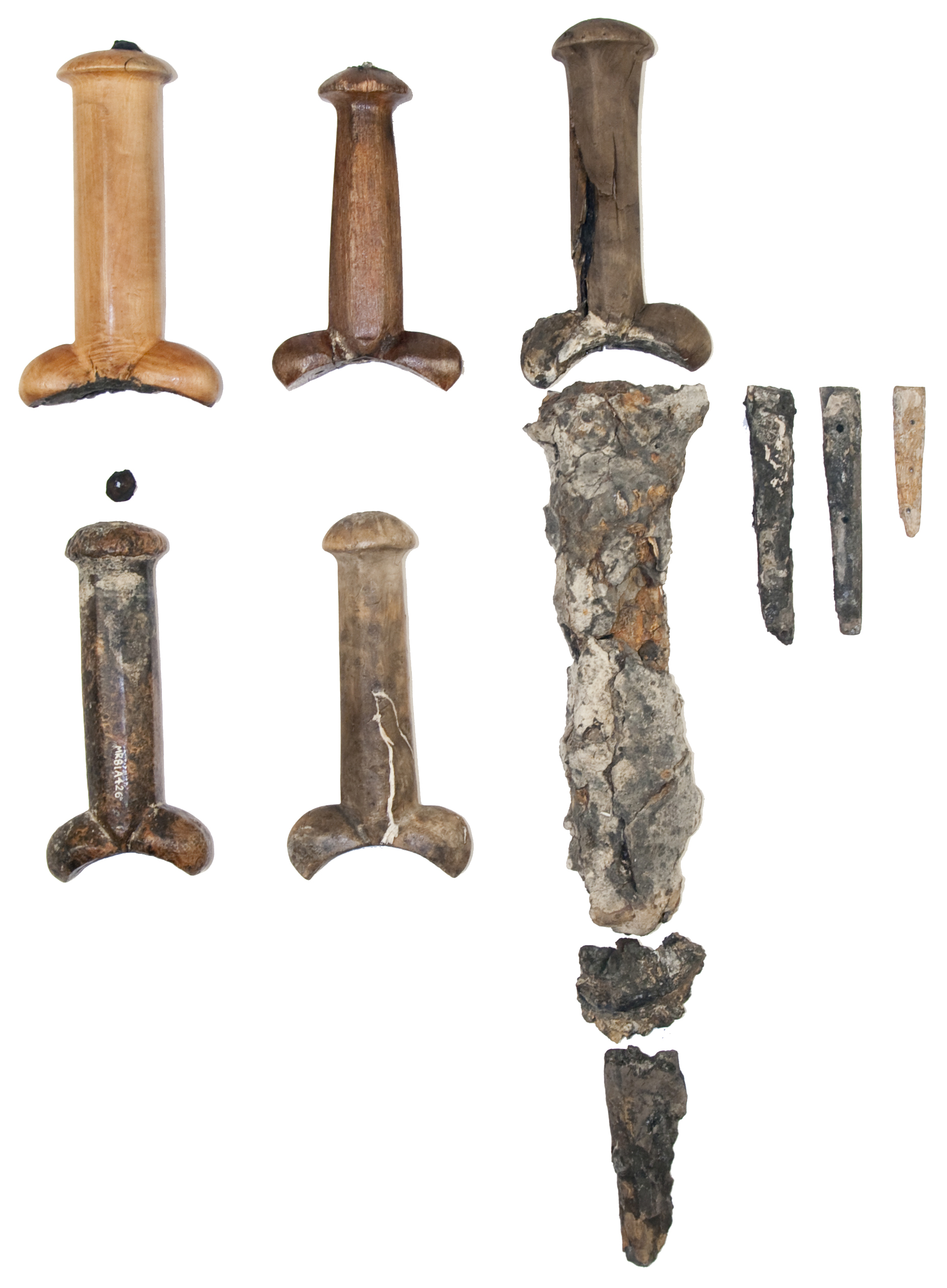
A set of bollock daggers found on board the 16th century ship Mary Rose. The blades have either completely corroded or remain only in the form of concretions.

A bollock dagger or ballock knife is a type of dagger with a distinctively shaped hilt, with two oval swellings at the guard resembling male genitalia (ballocks or "bollocks"). The guard is often in one piece with the ivory grip, and reinforced on top with a shaped metal washer. The dagger was popular in Scandinavia, Flanders, Wales, Scotland and England between the 13th and 18th centuries, in particular the Tudor period. Within Britain the bollock dagger was commonly carried, including by Border Reivers, as a backup for the lance and the sword. Many such weapons were found aboard the wreck of the Mary Rose. The bollock dagger is the predecessor to the Scottish dirk.

In the Victorian period, weapon historians introduced the term kidney dagger, due to the two lobes at the guard, which could also be seen as kidney-shaped, in order to avoid any sexual connotation. The hilt was often constructed of box root (dudgeon) in the 16th and 17th centuries, and the dagger was sometimes called a dudgeon dagger or dudgeonhafted dagger in this period.

The dagger first started appearing on continental effigies around 1300–1350, and has one of the longest usage periods of any of the five main types of medieval daggers.
