= Dagger =

Short, pointed hand-to-hand weapon

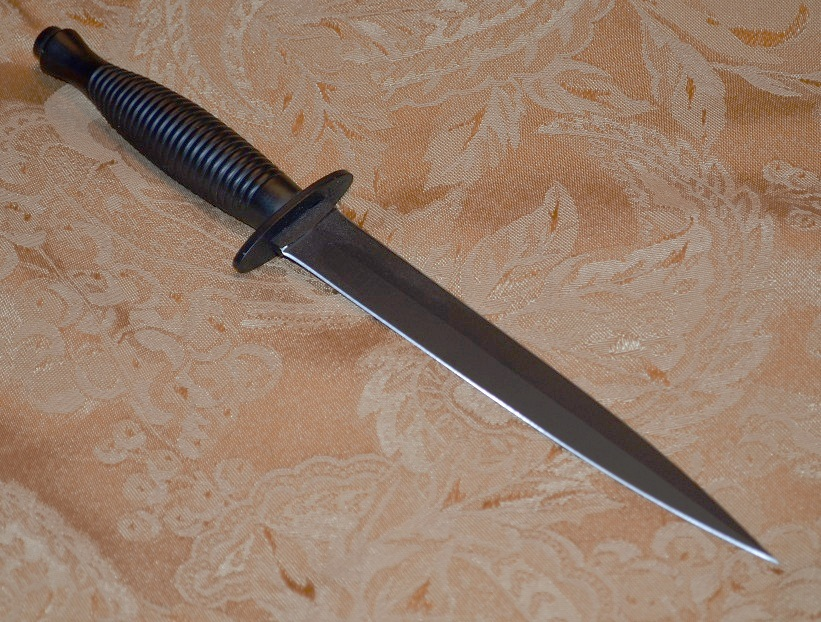
The Fairbairn–Sykes fighting knife, a modern-day dagger

A dagger is a fighting knife typically with a very sharp point and usually one or two sharp edges, typically designed or capable of being used as a cutting or thrusting weapon. Daggers have been used throughout human history for close combat confrontations, and many cultures have used adorned daggers in ritual and ceremonial contexts. The dagger's distinctive shape and historic usage have made it iconic and symbolic. In the modern sense, a dagger is designed for close-proximity combat or self-defense; due to its use in historic weapon assemblages, it has associations with assassination and murder. However, double-edged knives play different roles in different social contexts.

A wide variety of thrusting knives have been described as daggers, including knives that feature only a single cutting edge, such as the European rondel dagger or the Afghan pesh-kabz, or, in some instances, no cutting edge at all, such as the stiletto of the Renaissance. However, in the last hundred years or so, in most contexts, a dagger has specific definable characteristics, including a short blade with a sharply tapered point, a central spine or fuller, and usually two cutting edges sharpened the entire length of the blade, or nearly so. Most daggers also feature a full crossguard to keep the hand from riding forwards onto the sharpened blade edges.

Daggers are primarily weapons, so knife legislation in many places restricts their manufacture, sale, possession, transport, or use.

== History ==
=== Antiquity ===
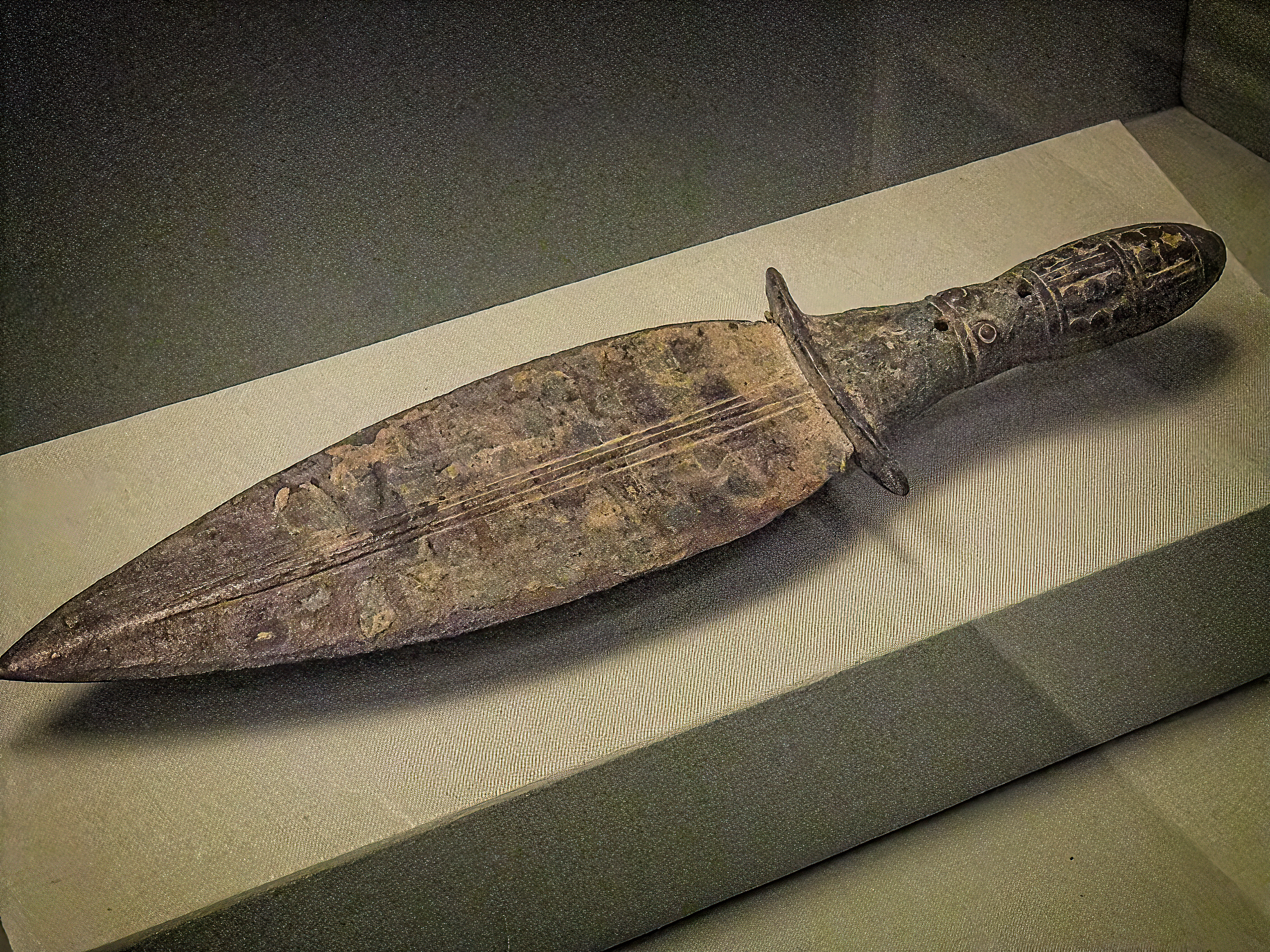
A bronze dagger from Lorestan, Iran, 2600–2350 BCE

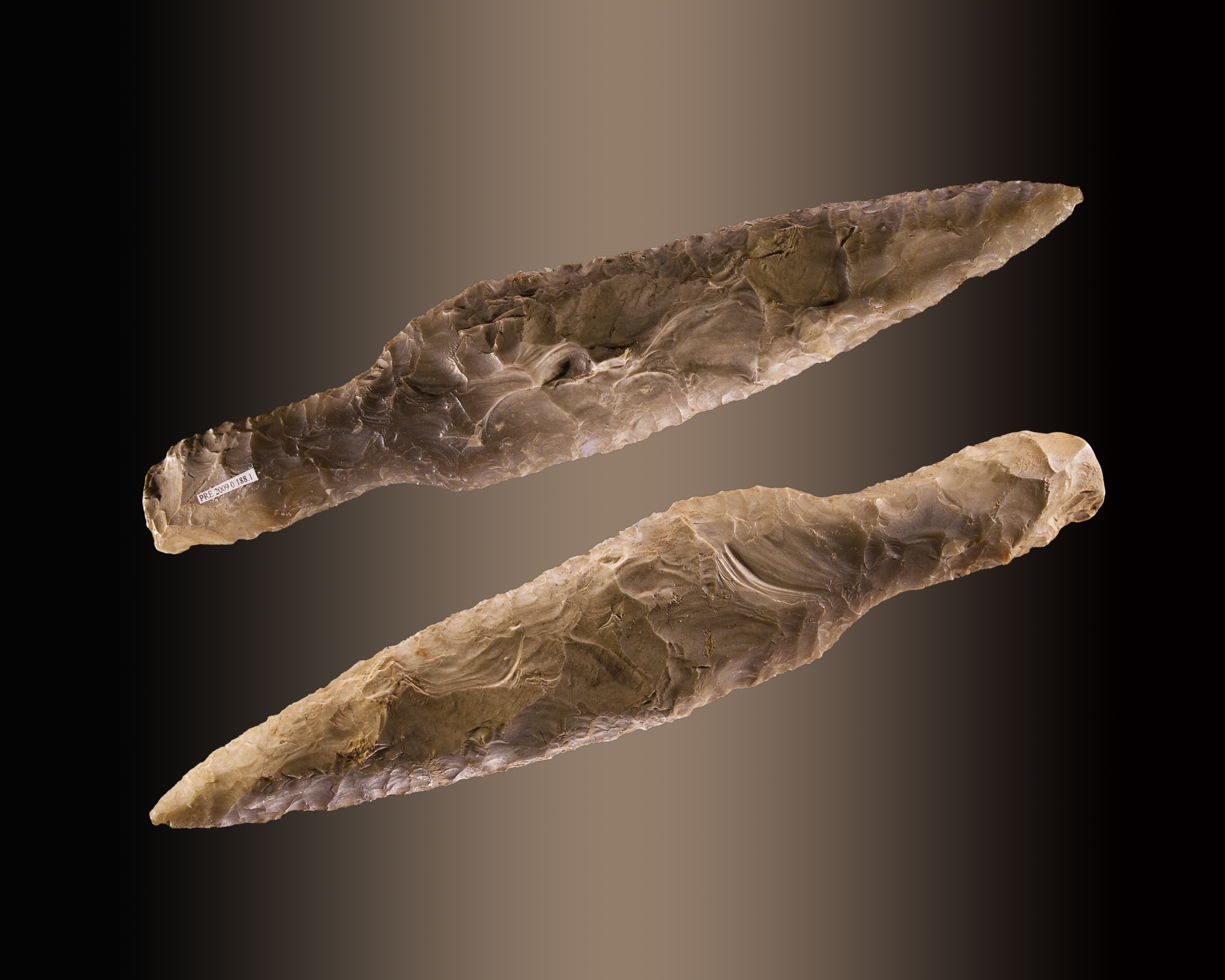
A Neolithic dagger from the Muséum de Toulouse

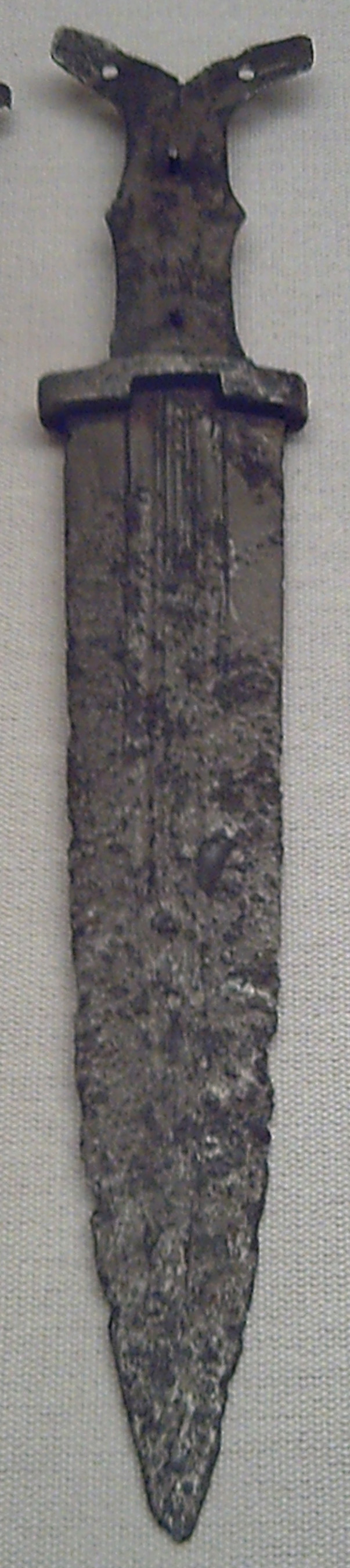
Pre-Roman Iberian iron dagger forged between the middle of the 5th and the 3rd century BC

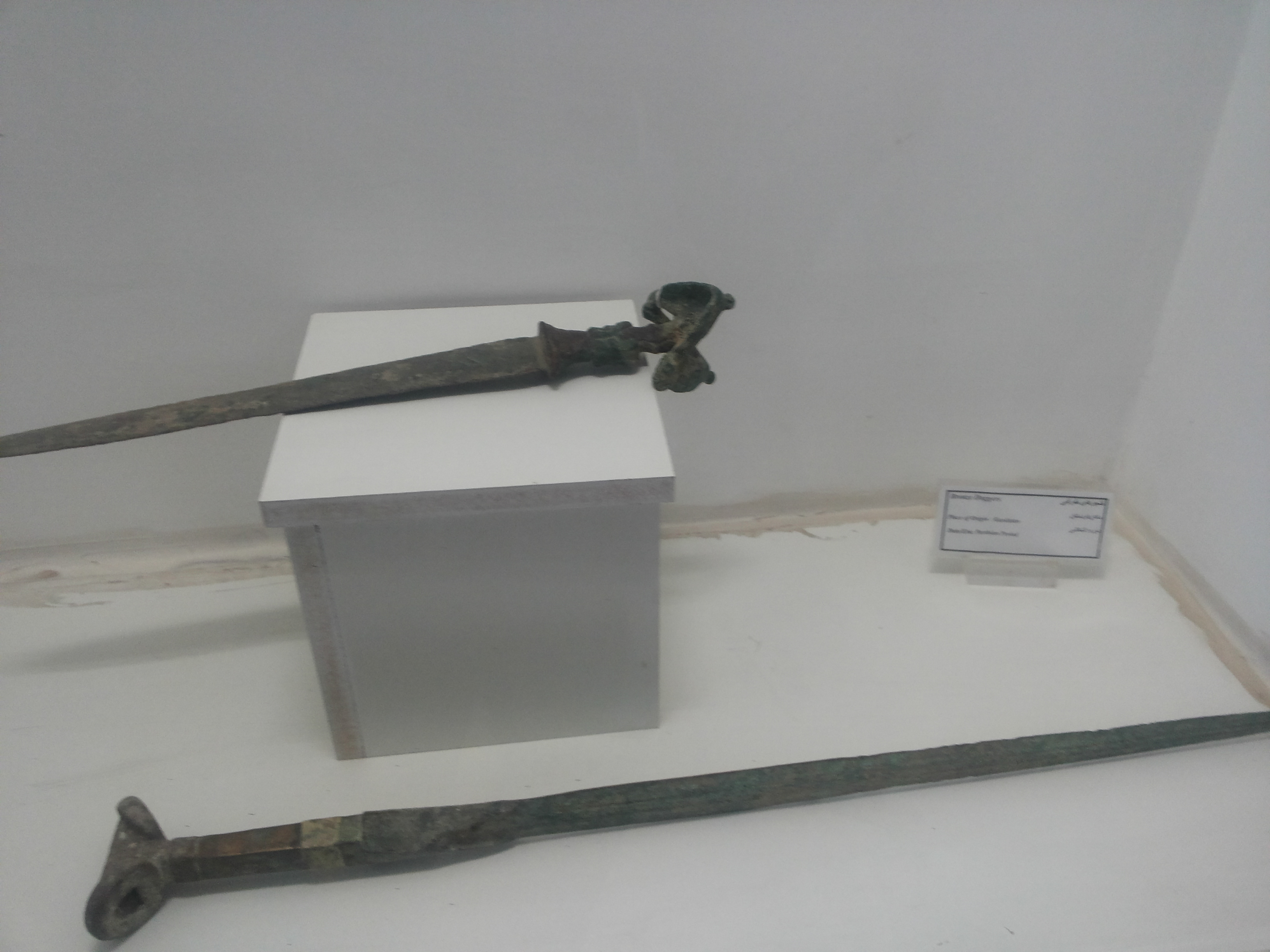
Bronze Age swords, Iranian Kurdistan, Museum of Sanandaj

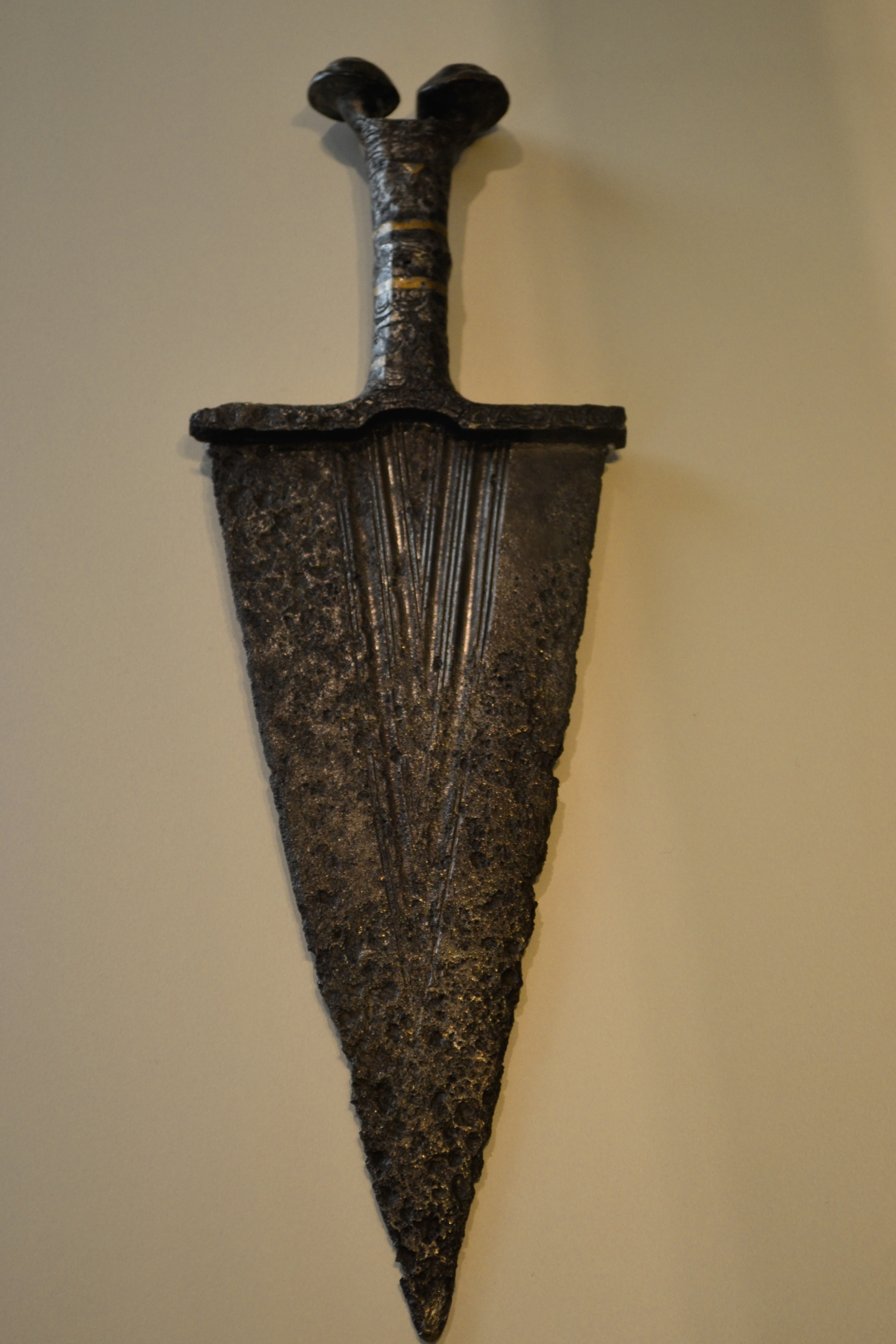
Iberian triangular iron dagger, c. 399–200 BC

The earliest daggers were made of materials such as flint, ivory or bone in Neolithic times.

Copper daggers appeared first in the early Bronze Age, in the 3rd millennium BC, and copper daggers of Early Minoan III (2400–2000 BC) were recovered at Knossos.

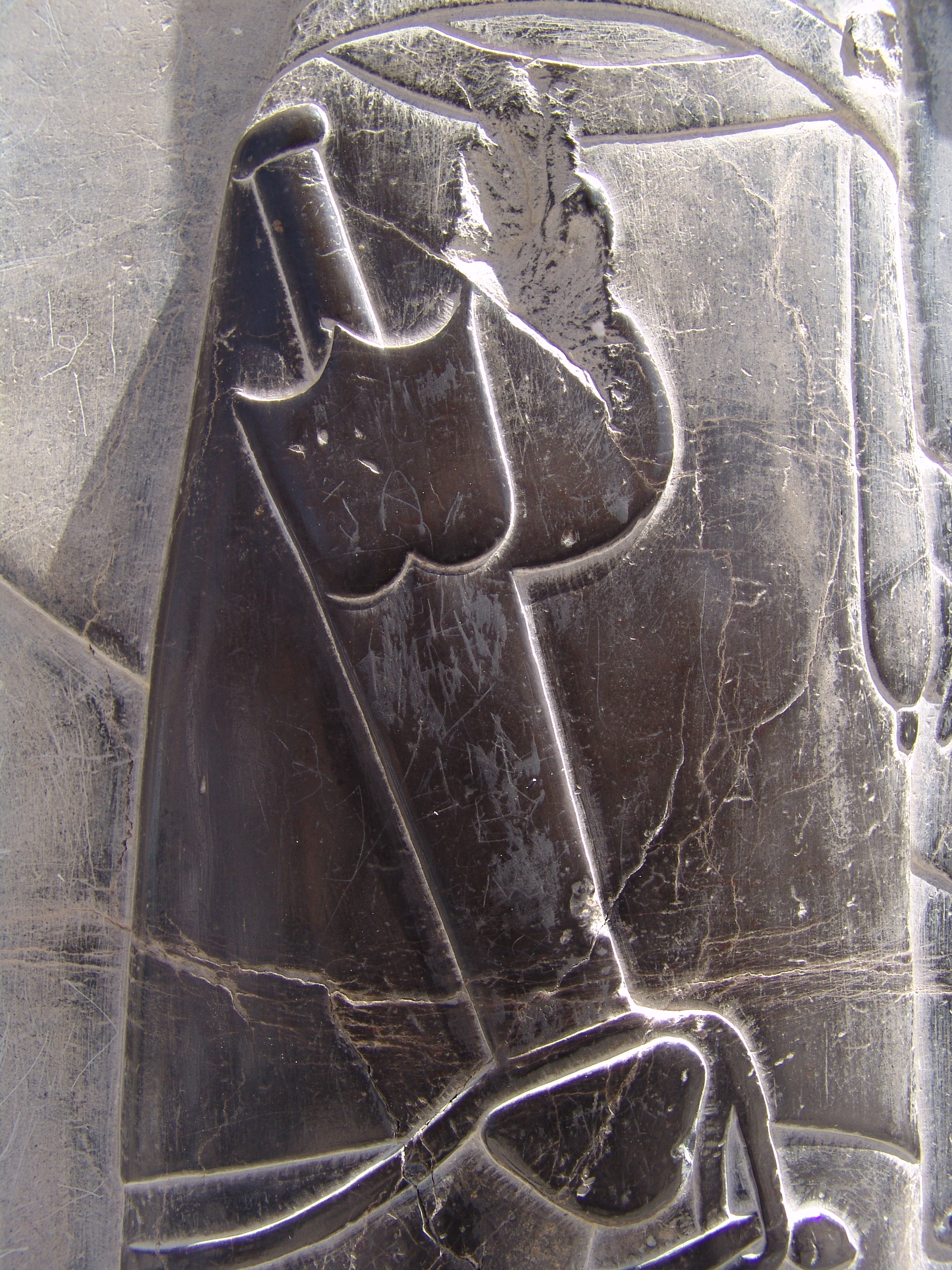
Relief of akinakes, a type of ancient dagger, worn by an Achaemenid guard in Persepolis, Iran

In ancient Egypt, daggers were usually made of copper or bronze, while royalty had gold weapons. At least since pre-dynastic Egypt, (c. 3100 BC) daggers were adorned as ceremonial objects with golden hilts and later even more ornate and varied construction. One early silver dagger was recovered with a midrib design. The 1924 opening of the tomb of Tutankhamun revealed two daggers, one with a gold blade, and one of smelted iron. It is held that mummies of the Eleventh Dynasty were buried with bronze sabres; and there is a bronze dagger of Thut-mes III. (Eighteenth Dynasty), c. B.C. 1600, and bronze armour, swords and daggers of Mene-ptah II. of the (Nineteenth Dynasty) c. B.C 1300.

Iron production did not begin until 1200 BC, and iron ore was not found in Egypt, making the iron dagger rare, and the context suggests that the iron dagger was valued on a level equal to that of its ceremonial gold counterpart. These facts, and the composition of the dagger had long suggested a meteoritic origin, however, evidence for its meteoritic origin was not entirely conclusive until June 2016 when researchers using x-ray fluorescence spectrometry confirmed similar proportions of metals (Iron, 10% nickel, and 0.6% cobalt) in a meteorite discovered in the area, deposited by an ancient meteor shower.

One of the earliest objects made of smelted iron is a dagger dating to before 2000 BC, found in a context that suggests it was treated as an ornamental object of great value. Found in a Hattic royal tomb dated about 2500 BC, at Alaca Höyük in northern Anatolia, the dagger has a smelted iron blade and a gold handle.

The artisans and blacksmiths of Iberia in what is now southern Spain and southwestern France produced various iron daggers and swords of high quality from the 5th to the 3rd century BC, in ornamentation and patterns influenced by Greek, Punic (Carthaginian), and Phoenician culture. The exceptional purity of Iberian iron and the sophisticated method of forging, which included cold hammering, produced double-edged weapons of excellent quality. One can find technologically advanced designs such as folding knives rusted among the artifacts of many Second Iberian Iron Age cremation burials or in Roman Empire excavations all around Spain and the Mediterranean. Iberian infantrymen carried several types of iron daggers, most of them based on shortened versions of double-edged swords, but the true Iberian dagger had a triangular-shaped blade. Hannibal and his Carthaginian armies later adopted Iberian daggers and swords. The Lusitanii, a pre-Celtic people dominating the lands west of Iberia (most of modern Portugal and Extremadura) successfully held off the Roman Empire for many years with a variety of innovative tactics and light weapons, including iron-bladed short spears and daggers modeled after Iberian patterns.

During the Roman Empire, legionaries were issued a pugio (from the Latin pugnō, or "fight"), a double-edged iron thrusting dagger with a blade of 7–12 in (18–30 cm). The design and fabrication of the pugio was taken directly from Iberian daggers and short swords; the Romans even adopted the triangular-bladed Iberian dagger, which they called the parazonium. Like the gladius, the pugio was most often used as a thrusting (stabbing weapon). As an extreme close-quarter combat weapon, the pugio was the Roman soldier's last line of defense. The pugio was a convenient utility knife when not in battle.

=== Middle Ages ===
The term dagger appears only in the Late Middle Ages, reflecting the fact that while the dagger had been known in antiquity, it had disappeared during the Early Middle Ages, replaced by the hewing knife or seax.

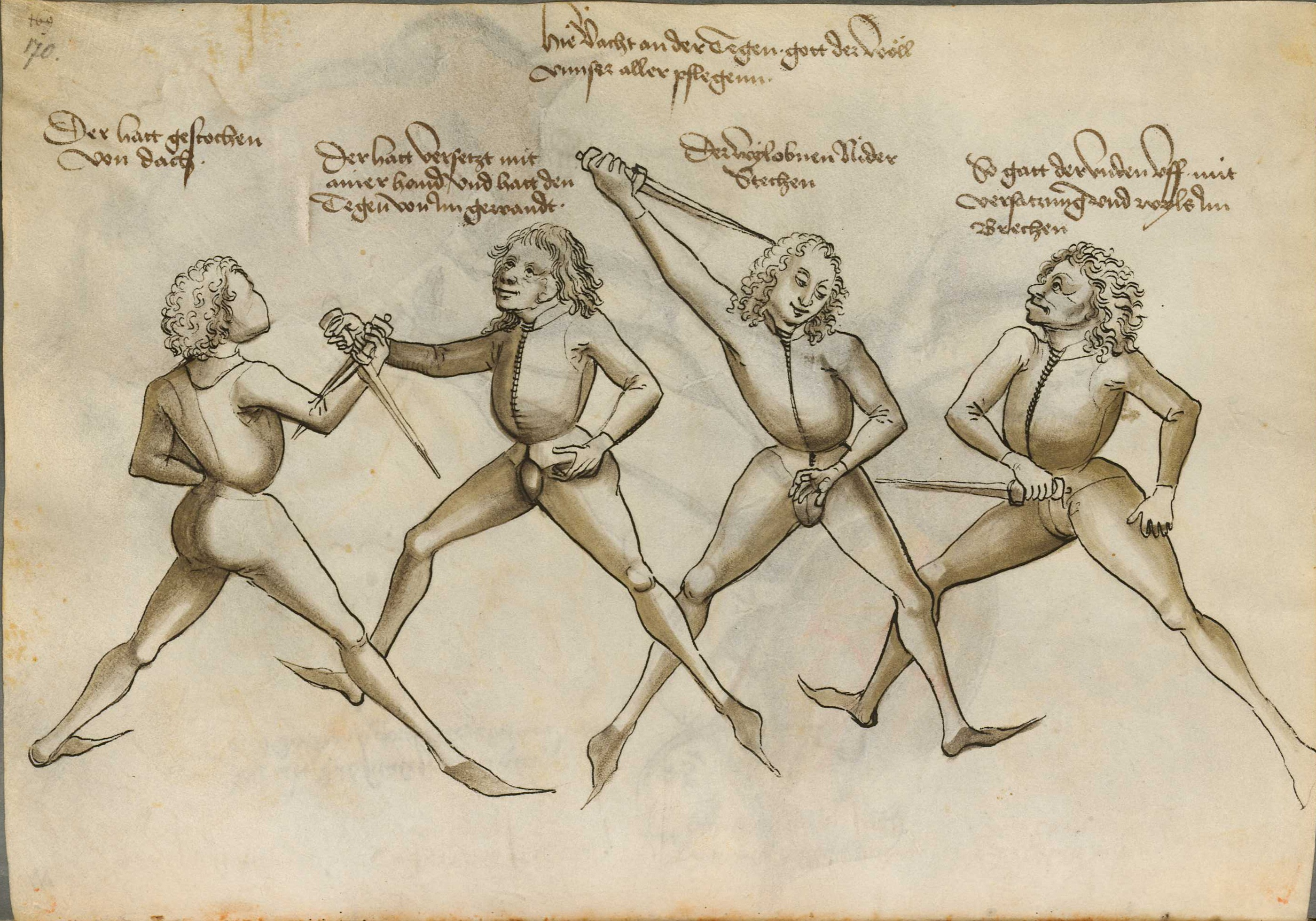
Depiction of combat with the dagger (degen) in Hans Talhoffer (1467)

The dagger reappeared in the 12th century as the "knightly dagger", or more properly, cross-hilt or quillon dagger, and was developed into a common arm and tool for civilian use by the late medieval period.

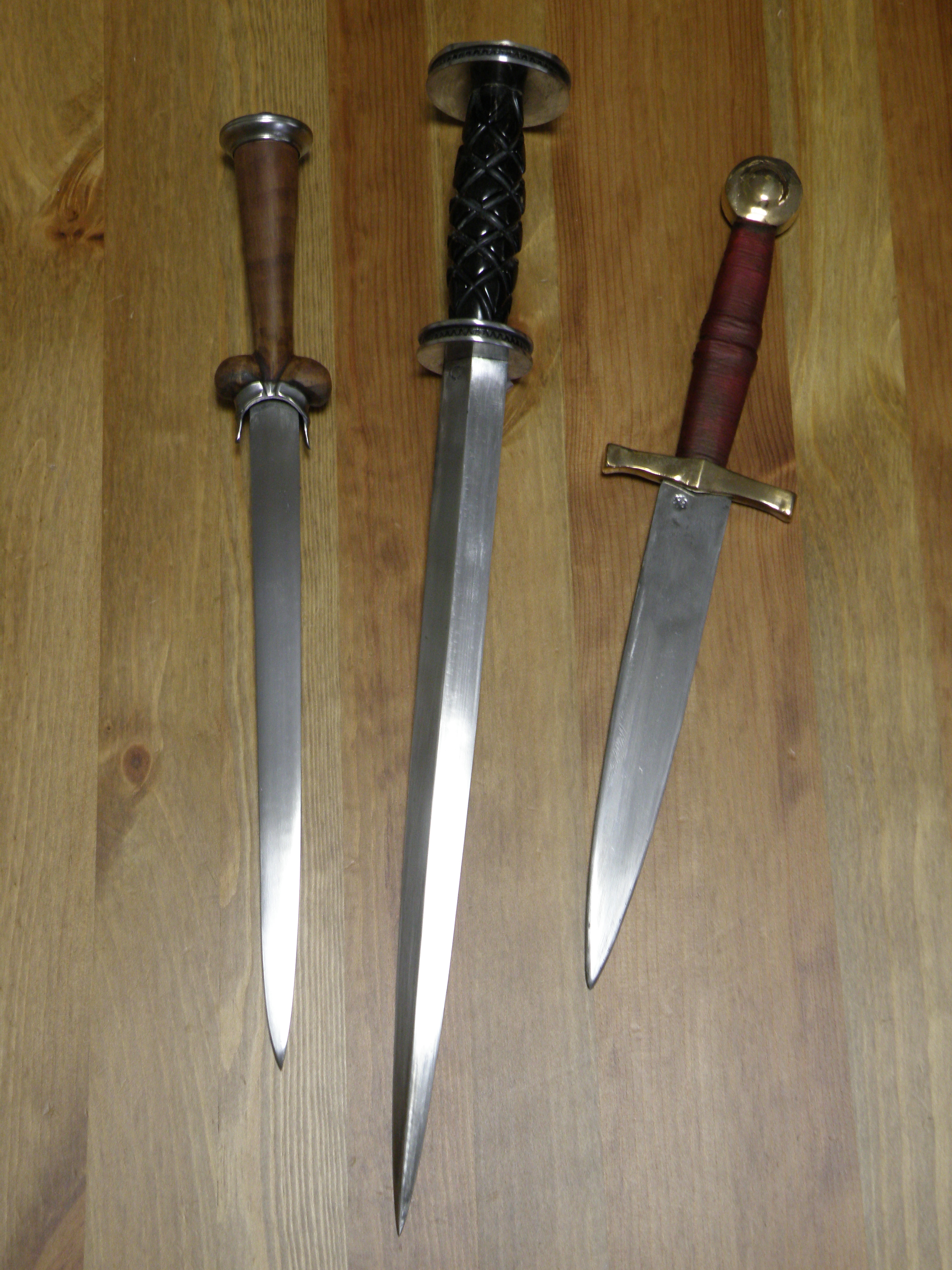
Modern reproductions of medieval daggers. From left to right: Ballock dagger, Rondel dagger, and a Quillon dagger

The earliest known depiction of a cross-hilt dagger is the so-called "Guido relief" inside the Grossmünster of Zürich (c. 1120). Some depictions of the fully developed cross-hilt dagger are found in the Morgan Bible (c. 1240). Many of these cross-hilt daggers resemble miniature swords, with cross guards and pommels very similar in form to swords of the period. Others, however, are not an exact match to known sword designs, having for instance pommel caps, large hollow star shaped pommels on so-called "Burgundian Heraldic daggers" or antenna style cross and pommel, reminiscent of Hallstatt era daggers. The cross-hilt type persisted well into the Renaissance

The Old French term dague appears to have referred to these weapons in the 13th century, alongside other terms such as poignal and basilard. The Middle English dagger is used from the 1380s.

During this time, the dagger was often employed in the role of a secondary defense weapon in close combat. The knightly dagger evolved into the larger baselard knife in the 14th century. During the 14th century, it became fairly common for knights to fight on foot to strengthen the infantry defensive line. This necessitated more use of daggers. At Agincourt (1415) archers used them to dispatch dismounted knights by thrusting the narrow blades through helmet vents and other apertures. The baselard was considered an intermediate between a short sword and a long dagger, and became popular also as a civilian weapon. Sloane MS. 2593 (c. 1400) records a song satirizing the use of oversized baselard knives as fashion accessories. Weapons of this sort called anelace, somewhere between a large dagger and a short sword, were much in use in 14th century England as civilians' accoutrements, worn "suspended by a ring from the girdle".

In the Late Middle Ages, knives with blade designs that emphasized thrusting attacks, such as the stiletto, became increasingly popular, and some thrusting knives commonly referred to as 'daggers' ceased to have a cutting edge. This was a response to the deployment of heavy armour, such as maille and plate armour, where cutting attacks were ineffective and focus was on thrusts with narrow blades to punch through mail or aim at armour plate intersections (or the eye slits of the helmet visor). The shape of their hilt sometimes classes these late medieval thrusting weapons as either roundel, bollock or ear daggers. The term dagger is coined in this time, as are the Early Modern German equivalents dolch (tolch) and degen (tegen). In the German school of fencing, Johannes Liechtenauer (Ms. 3227a) and his successors (specifically Andres Lignizer in Cod. 44 A 8) taught fighting with the dagger.

In some respects, these techniques resemble modern knife fighting but emphasize thrusting strokes almost exclusively, instead of slashes and cuts. When used offensively, a standard attack frequently employed the reverse or icepick grip, stabbing downward with the blade to increase thrust and penetrative force. This was done primarily because the blade point frequently had to penetrate or push apart an opponent's steel chain mail or plate armour to inflict an injury. The disadvantage of employing the medieval dagger in this manner was that it could easily be blocked by various techniques, most notably by a block with the weaponless arm while simultaneously attacking with a weapon held in the right hand. Another disadvantage was the reduction in effective blade reach to the opponent when using a reverse grip. As the wearing of armour fell out of favor, dagger fighting techniques began to evolve, emphasizing the use of the dagger with a conventional or forward grip. In contrast, the reverse or icepick grip was retained when attacking an unsuspecting opponent from behind, such as in an assassination.

=== Renaissance and early modern period ===
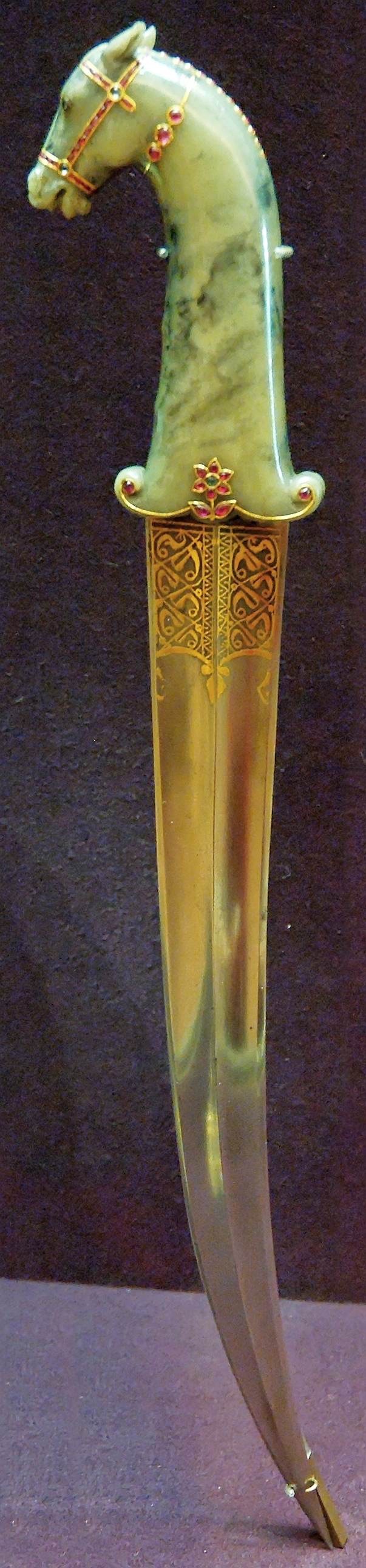
Mogul dagger known as the Khanjar, Louvre.

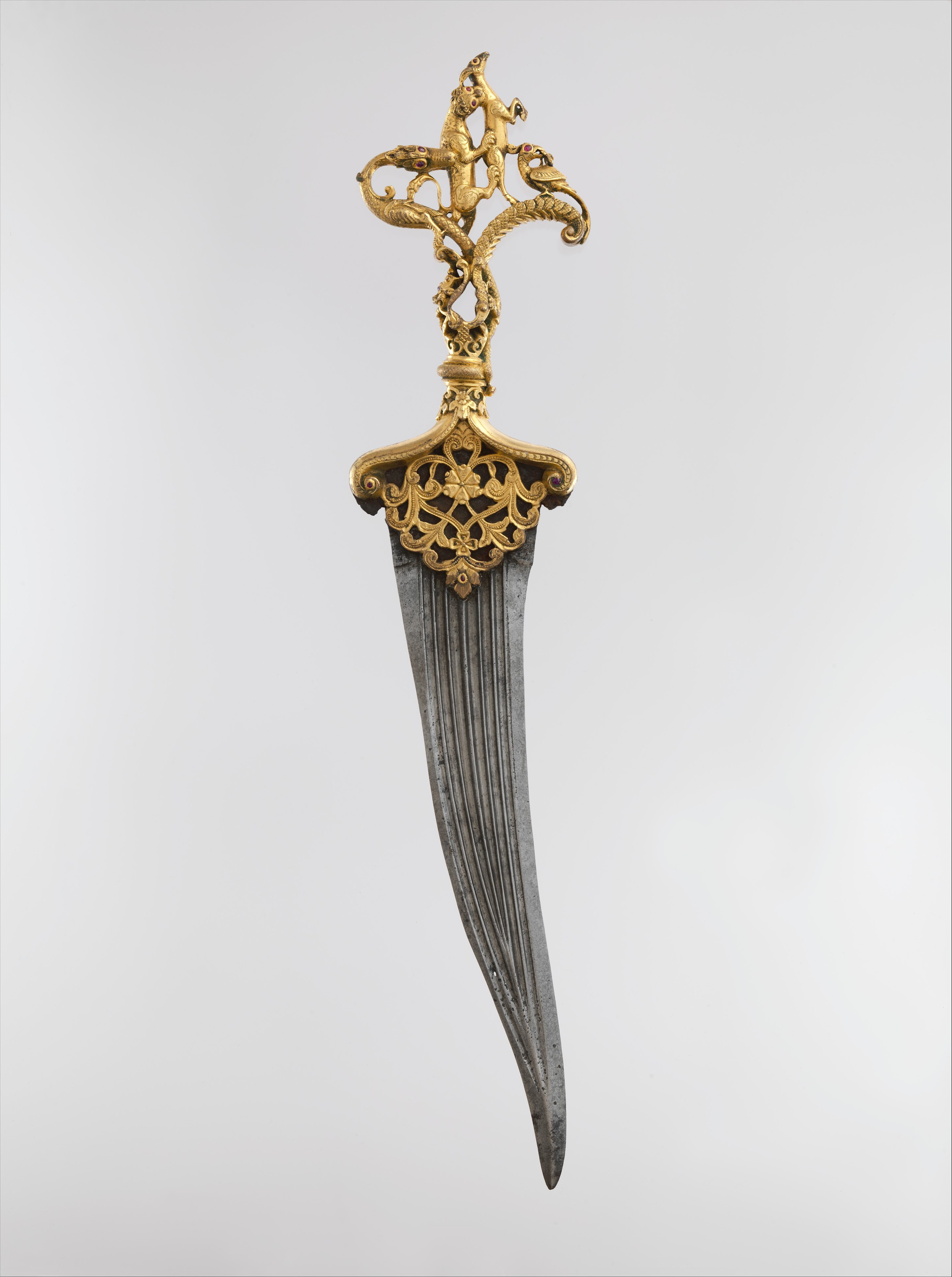
Dagger with Zoomorphic Hilt possibly from the Deccan Sultanates, c. 16th century, Metropolitan Museum of Art

The dagger was very popular as a fencing and personal defense weapon in 17th and 18th century Spain, where it was referred to as the daga or puñal. During the Renaissance Age the dagger was used as part of everyday dress, and daggers were the only weapon commoners were allowed to carry on their person. In English, the terms poniard and dirk are loaned during the late 16th to early 17th century, the latter in the spelling dork, durk (presumably via Low German, Dutch or Scandinavian dolk, dolch, ultimately from a West Slavic tulich), the modern spelling dirk dating to 18th-century Scots.

Beginning in the 17th century, another form of dagger—the plug bayonet and later the socket bayonet—was used to convert muskets and other longarms into spears by mounting them on the barrel. They were periodically used for eating; the arm was also used for various other tasks such as mending boots, house repairs, and farm jobs. The final function of the dagger was as an obvious and ostentatious means of enhancing a man's apparel, conforming to fashion which dictated that all men carried them.

=== Modern period (19th–21st century) ===
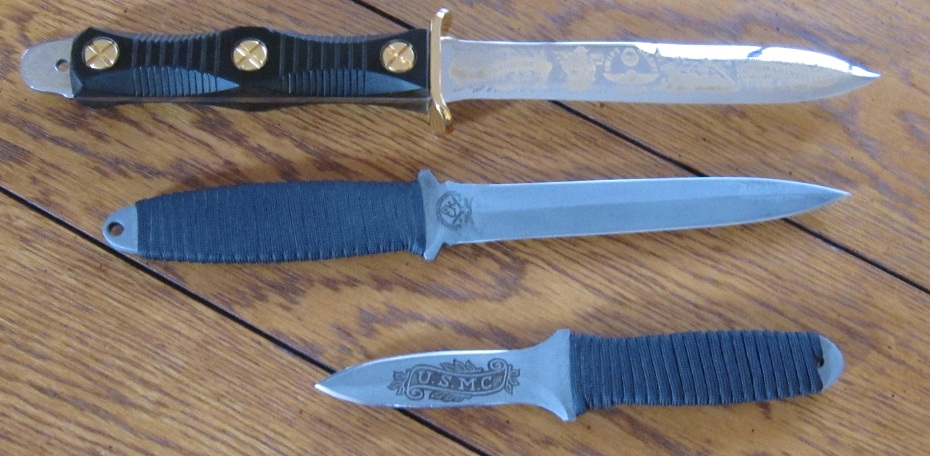
20th-century daggers

WW1 trench warfare caused daggers and fighting knives to come back in play. They also replaced the sabres worn by officers, which were too long and clumsy for trench warfare. They were worn with pride as a sign of having served front-line duty.

Daggers achieved public notoriety in the 20th century as ornamental uniform regalia during the Fascist dictatorships of Mussolini's Italy and Hitler's Germany. Several other countries, including Japan, have used dress daggers, but never to the same extent. As combat equipment, they were carried by many infantry and commando forces during the Second World War. British Commando and other elite units were issued an exceedingly slender dagger, the Fairbairn–Sykes fighting knife, developed by William E. Fairbairn and Eric A. Sykes from real-life close-combat experiences gained while serving on the Shanghai Municipal Police Force. The F-S dagger proved very popular with the commandos, who used it primarily for sentry elimination. Some units of the U.S. Marine Corps Raiders in the Pacific were issued a similar fighting dagger, the Marine Raider stiletto, though this modified design proved less than successful when used in the type of knife combat encountered in the Pacific theater due to this version using inferior materials and manufacturing techniques.

During the Vietnam War, the Gerber Mark II, designed by US Army Captain Bud Holzman and Al Mar, was a popular fighting knife pattern privately purchased by many U.S. soldiers and marines who served in that war.

Aside from military forces, most daggers are no longer carried openly, but concealed in clothing. One of the more popular forms of the concealable dagger is the boot knife. The boot knife is nothing more than a shortened dagger that is compact enough to be worn on the lower leg, usually using a sheath clipped or strapped to a boot or other footwear.

== Cultural symbolism ==
The dagger is symbolically ambiguous. For some cultures and military organizations, the dagger symbolizes courage and daring in combat.

However, daggers may be associated with deception or treachery due to the ease of concealment and the surprise the user could inflict upon an unsuspecting victim. Indeed, many assassinations have been carried out with the use of a dagger, including that of Julius Caesar. A cloak and dagger attack is one in which a deceitful, traitorous, or concealed enemy attacks a person. Some have noted a phallic association between daggers and the succession of royal dynasties in British literature.

In European artwork, daggers were sometimes associated with Hecate, the Ancient Greek goddess of witchcraft.

The social stigma of the dagger originates in its periodic use in the commission of disreputable and murderous attacks, from the 44 BC assassination of Julius Caesar to the use of the stiletto dagger by the Black Hand of early 20th century America. Consequently, it developed a public association with surprise assaults by criminals and murderers intent on stabbing unsuspecting victims. To this day, criminal codes of many nations specifically ban the carrying of the dagger as a prohibited weapon.

== Modern use ==
Militaries use the dagger as a close combat and ceremonial arm.

The U.S. Army Special Operations Command unit patch, a U.S. Army emblem with dagger

Many nations use the dagger pattern in the form of the bayonet. Daggers are commonly used as part of the insignias of elite military units or special forces, such as the US Army Special Operations Command, the US Army Special Forces, or the Commando Dagger patch for those who have completed the British All Arms Commando Course.

== Art knives ==
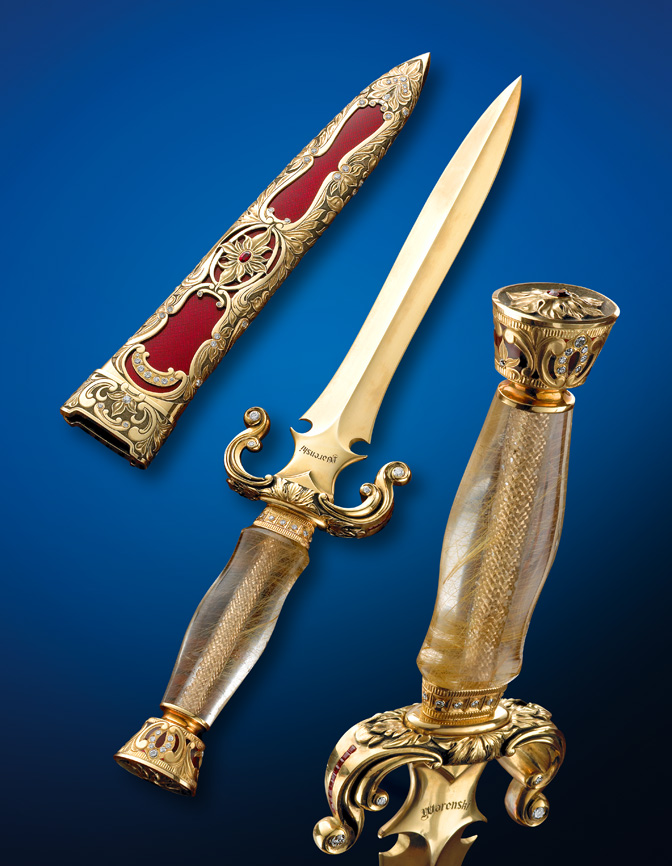
Buster Warenski dagger

Daggers are a popular form of what is known as the "art knife", due in part to the symmetry of the blade. One of the knives required of an American Bladesmith Society Mastersmith is the construction of an "art knife" or a "European style" dagger.

== See also ==
- List of daggers
- Dagger (mark) – Typographical symbol (†)
- Tantō – Japanese dagger
- Kris – Weapon from Maritime Southeast Asia
- Kirpan – Blade worn by Sikhs
