= Morocco leather =

Type of soft, pliable leather

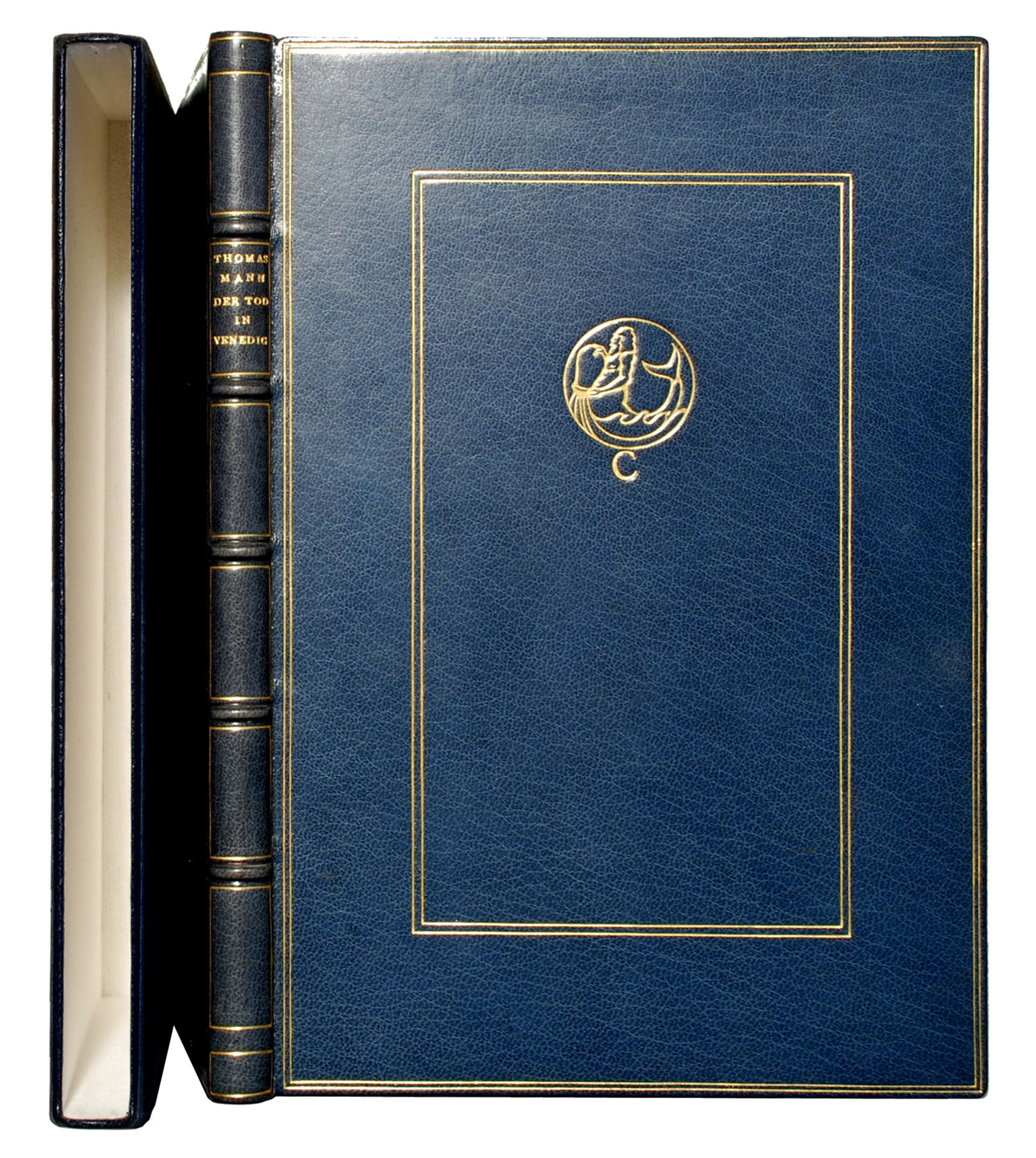
Deluxe edition of Thomas Mann's novel Der Tod in Venedig in full Morocco binding, showing its typical vein

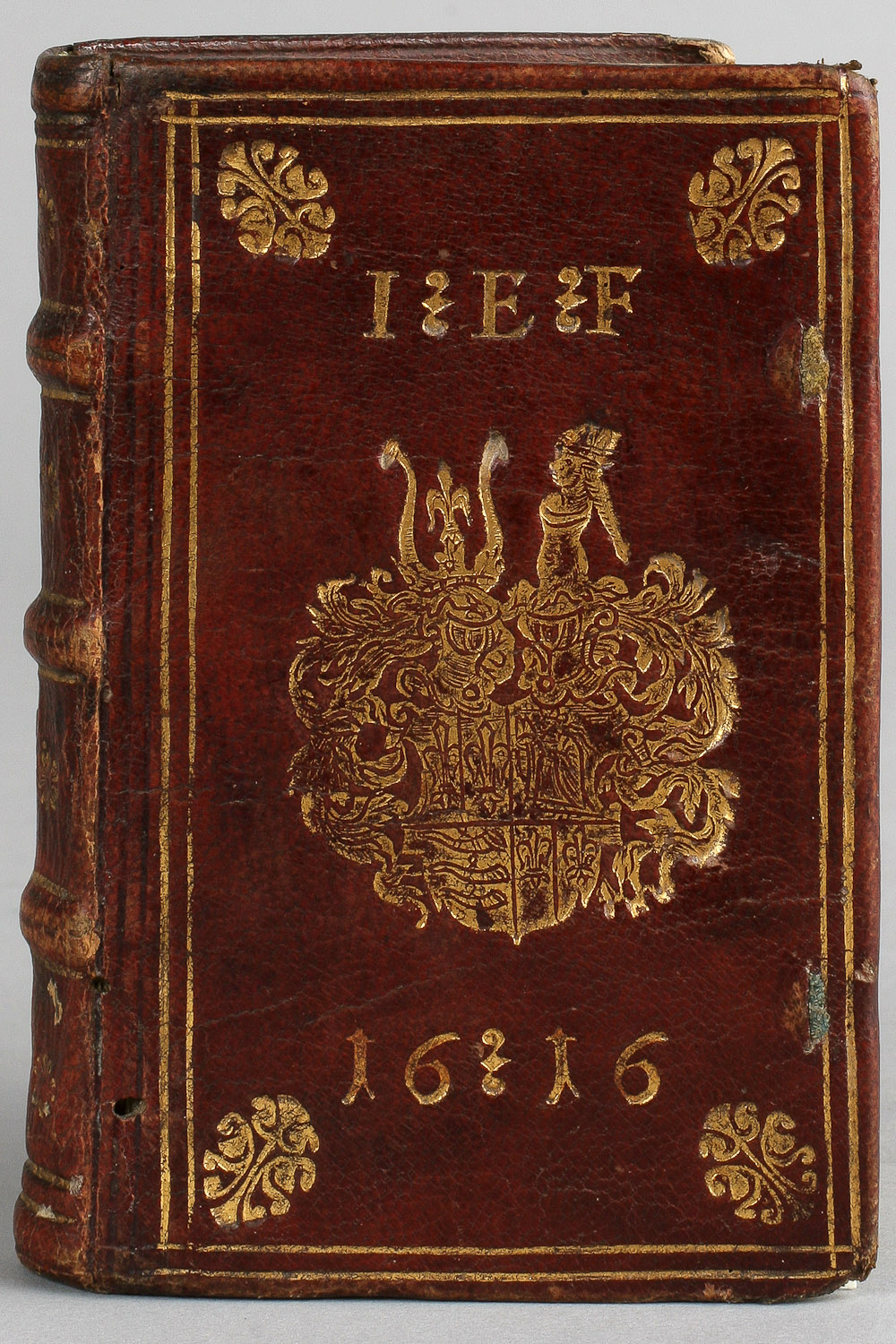
A red morocco binding with the Fugger arms (Bibliothèque-médiathèque de Nancy)

Morocco leather (also known as Levant, the French Maroquin, Turkey, or German Saffian from Safi, a Moroccan town famous for leather) is a vegetable-tanned leather known for its softness, pliability, and ability to take color. It has been widely used in the manufacture of gloves and the uppers of ladies' shoes and men's low cut shoes, but is commonly associated with wallets, linings for fine luggage, and bookbindings.

Despite its name, Morocco was typically not the original source of the leather. Some of the highest quality Morocco leather, usually goat skin, used in book binding was sourced from Northern Nigeria (particularly from the Hausa city-states of Kano, Katsina, and Zazzau) and Anatolia (modern day Turkey). First known production of morocco leather is attributed to pre-11th century Moors, in which alum tanned morocco leather was stained pink.

The finest grades of Morocco leather are goatskin, but by the late 19th century other skins often were substituted in practice, particularly sheepskin and split calfskin. For example, French Morocco is a variety made of sheepskin. The tanning process varied widely, but the traditional tanning material was sumac. The traditional tanning process was skilled and elaborate; according to the application, the preparation either would aim for a carefully smoothed finish, or would bring up the grain in various patterns such as straight-grained, pebble-grained, or in particular, in a bird's-eye pattern. Morocco leather is nearly always dyed, traditionally most often red or black, but green, brown or other colors also were available, and in modern times there is no special constraint on color.

While it was not common in England and in more northern parts of Europe until the 17th century, it has been established that Morocco leather was used in Italy pre-1600, as goat leather was more common there. Morocco leather is valued in Western countries for its use in luxury bookbindings because of its strength, suppleness, and because it enhanced any gilding. The leather tends to be more famous than the breed of goat that originally produced it. The leather is sourced from the Sokoto Red breed, which is indigenous to Guinea and Sudan Savannah of Nigeria and Maradi Region in Republic of Niger.

== Miscellany ==
The shotel sword and gasha shield of Ethiopia were often made using Morocco leather

The song "(We're Off on the) Road to Morocco" sung by Bing Crosby and Bob Hope includes the line "like Webster's dictionary we're Morocco bound".
