= Billao =

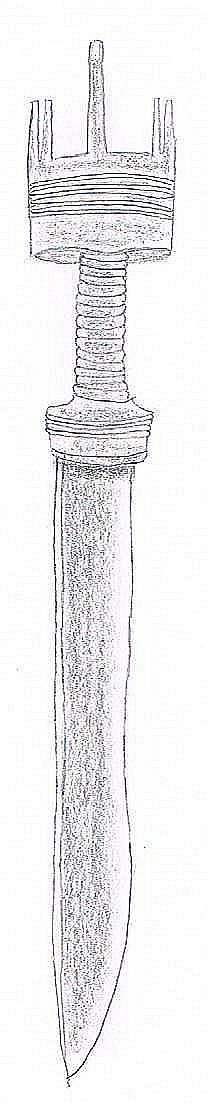
- A billao shortsword.
- Type: Shortsword or long dagger
- Place of origin: Horn of Africa

Service history
- Used by: Somali
- Wars: Dervish resistance (1896–1920)

Specifications
- Mass: 9 oz (260 g)
- Length: 17 to 25 in (43 to 64 cm)
- Width: (2.5 in (6.4 cm) (blade)
- Blade type: iron or steel; pointed, double-edged
- Hilt type: horn
- Scabbard/sheath: sheepskin

A billao (Somali: billaawe), also known as a bilaawe, is a horn-hilted Somali shortsword or long dagger depending on blade length. It served most notably as a close-quarters weapon in the Dervish State, at the turn of the 20th century, as well as northern sultanates around that same time period.

== History ==
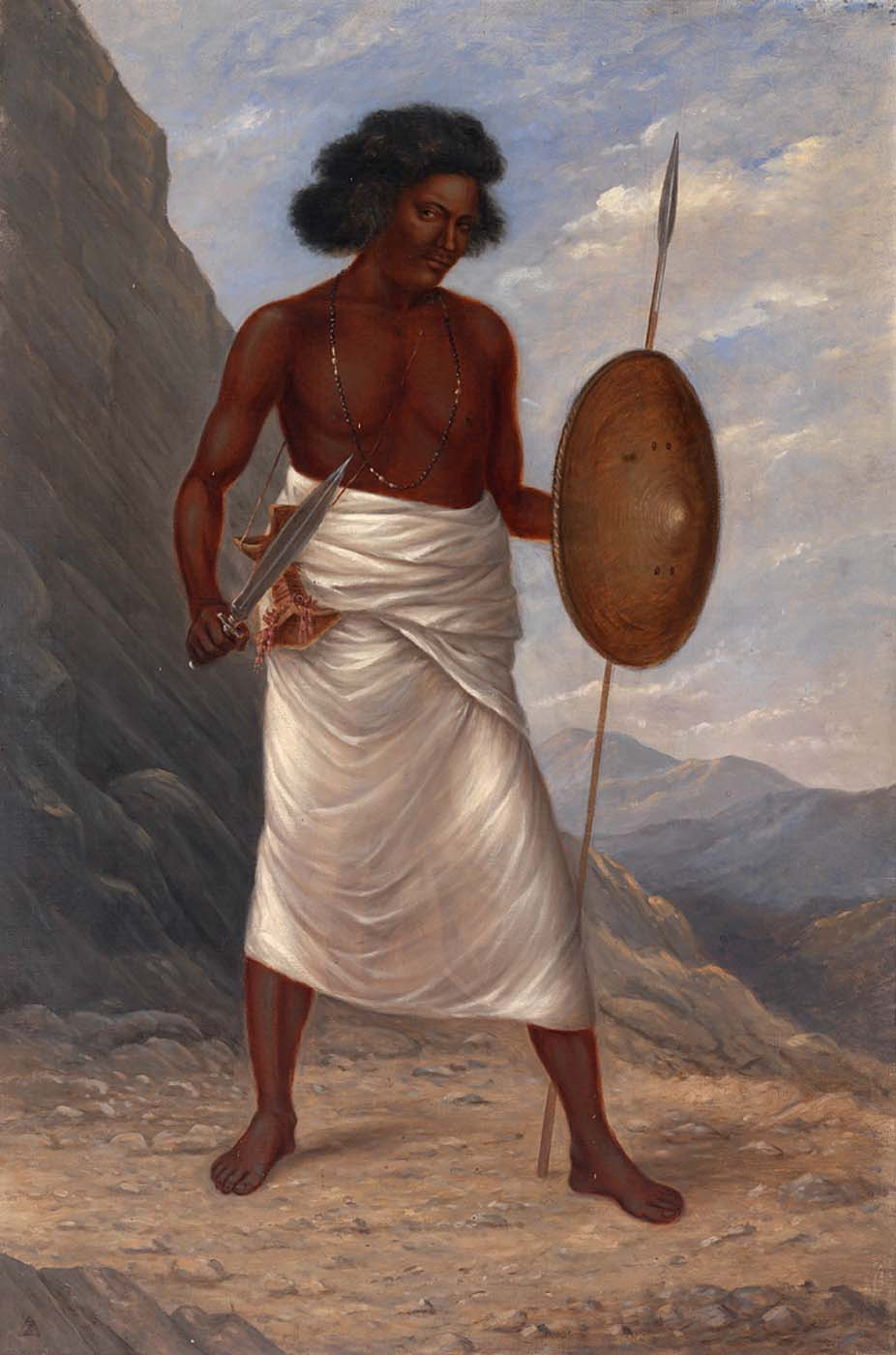
Somali warrior with a spear and billao

The billao is thought to be a traditionally old weapon as evidenced by ancient rock engravings at Bur Eibi, an archaeological site in southern Somalia. These are believed to be an early depiction of the unique design of the blade, in particular the hilt in which no other parallel is found. Revoil believed that these were the blades depicted in the Deir-el-Bahri wall paintings on the belt of Punt chiefs.

== Features ==
The billao has a double-edged, leaf-shaped, asymmetrical blade and a three-pronged pommel. One-pronged pommels with the metal tang protruding out from the center of the hilt have been reported. Together, the grip and pommel are 6.75 in (17.1 cm) in circumference. The billao's blade is made of iron or steel, and is 10.5 in (27 cm)" long and 2.5 in (6.4 cm)" wide. Though other horn types are also used, the handle is typically made from the horn of buffalo. In total, the dagger is 17.25 in (43.8 cm) long. The sheath is made of sheepskin, and the sword is worn on a belt around the waist.

== Other variants ==
The longer version of the billao can either be a straight sword or have a curved blade similar to a sabre. It is also sometimes referred to as sayf. Despite the difference in length, it still retains the hilt shape.

== Gallery ==
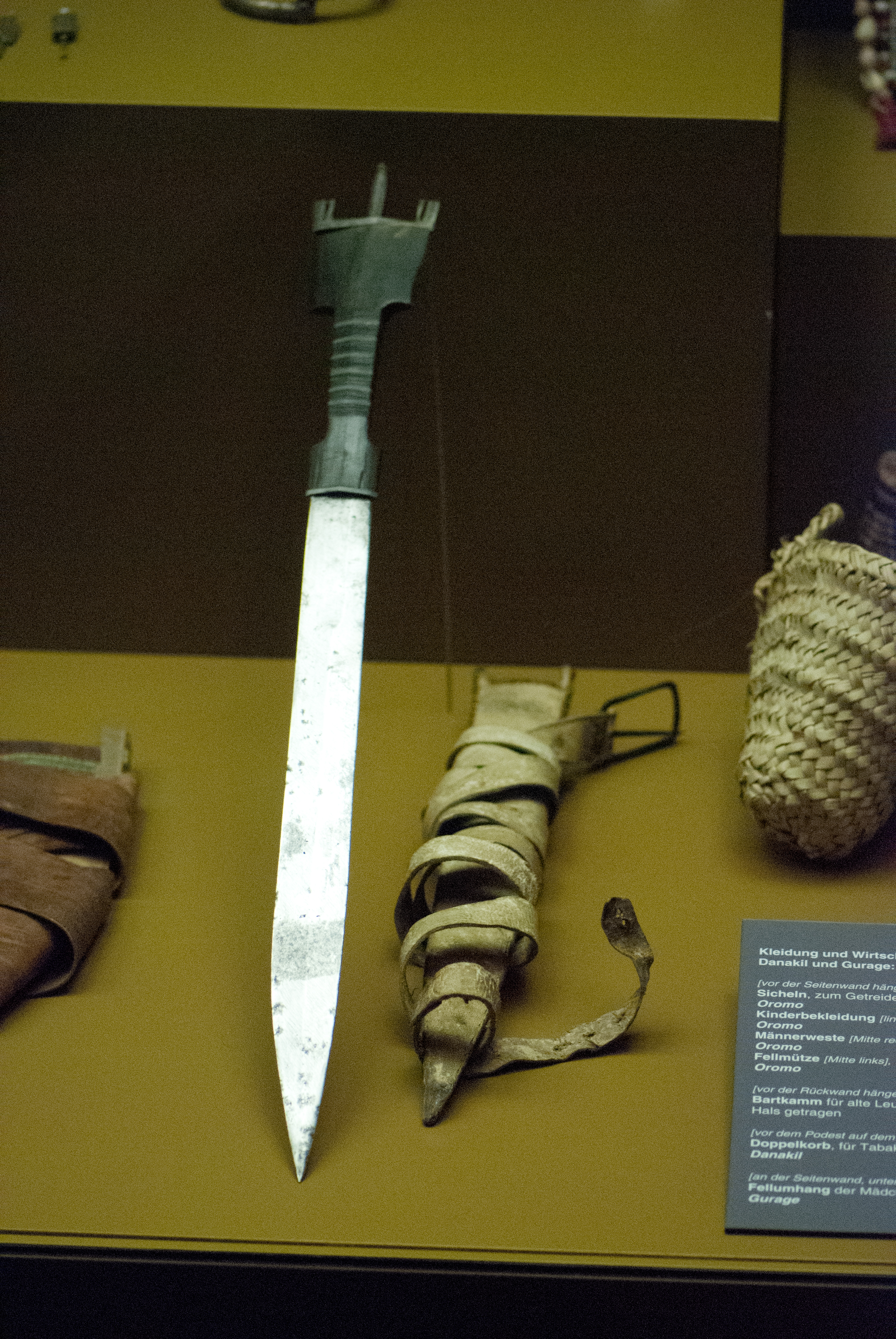

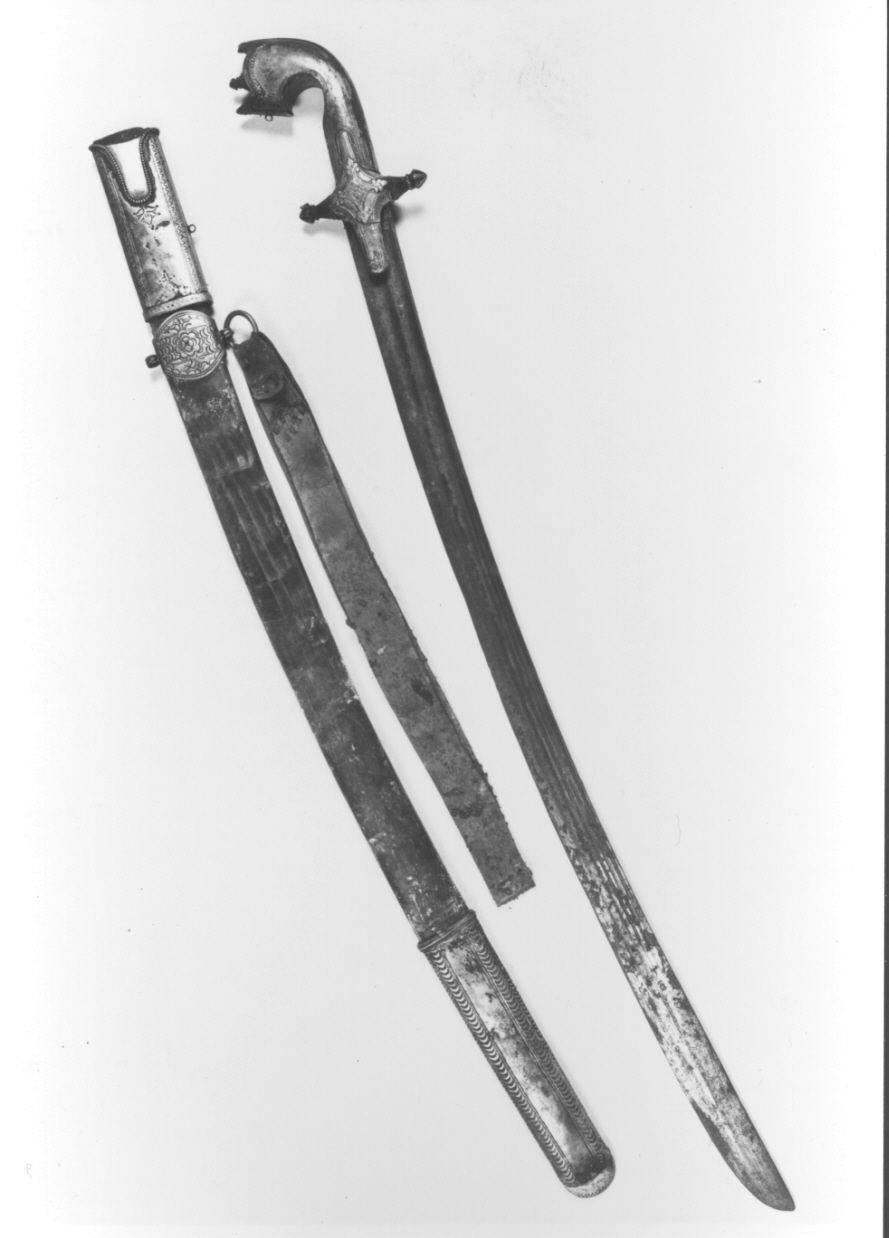

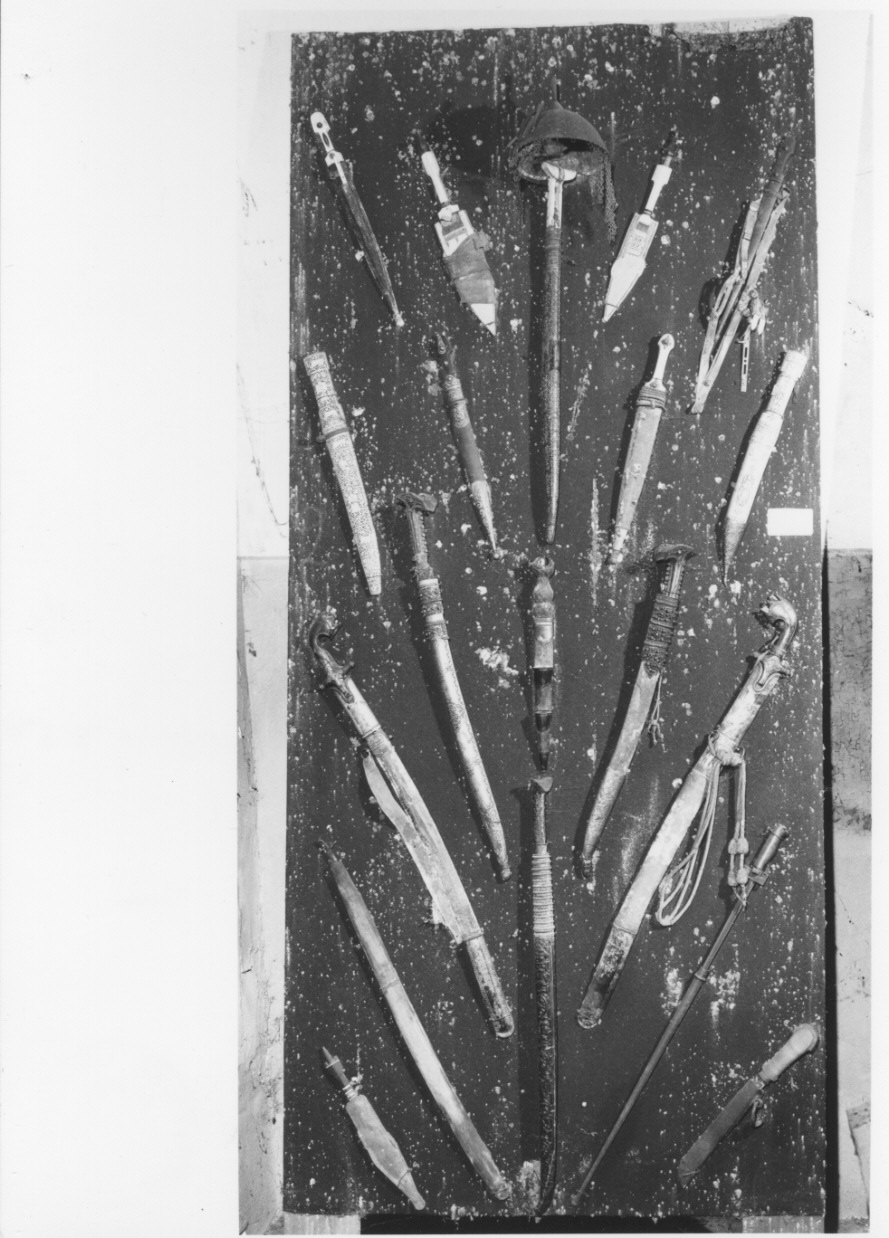

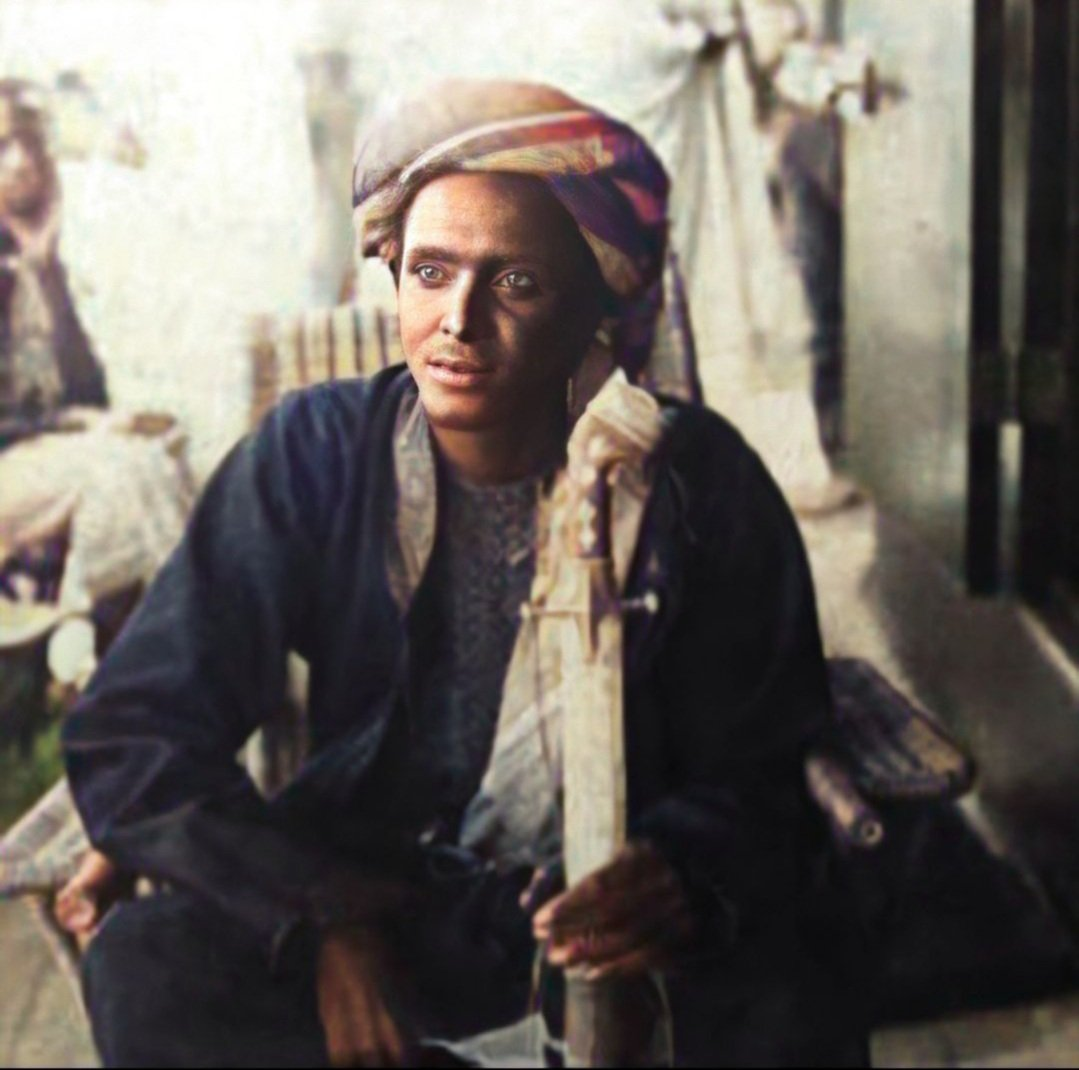

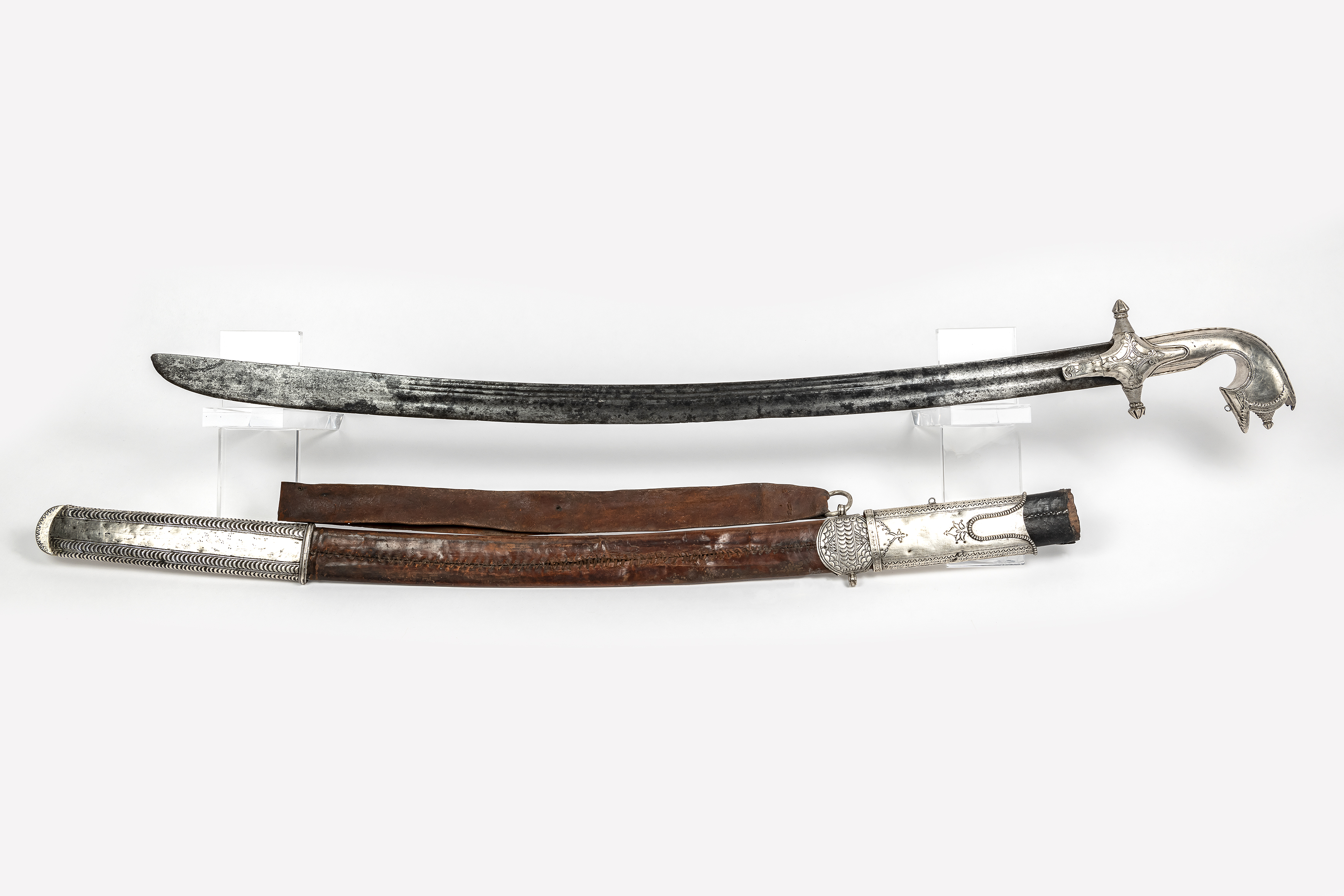

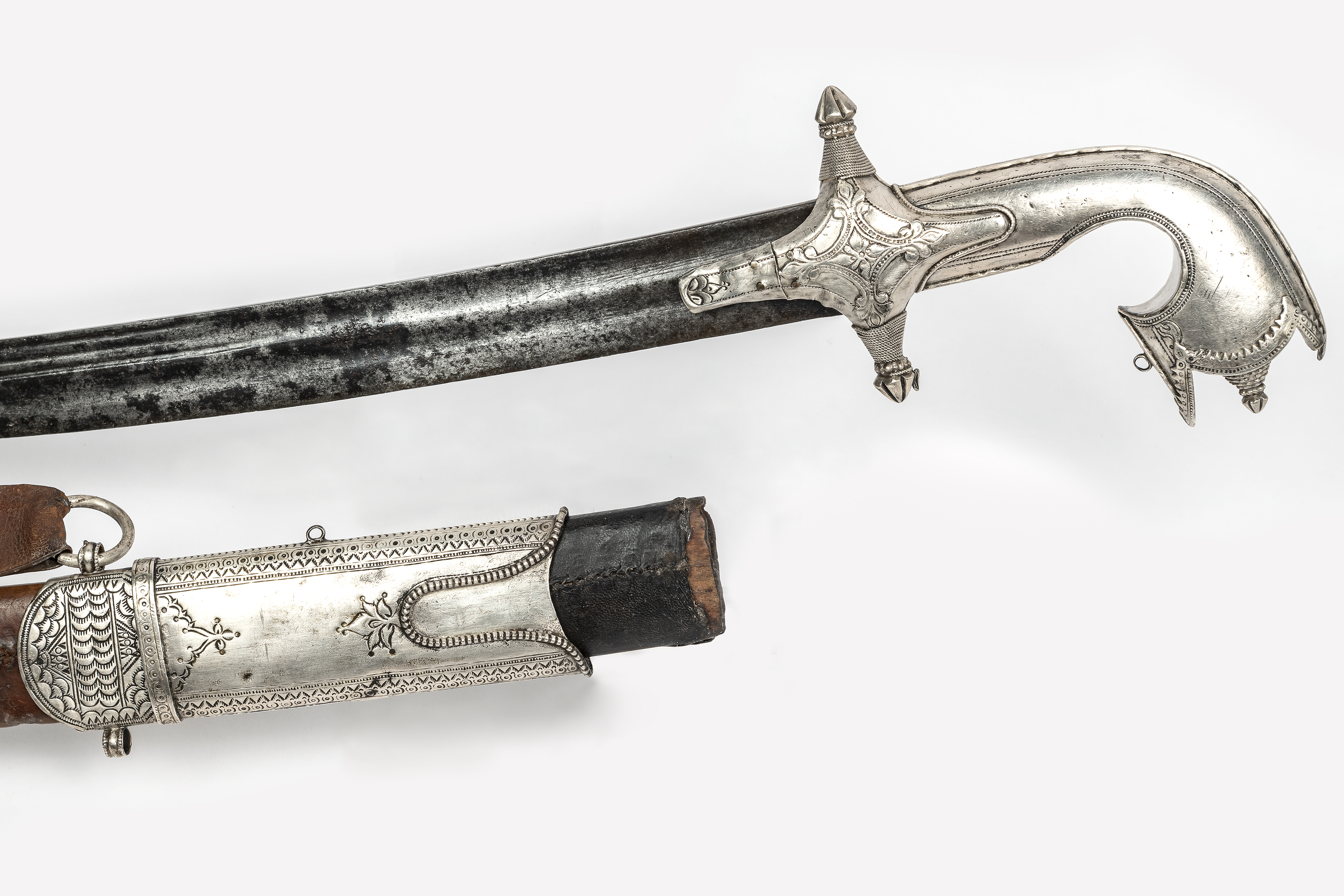

== See also ==
- Qolxad, the traditional Somali and Afar dagger
- List of swords
