= Khanjali =

Traditional knife from the Caucasus

Khanjali (Qama)
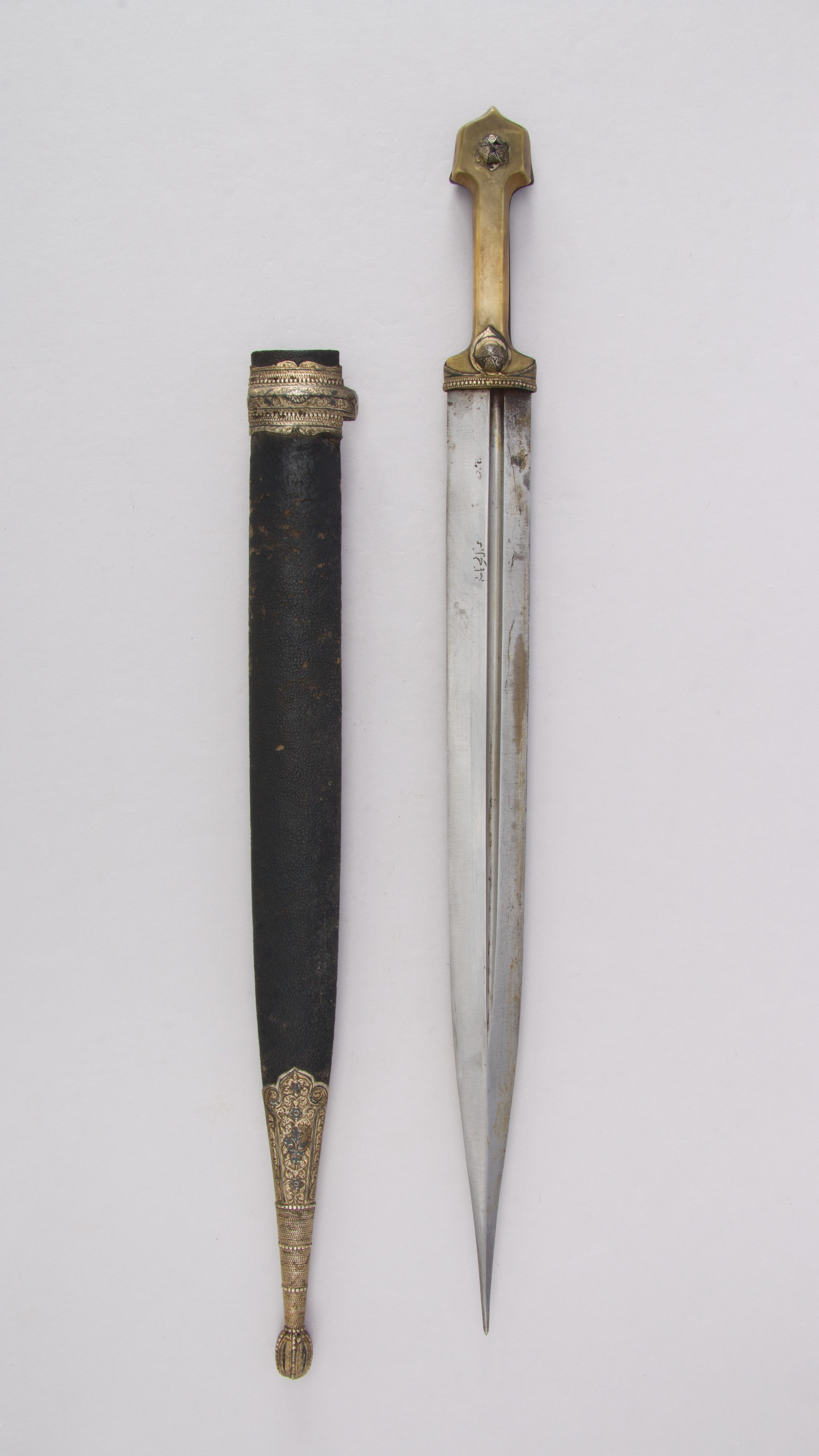
- Caucasian dagger, Metropolitan Museum of Art
- Type: Dagger
- Place of origin: Caucasus

Specifications
- Blade length: approx. 40–50 cm (16–20 in)
- Blade type: Straight Double edged, Curved Single edged (Bebut)
- Hilt type: Single-handed swept
- Scabbard/sheath: wood and leather, brass, gold and silver.

Khanjali (Abkhaz: Аҩҽы/Кама; Adyghe: къамэ; Avar: Ханжар; Armenian: խանջալ; Azerbaijani: Qəmə/xəncər; Chechen: шаьлта; Dargin: ханжал, Georgian: ხანჯალი; Ingush: шалта; Lezgin: Гапур; Ossetian: Хъама) also known as a kindjal, is a double-edged dagger used in the Caucasus. The shape of the weapon is similar to that of the ancient Roman gladius, the Scottish dirk and the ancient Greek xiphos. Inhabitants of Caucasus have used the Kindjal as a secondary weapon since the 18th century.

Such daggers and their scabbards are often highly engraved with gold or silver designs, and sometimes include embedded gemstones. The scabbard will generally feature a ballpoint extension on the tip, and the handle is usually made of materials such as wood or ivory.

== Name ==
- In Georgian it can be called khanjali or satevari.
- In Dagestan it is called khanjali.
- In Azerbaijan it is called khanjar.
- In Armenia it is called khanchal.
- In Chechnya/Ingushetia it is shalta.
- In Circassia and Ossetia it is called kama (qama).

Compare the standard Russian-language word (probably Turkic-sourced) for "dagger": Russian: кинжал (kinzhal).

As the Kabardian linguist Shagirov writes, the name of the dagger came from the Turkic languages (see, for example, Turkish kama "dagger", Karachay-Balkar qama "dagger").

== History ==
The Kindjal has its origins in the late 18th century. Although similar straight daggers were used by Caucasians in ancient times, they eventually lost their popularity and gave way to curved daggers, similar to ones found in the Ottoman Empire and Persia. Based on archeological evidence, the Kindjal itself dates from roughly the late 18th century. By the mid-19th century, it had achieved wide popularity and was carried by almost everyone in most parts of the Caucasus.

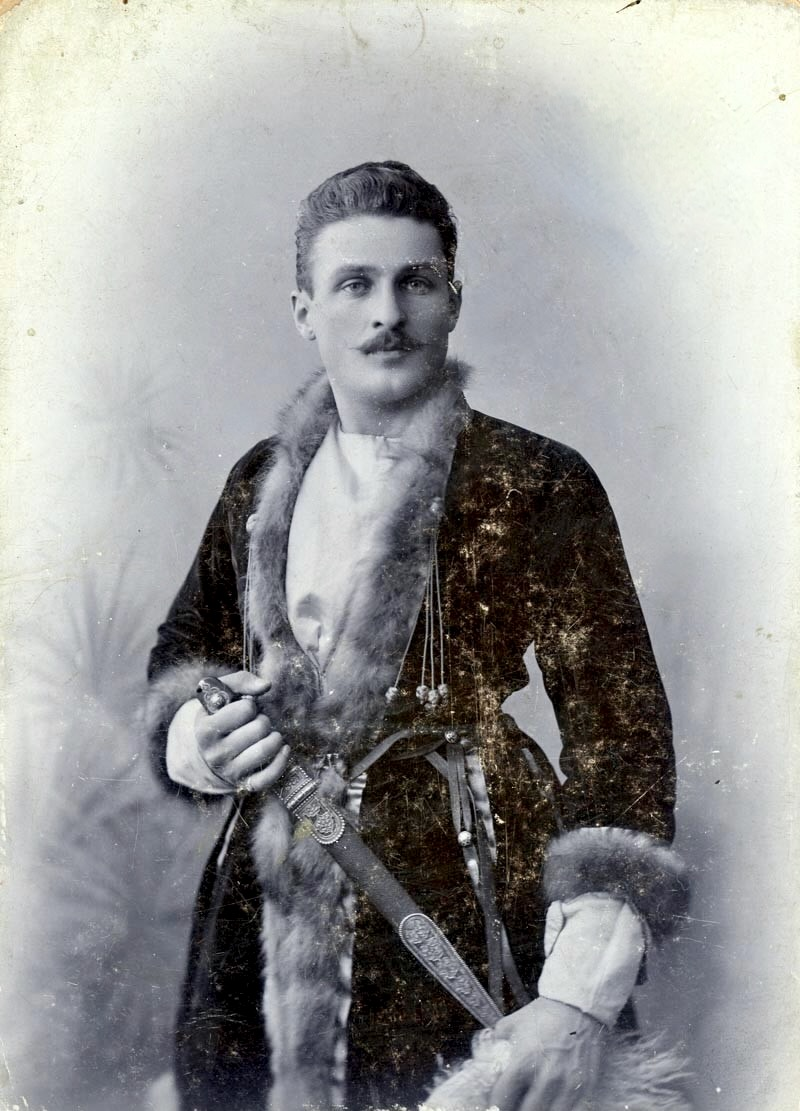
Georgian military leader Leo Kereselidze holding a ceremonial khanjali

In the 19th century, the production of Kindjals was at a high level in the South Caucasus. Tbilisi was especially distinguished and well-known, from where such tools were supplied to other mountain peoples of the Caucasus, as well as Iran and other eastern regions countries. As Tbilisi was the capital of Caucasus at that time, both the client and the master were able to gather in one place. In Tbilisi, the craft was characterized by a division of labor based on ethnic lines. Most Tbilisi Kindjals were fitted and decorated by ethnic Armenian jewelers, while the blades themselves mostly bear Muslim signatures, likely belonging to Dagestani or Persian bladesmiths. In the first half of the 19th century, the Elizarashvili family was one of the most famous blacksmithing families not only in the Caucasus but also in Iran, Turkey and Russia. Giorgi Elizarashvili inherited the family secrets of blacksmithing from his ancestors and passed on his knowledge and skills to his sons – Efrem and Karaman. The family maintained strictly the secrets of processing steel, but in 1828 Karaman shared the secret by the order of the Russian emperor Nicholas I, and in return received a gold medal (with Anna ribbon) and 1000 Chervonets (high-value gold coins). Other famous masters of Caucasian arms included the Armenians Osip Papov, Gevork Purunsuzov, and Khachatur Beburov, the Dagestani Bazalai, and the Chechen Chilla Murtazaliev.

Besides being a status symbol and weapon, many social traditions were associated with the Kindjal. The usage of Georgian Khanjali/Satevari in pre-marital relationships, termed as "sts'orp'roba (სწორპრობა)," was a Khevsur custom. During the night, a young couple may lie together with a Khanjali between them. Sexual activity between the two was prohibited. Anyone who disobeyed this rule was put to death. The Kindjal was also popularly used while dancing.

== See also ==
- Combat knife
- Khanjar
- Gladius

== See also ==
- Qama - a similar weapon
