= Khanjar =

Traditional dagger originating from Oman

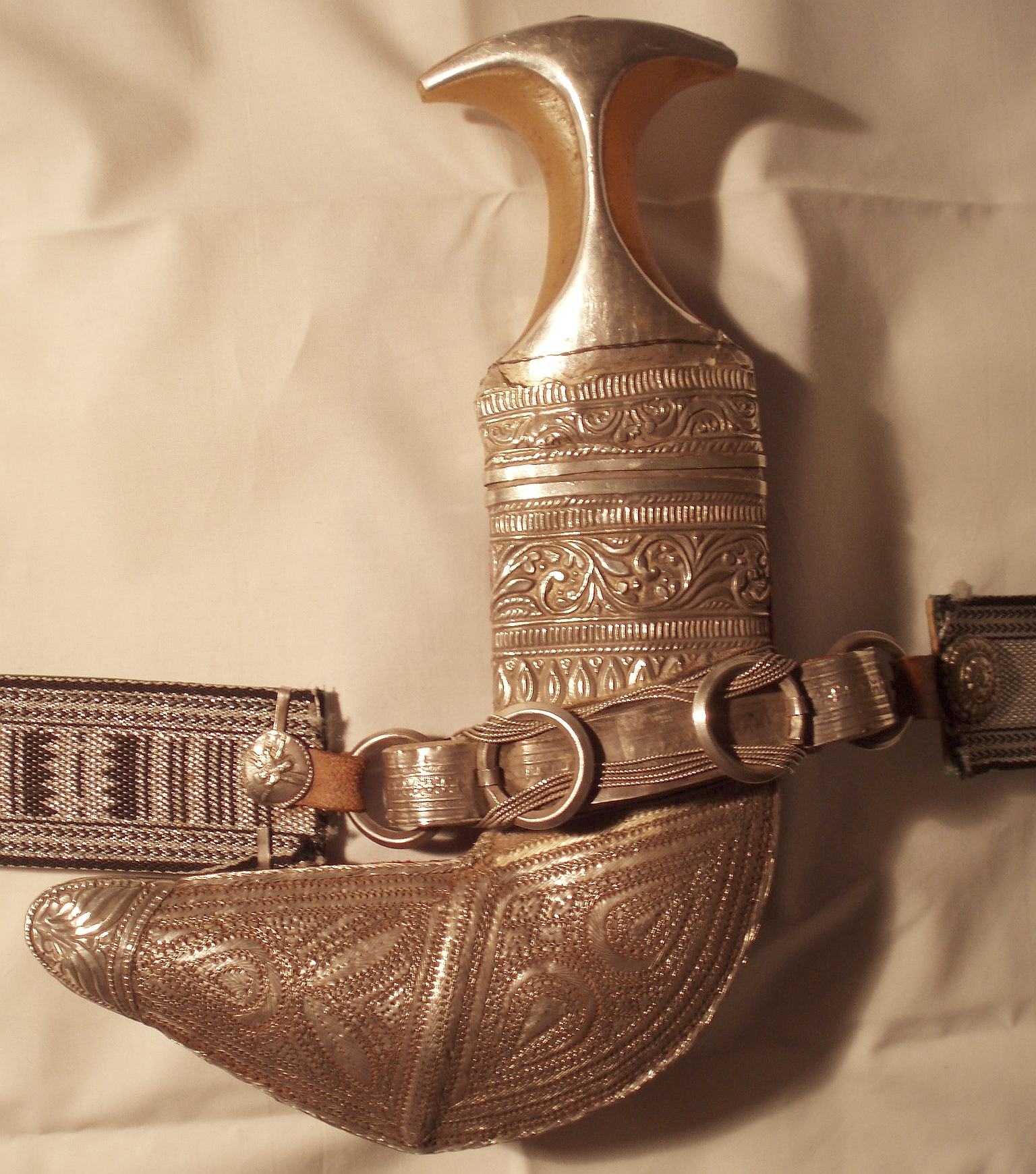
An Omani khanjar, c. 1924

A khanjar (Note: Arabic: خَنْجَر, Kurdish: xencer, Pashto: خنجر, Bengali: খঞ্জর, romanized: khôñjôr, Dhivehi: ޚަންޖަރު, romanized: khanjaru, Turkish: hançer, Persian: خنجر, Urdu: خنجر, Albanian: hanxhari, Montenegrin: ханџар, romanized: handžar, Bosnian: ханџар, romanized: handžar, Croatian: handžar, Hungarian: handzsár, Kazakh: қанжар, romanized: qanjar) is a traditional dagger originating from the Sultanate of Oman. Worn by men for ceremonial occasions, it is a short curved blade shaped like the letter "J" and resembles a hook.

It can be made from a variety of different materials, depending on the quality of its craftsmanship. It is a popular souvenir among tourists and is sold in souqs throughout the region. A national symbol of the sultanate, the khanjar is featured on Oman's national emblem and on the Omani rial. It also features in logos and commercial imagery by companies based in Oman.

== History ==
Although it is not known when the Omani khanjar was first created, rock carvings epitomizing the dagger were found on gravestones located in the central part of the region of the Ru’us al Jibal. These are believed to have predated the Wahhabi revivalist movement, which occurred in the late 1700s. They were also mentioned in an account by Robert Padbrugge of the Dutch Republic, who journeyed to Muscat in June 1672.

== Usage and symbolism ==
=== Composition and manufacturing ===
The national emblem of Oman featuring the khanjar at the centre

Depending on the quality of its craftsmanship, the Omani khanjar can be made using a variety of different metals and other materials. Gold or silver would be used to make khanjar of the finest quality (e.g. for royalty), while brass and copper would be used for daggers made by local craftsmen. For instance, a sheath adorned with gold was historically limited to the Omani upper class. White or Ivory handled and sheathed ones are preferred by the Sayyids or Hashemites symbolising their status in society. Najeeb Altarfayn Saadah in Oman and Arabia usually carry two of them. Traditionally, the dagger is designed by its future owner himself, with the craftsman taking into account the "specifications" and "preferences" stipulated by the former. The time it takes to manufacture a khanjar can range from three weeks to several months.

The most elemental sections of the khanjar are its handle and blade, with the material used in the former playing a significant role influencing the final price of the dagger. Rhinoceros horn and ivory were once the common standard, as it was "considered the best material" to make the hilt out of. However, with the international ban on the ivory trade and rhinoceros horn, the usage of other materials such as wood, plastic, and camel bone has become more prevalent. Typically, the top of the hilt is flat, but the one designed for the royal family is in the shape of a cross.

=== Custom ===
The Omani khanjar is tucked underneath a waist belt and is situated at the front and centre of the wearer's body. It used to form part of everyday attire; however, it is now carried as a "ceremonial dagger", and worn only for formal events and ceremonies – such as weddings, parades, meetings, and diplomatic functions – among many other occasions. Labelled a "ubiquitous sign of masculinity" by John M. Willis in The Arab Studies Journal, the khanjar is a symbol of "manhood, power and authority", as well as serving as a status symbol for the person wearing it. As a result, it is sometimes given by families to their sons when they reach adolescence, and is a common wedding gift to the groom.

Although the khanjar was originally created as a weapon to attack and defend, it is used solely for ceremonial and practical purposes today. The latter situation would occur in the desert, where it is used as a tool for hunting and skinning animals, as well as for slicing ropes. Because of this development, it is now considered a "social taboo" in Oman to pull out one's khanjar from its scabbard without blooding it, since the only time men would do this would be to seek vengeance or to defend oneself.

=== Distribution ===
While the khanjar is most prevalent in Yemen where the majority of the Northern men wear it every day. In Oman it is given its symbolic status there, it is also worn by men in the United Arab Emirates, forming an integral component of "traditional dress" in those countries. It can also be found and is sold in other states in Eastern Arabia, such as the Souq Waqif in Doha, Qatar. The khanjar is a popular keepsake among tourists, and is the Sultanate's best-selling memento.

=== Other uses ===
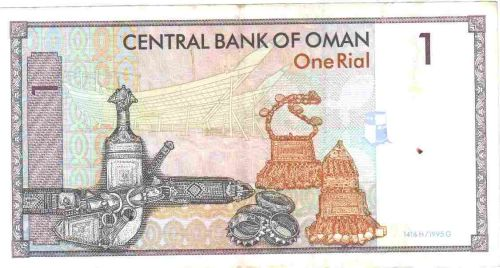
The khanjar is depicted on the reverse of the Omani one rial note.

==== Official government ====
As the khanjar is a national symbol of Oman, it is featured on the sultanate's national emblem. It has been a symbol on the royal crest of the Al Said dynasty since the 18th century, which subsequently became the national emblem. It is also depicted on the Omani rial – the country's currency – specifically on the one rial note, as well as on postage stamps issued by the sultanate. Furthermore, there are statues of khanjar on buildings housing government ministries and at various roundabouts throughout the country.

=== Commercial ===
The khanjar was previously shown prominently on the logo and planes of Oman Air – the country's flag carrier – until it was removed under a rebranding in 2008. The logo of Omantel also illustrates a stylized khanjar; it was retained in the logotype's motif after the telecommunications company merged with Oman Mobile in 2010. Moreover, the perfume company Amouage, which is owned by the Sultan of Oman and his royal family, incorporates the dagger into the design of its bottles. The cap on its Gold for Men perfume bottle resembles the handle of a khanjar, complementing the Gold for Women cap which evokes the dome of Ruwi Mosque.

== See also ==
- Shotel, the traditional Ethiopian sickle sword
- Firangi
- Janbiya
- Jile
- Keris
- Khanda
- Khanjali, a dagger from the Caucasus
- Kilij
- Pulwar
- Sabre
- Saif
- Sgian-dubh
- Shamshir
- Zulfiqar
