= Shotel =

Type of curved sword originating in Ethiopia

Shotel ሾተል
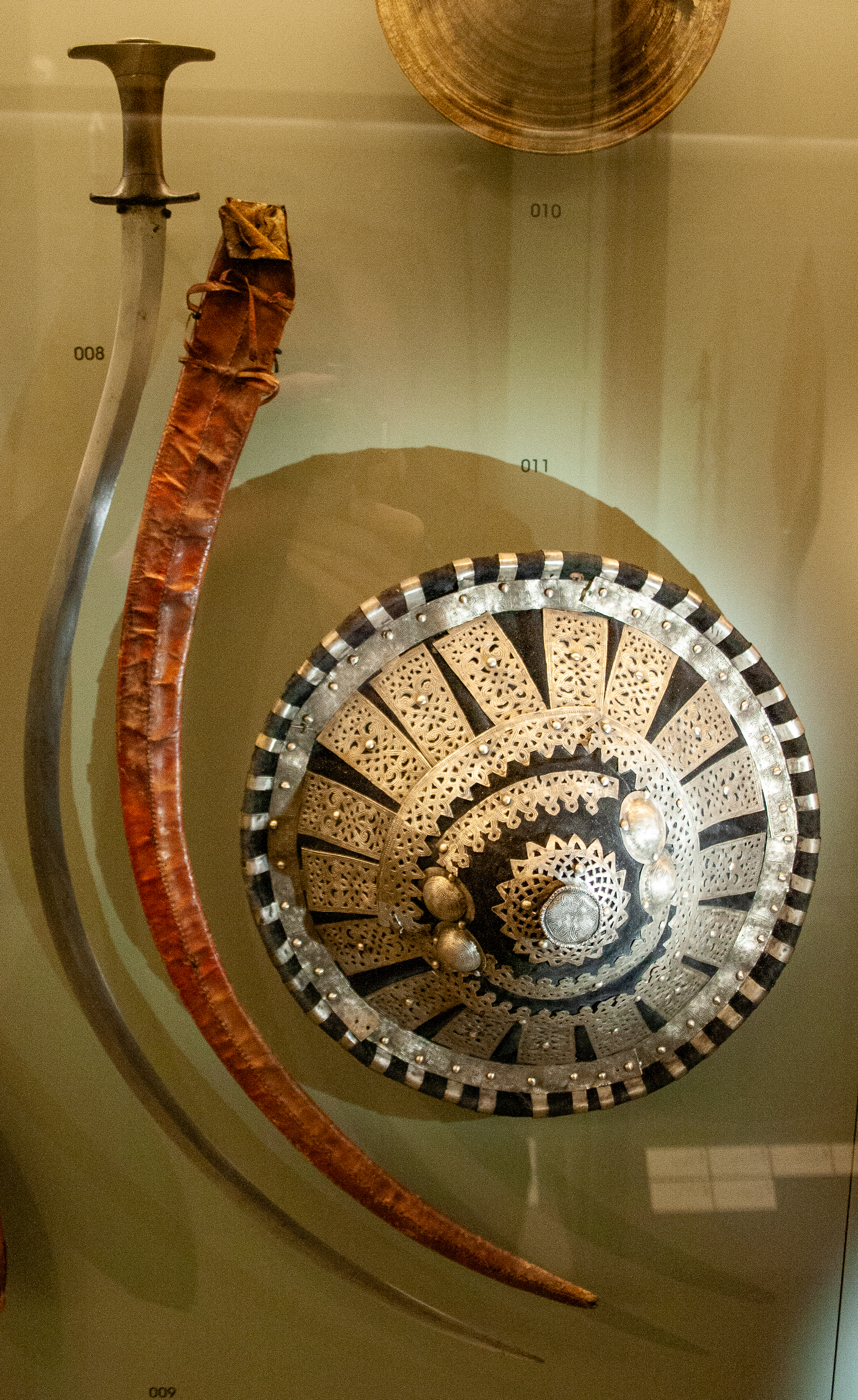
- A shotel (left), a shotel's scabbard (middle) and a Gasha shield.
- Type: Sword
- Place of origin: Northern Ethiopian Highlands (Amhara, Tigray, Eritrean Highlands)

Service history
- In service: Ethiopian Empire
- Used by: Army of the Ethiopian Empire (Chewa regiments)

Specifications
- Mass: avg. 0.9–1.8 kg (2.0–4.0 lb)
- Length: avg. 76–102 cm (30–40 in)
- Blade length: avg. 40–64 cm (16–25 in)
- Blade type: Flat and curved
- Hilt type: No guard, usually rhinoceros horn
- Scabbard/sheath: Leather, often heavily decorated

A shotel (Amharic: ሾተል) is a curved sword originating from Tigray Northern Ethiopia and Southern-central Eritrea. The curve on the blade varies from the Persian shamshir, adopting an almost semicircular shape. The blade is often double-edged with a diamond cross-section and about 40 inches (1 m) in total length. Nearly universal is a three-piece rhinoceros horn hilt with no guard, identical to that of the jile or jambiya, though wood and later bakelite examples have been observed. The shotel was typically carried in a close fitting leather scabbard which was sometimes decorated with precious metals.

== History ==
After the restoration of Emperor Yekuno Amlak, the resurgent emperors began to organize their armies in a manner similar to the Aksumites, culminating in the reign of Emperor Amda Seyon I. Shotel wielders, known as shotelai or hanetay and organized in the Axurarat Shotelai, made up one of the elite forces of Amda Seyon's Imperial host. Along with the Hareb Gonda and Korem cavalry, Keste Nihb archers, and Axuarat Axuarai lancers, they were said to be the forces that "flew through the air like the eagle and spun on the ground like the avalanche." Notable shotel techniques included slashing attacks that had devastating effects especially against mounted opponents. The shotel could be used to loop and rip a warrior off their horse. Classically, the shotel was employed in a dismounted state to hook the opponent by reaching around a shield or any other defensive implement or weapon. The shotel and other Eritrean and northern Ethiopian swords are occasionally referred to collectively in Geez as han'e.

Due to increased trade with the west, over time the shotel began to be replaced in the southern Kingdom of Shewa and Shewan dominated Ethiopian Empire by swords fitted with European sabre blades known as Gurade or Gorade. In Amhara culture the generic word for sword, Seif (Amharic: ሰይፍ), is also applicable but mainly used to refer to a straight bladed, double edged sword. Traditional Shotel fencing incorporated much jumping and lunging. Typically, warriors in Northeast Africa wore circular shields strapped to their forearms with weapons carried on the same side as their dominant hand in order to be drawn while horseback. This left the shield hand free to steer Ethiopian horses. The Ethiopian riding style thus involved a unique approach characterized by single rein control, often without a bit, and mounting from the right side (unlike most others). Ethiopian curved swords were thus awkward to draw and ceremonial in nature. Like most other swords they were mainly used in place of spears or projectiles and historically served as a status symbol, being highly attractive to women.

“A great long Shotel with its silver ball,

Goes down with the women, and that’s all –

A first-rate sword with its silver knob,

Goes down with the women, that’s its job”

According to William Cornwallis Harris, the sword protruded from behind the wearer like a tail and was difficult to draw: "girded to the loins of every male subject in the kingdom (of Shewa) be his profession what it may." "Highly crescent shaped, it rather resembles a sickle than an implement of war - It serves equally at the banquet and in the field." He continues, "the serf still appears in the raw fleece of the sheep. During the journey or the foray a cloak, composed of the prepared skin of the lion, the leopard, or the ocelot, is thrown over the shoulders of the better classes." Negus Sahle Selassie would pass on to his descendants (among them Menelik II and Haile Selassie) a sword made of gold.

== Design ==
100

Its shape, similar to a large sickle, was effectively used to reach around an opponent's shield and stab them in vital areas such as the kidneys or lungs. While closely resembling the Afar gile, the gile universally has two cutting edges, while the shotel's upper edge is often unsharpened and sometimes braced against the swordsman's shield for strength. The sword does commonly come sharp on both sides. Common beneath the hilt was a circular, silver or golden-colored pommel carved with a design said to be known as a "timbora" or a coin. Though rarer, surviving handles can be found decorated with rivets of steel and leather wraps. The scabbard more often than not had a slit atop the opening, making it easier to draw, which was traditionally done with the hand of the same side it was worn. Sheaths of various colors are in existence and regularly richly ornamented with engravings of braids, spirals, and other patterns. In circulation are those with mounts of brass, silver, and sometimes precious minerals not unlike the traditional Gasha (Amharic: ጋሻ) shields they were worn alongside, both of which were recorded as made with Morocco leather. The end of their sheaths were originally extremely curved, likely to stop them from slipping off of the wearers hip (closely resembling the Yemeni jambia) and were slipped through a thin leather belt. This was usually topped with a cross or, in older examples, a spherical decoration at the tip. Also commonly depicted in Gondarine period artwork were Kaskara-like swords with spatulate tips likely serving a similar purpose. While some had fullers and raised midribs, many swords flat sides were decorated with Amharic inscriptions extolling their quality, the virtue of their owner, or of a religious nature

The mid-18th century European visitor to Eritrea and northern Ethiopia, Remedius Prutky, often used the word shotel to describe a carving knife. In appearance it is similar to Armenian-style Yatagan sabres, which feature a prominent curve, and sickle makraka swords of the Zande people native to Central Africa (although they are unrelated, and the makraka are similar to various throwing knives and axes from that region such as the mambele, onzil, sengese, and trumbash), and less so to Middle Eastern scimitars.

== In popular culture ==
- Age of Empires II features Shotel Warriors in African campaigns.
- The Marvel Cinematic Universe films of Black Panther (film), Avengers: Infinity War and Avengers: Endgame features shotels being used by the Border Tribe.
- The XXXG-0SR Gundam Sandrock from the Mobile Suit Gundam Wing series is equipped with a pair of heat-radiating shotel
- Monster Hunter (18 variants of the long sword weapon)
- In Dark Souls, the player can purchase a shotel from Shiva of the East or acquire one from a particular corpse in Sen's Fortress. Also, the character Lautrec the Embraced uses two shotels in combat. True to the weapon's real-world history, it can damage an enemy even when they block with a shield. The shotel reappears in Dark Souls II and again in Dark Souls III, which also introduces the Carthus Shotel.
- Elden Ring features the Shotel, the Eclipse Shotel, and the Vulgar Militia Shotel which is fastened to a long shaft to function like a halberd.
- Assassin's Creed Origins' Rusted Blade and Shotel weapons
- Granblue Fantasy's imperial and silver shotel weapons

== Gallery ==
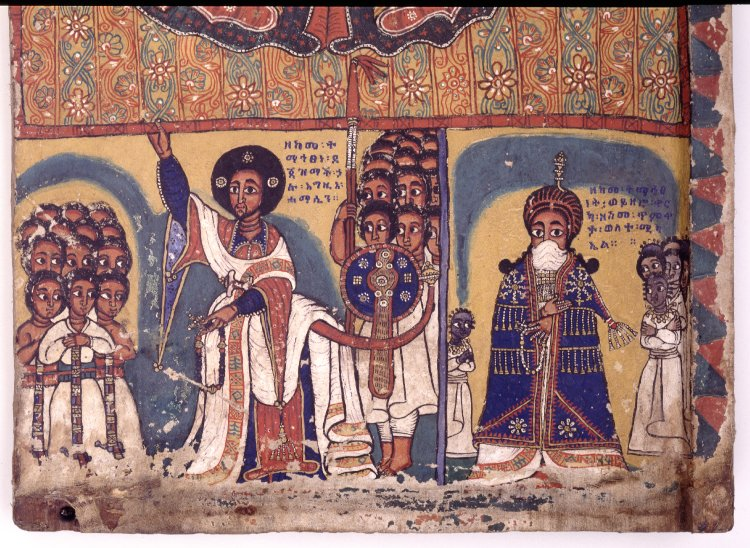
Dejazmach Hailu carrying a shotel.

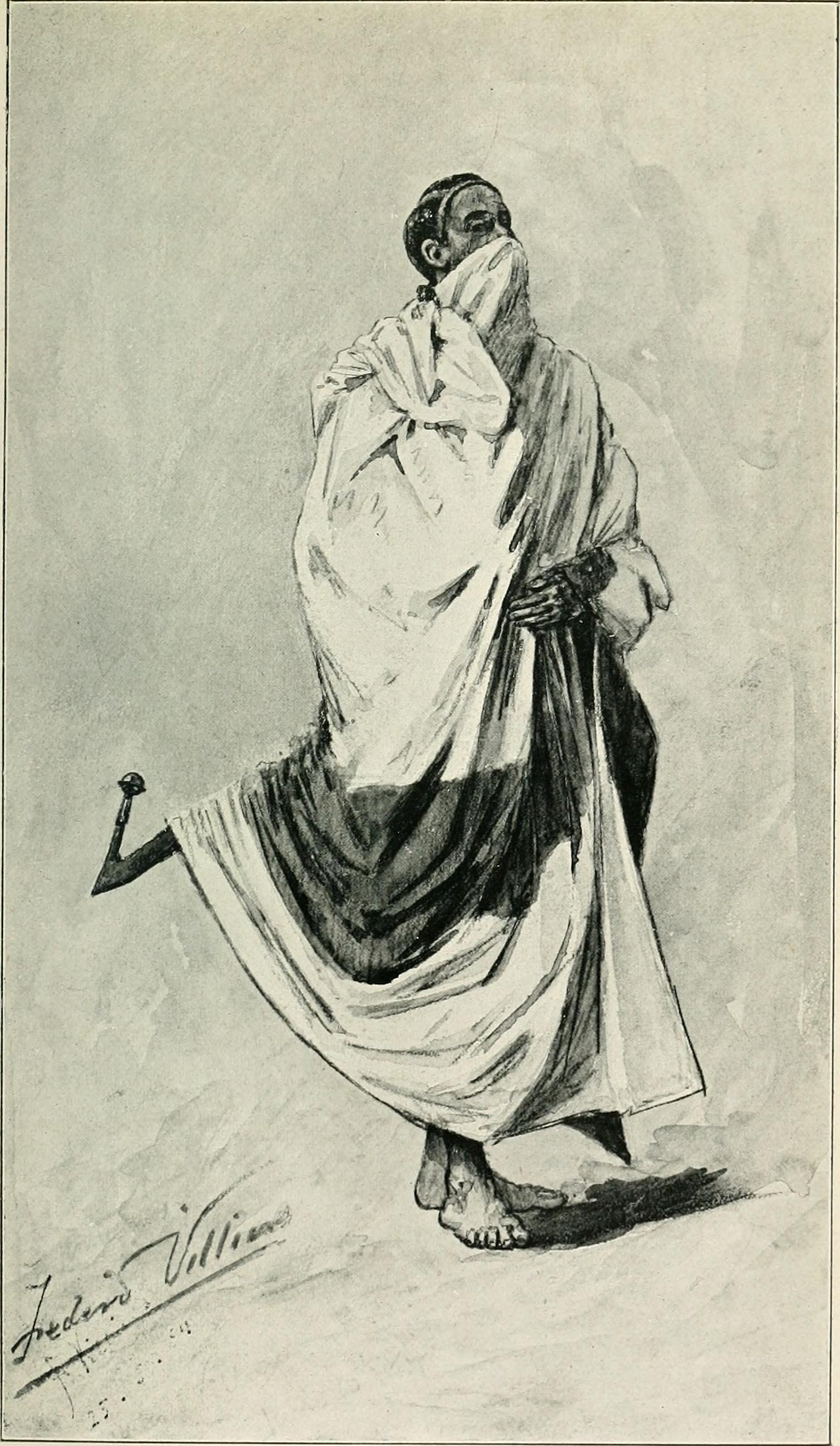
1907 engraving of an Ethiopian soldier

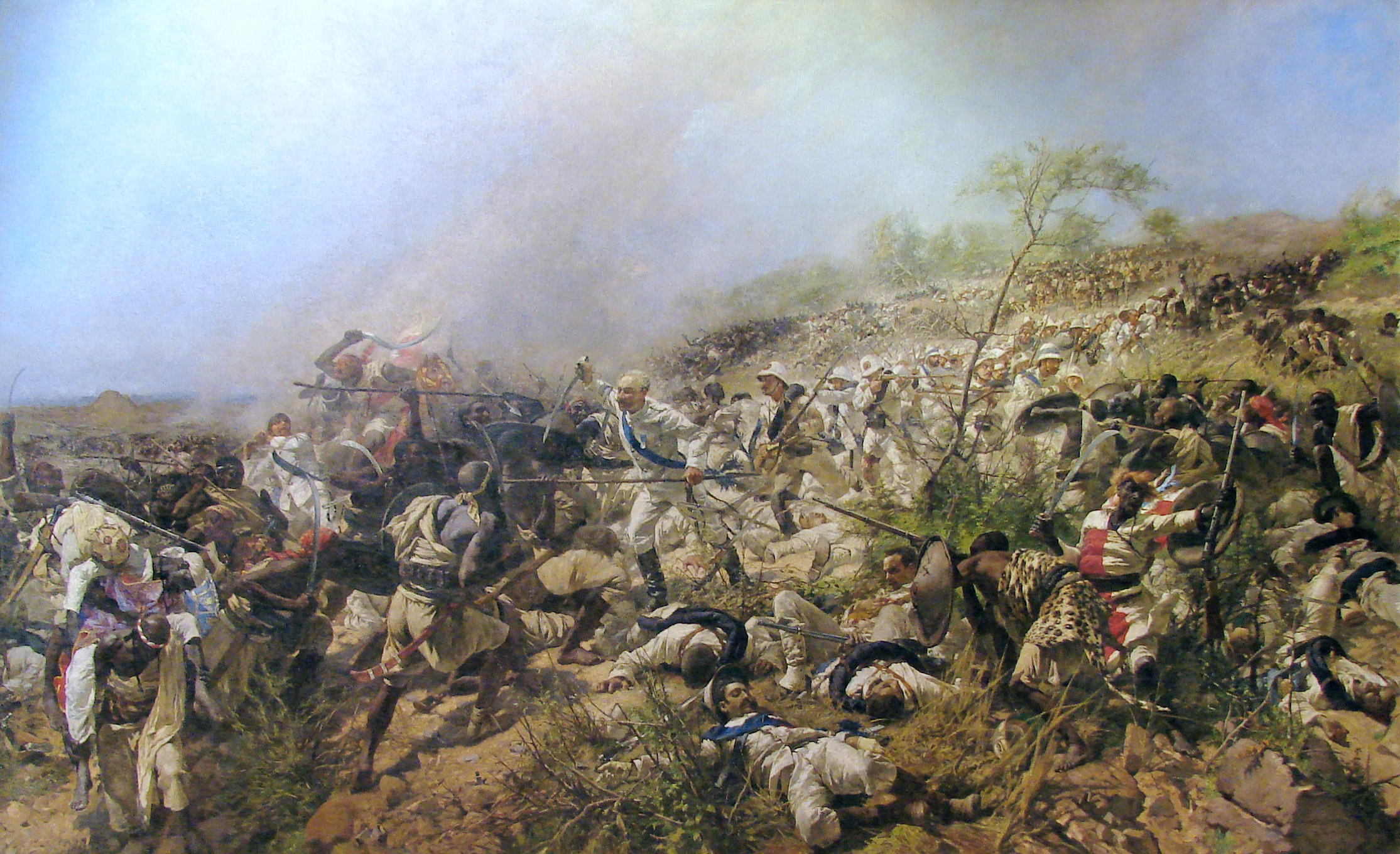
1896 painting of the Italo-Ethiopian War of 1887–1889

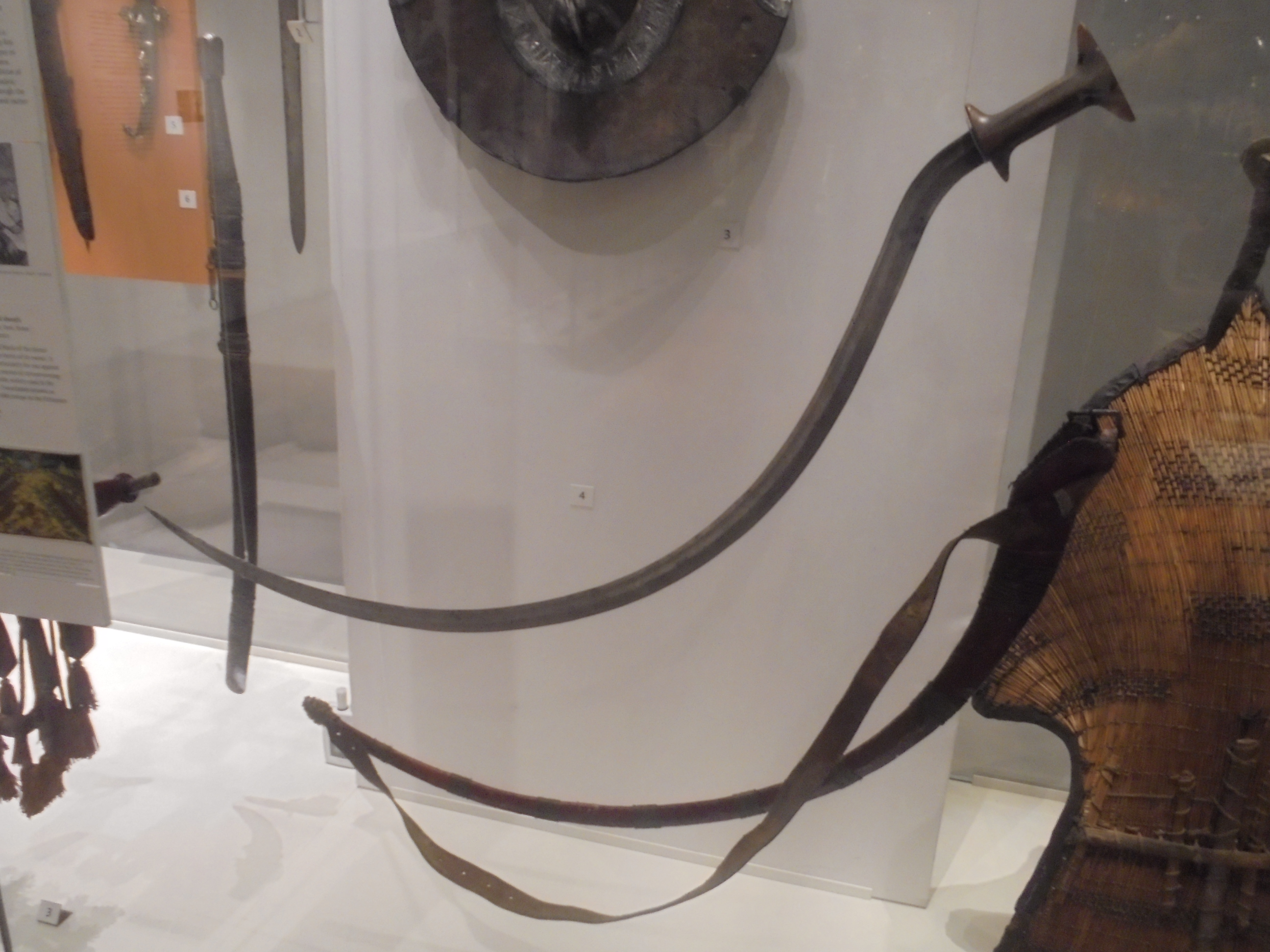
A shotel in the collection of the British Museum

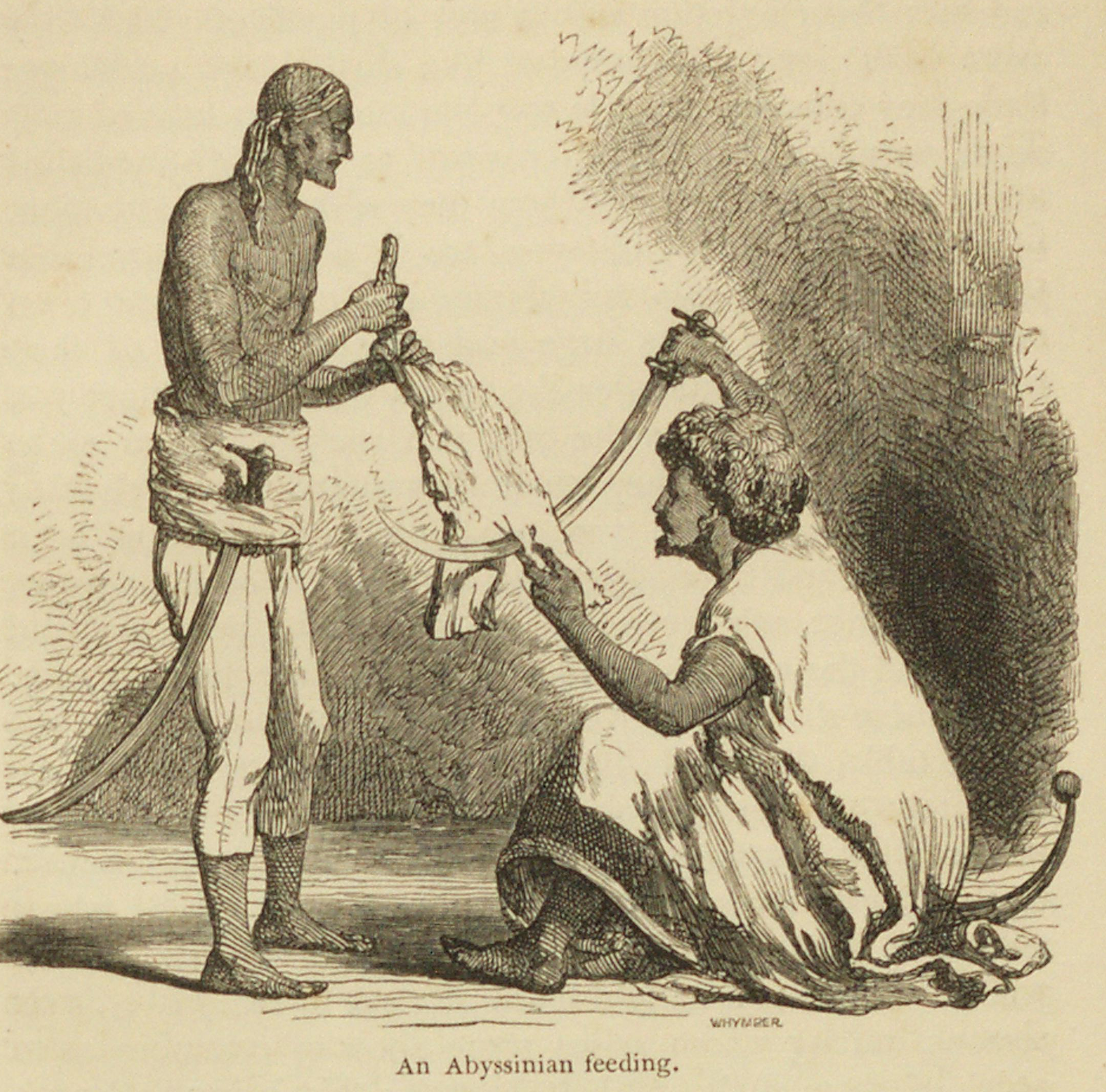
An Ethiopian cutting meat with a shotel.

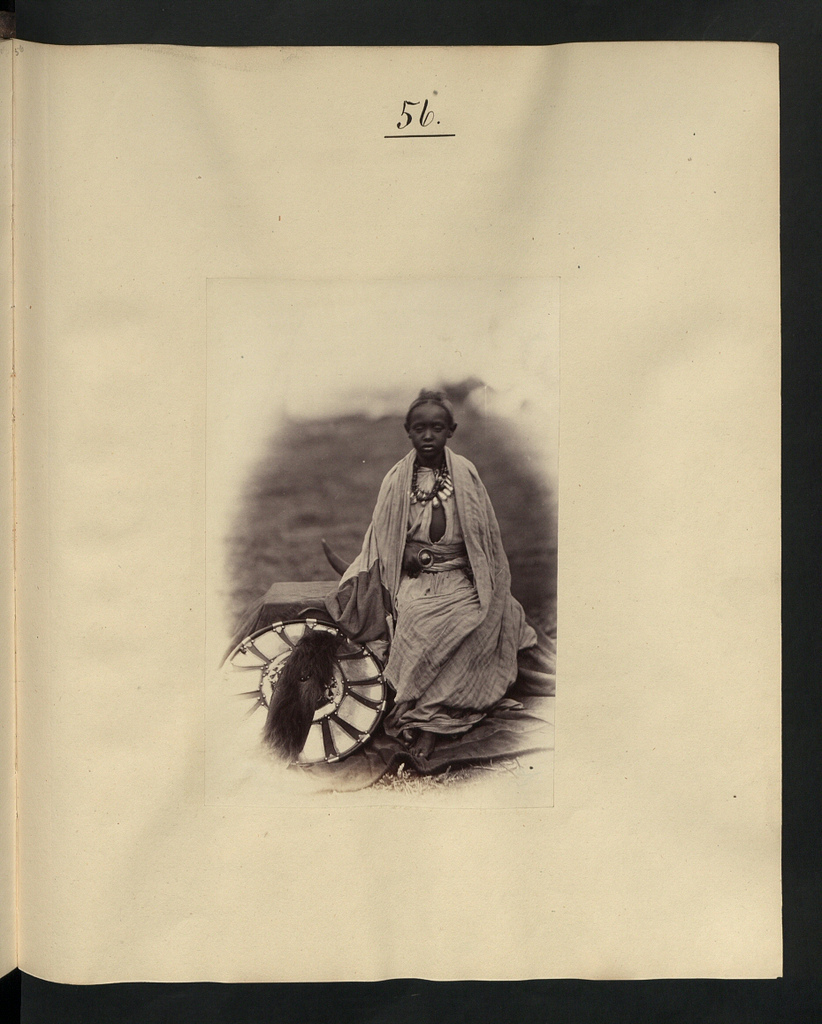
An Ethiopian child with a shield and a shotel.

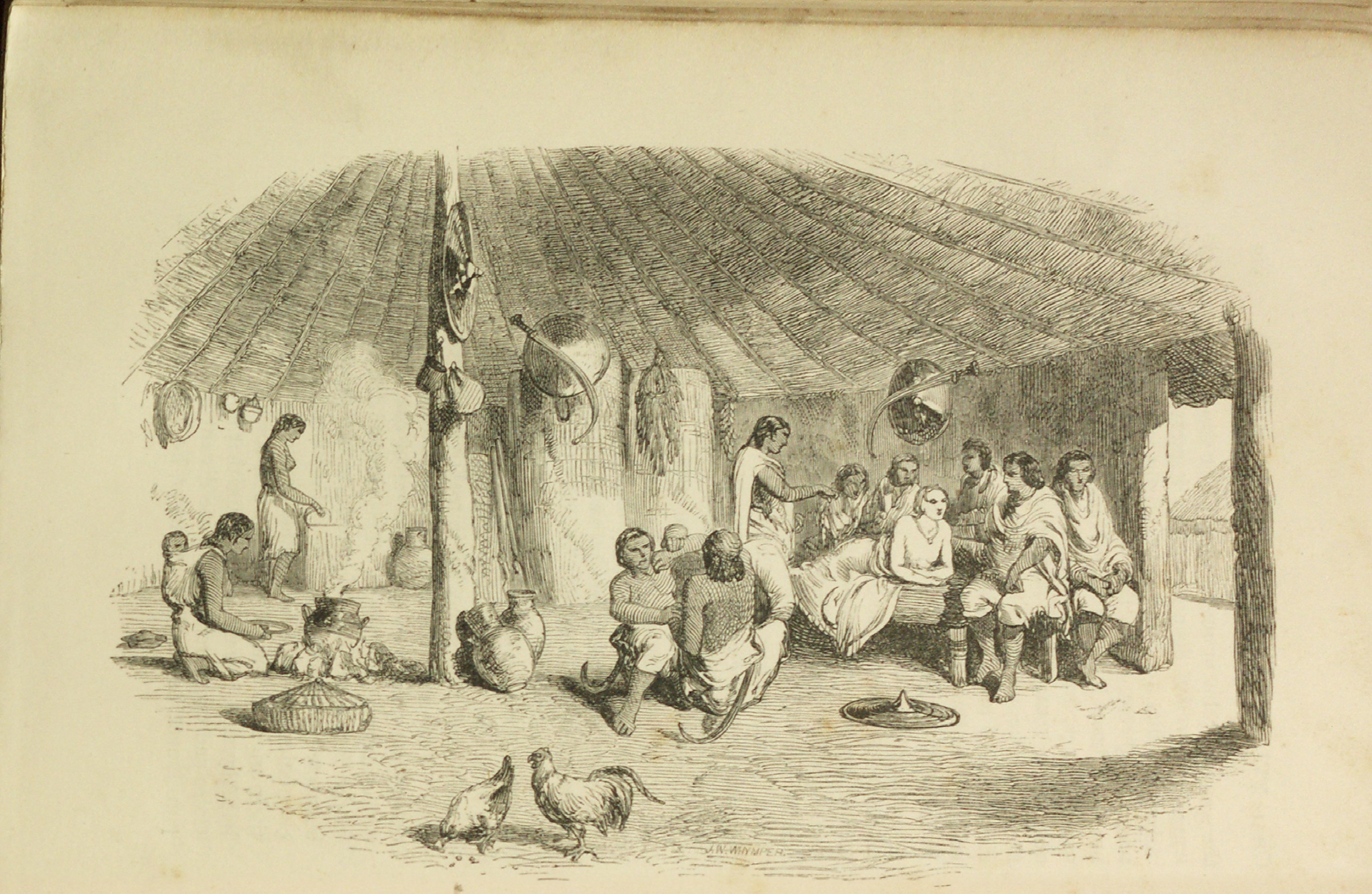
A shotel and shield hanging on the roof of an Ethiopian house.

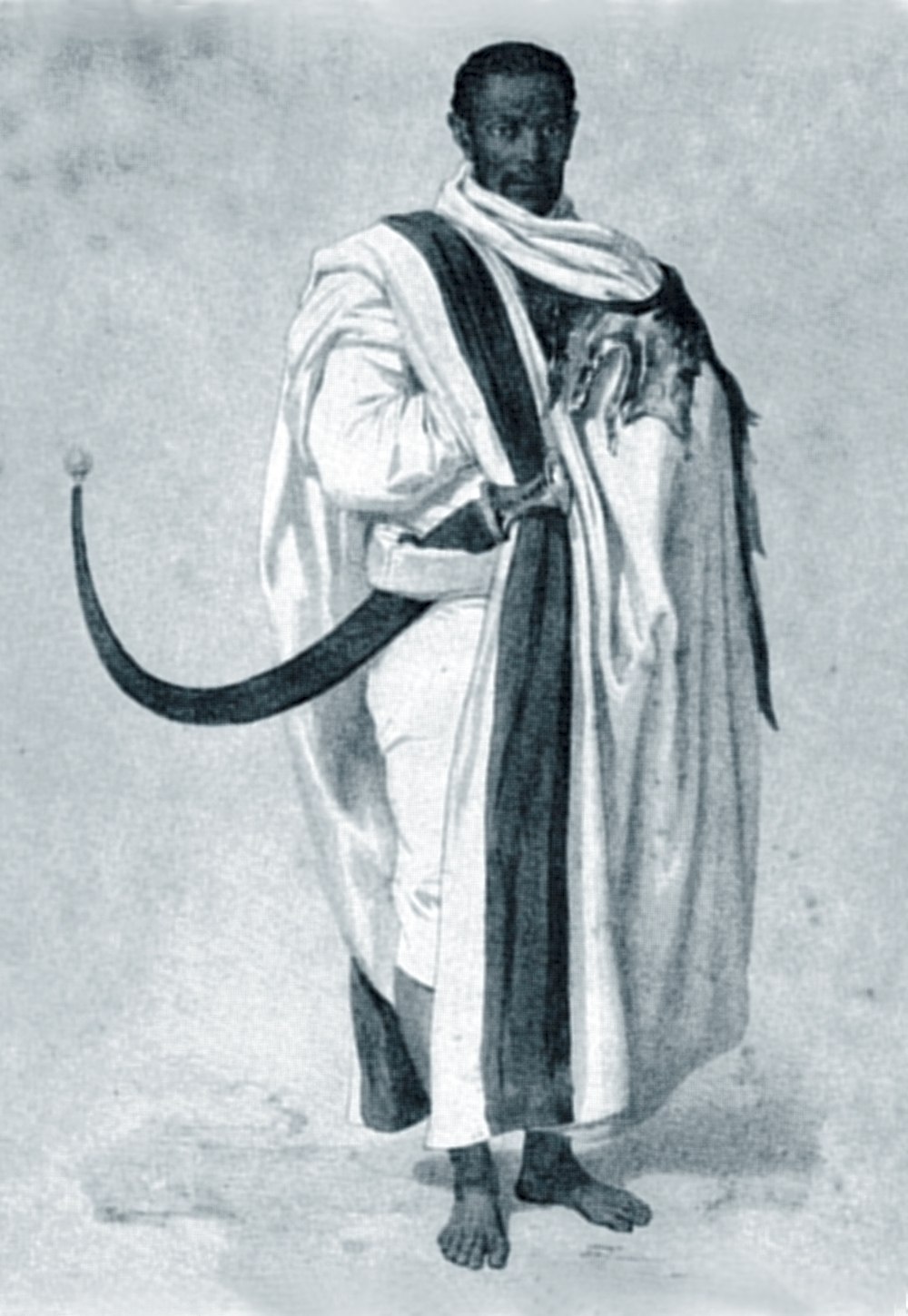
Depiction of a nobleman and officer under the service of Dejazmach Wube Haile Maryam

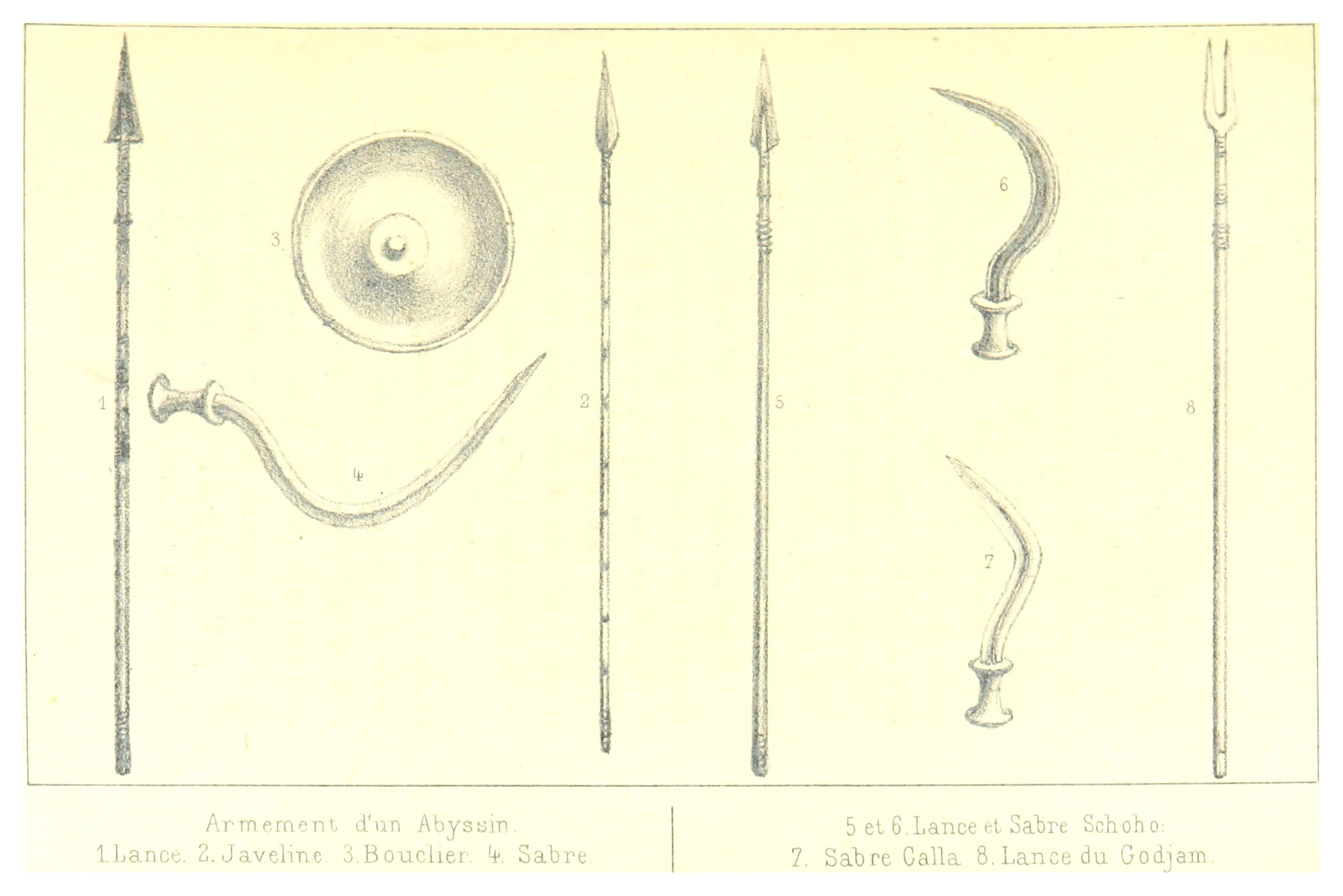
Voyage en Abyssinie et chez les Gallas-Raias. L'Ethiopie

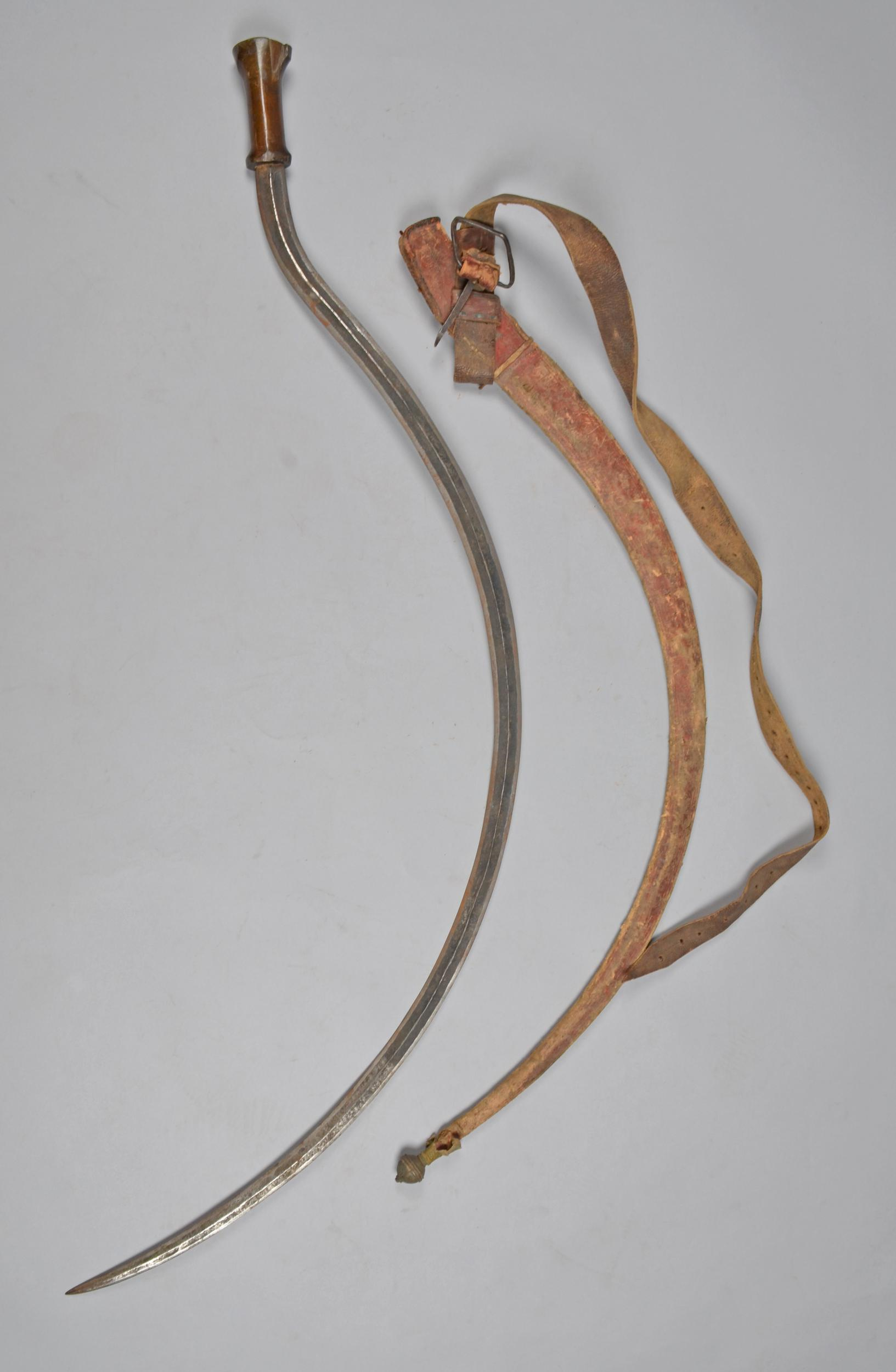
Sword (shotel) forged from iron with carved wooden hilt. Sickle shaped, double edged, with central riser; bevelled on either side.

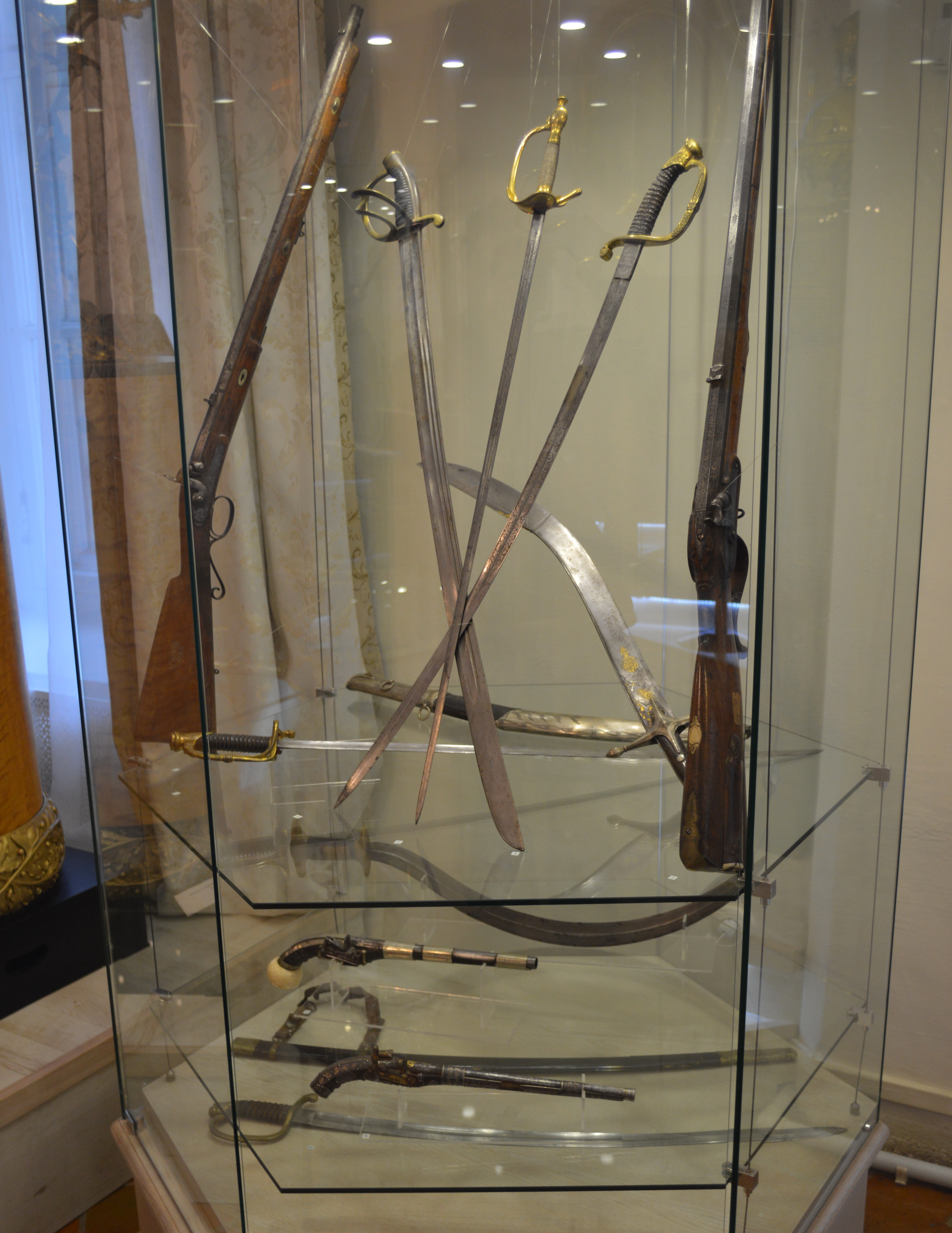
19th c. shotel among other weapons at the Russian Goritsky Monastery (Pereslavl-Zalessky) historical museum.

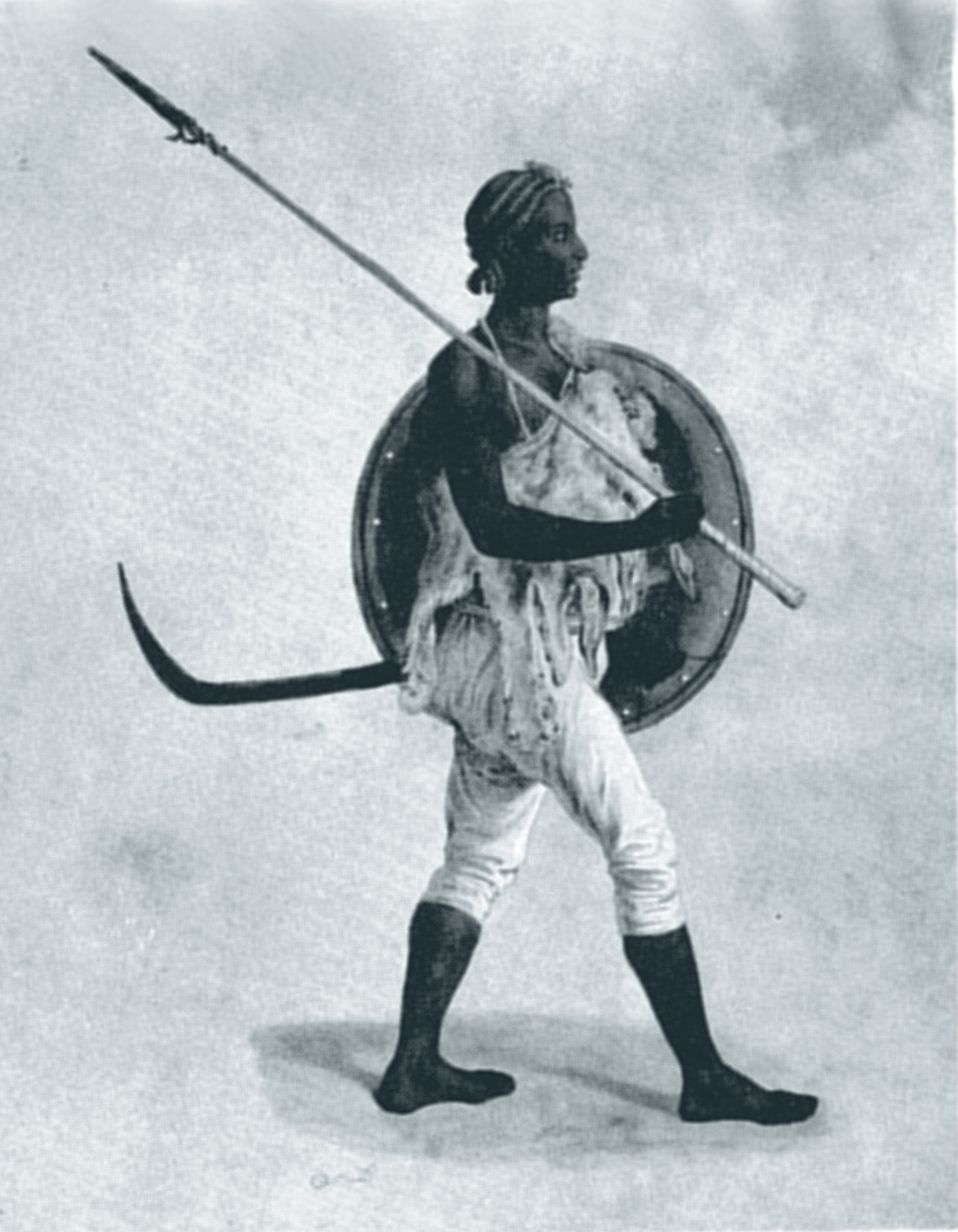
A lancer of Tigre, 1849

== See also ==
- Sickle sword, a similar weapon used by the Bronze Age Canaanites, Israelites, Assyrians and Ancient Egyptians
- Falx, a curved weapon used by the ancient Thracians
- Urumi, a flexible sword used in Kalaripayattu, an Indian martial art originated in Kerala, a state in South India
- Jile of the Afar people
- Jambiya
- Khanjar
