= Jambiya =

Type of dagger

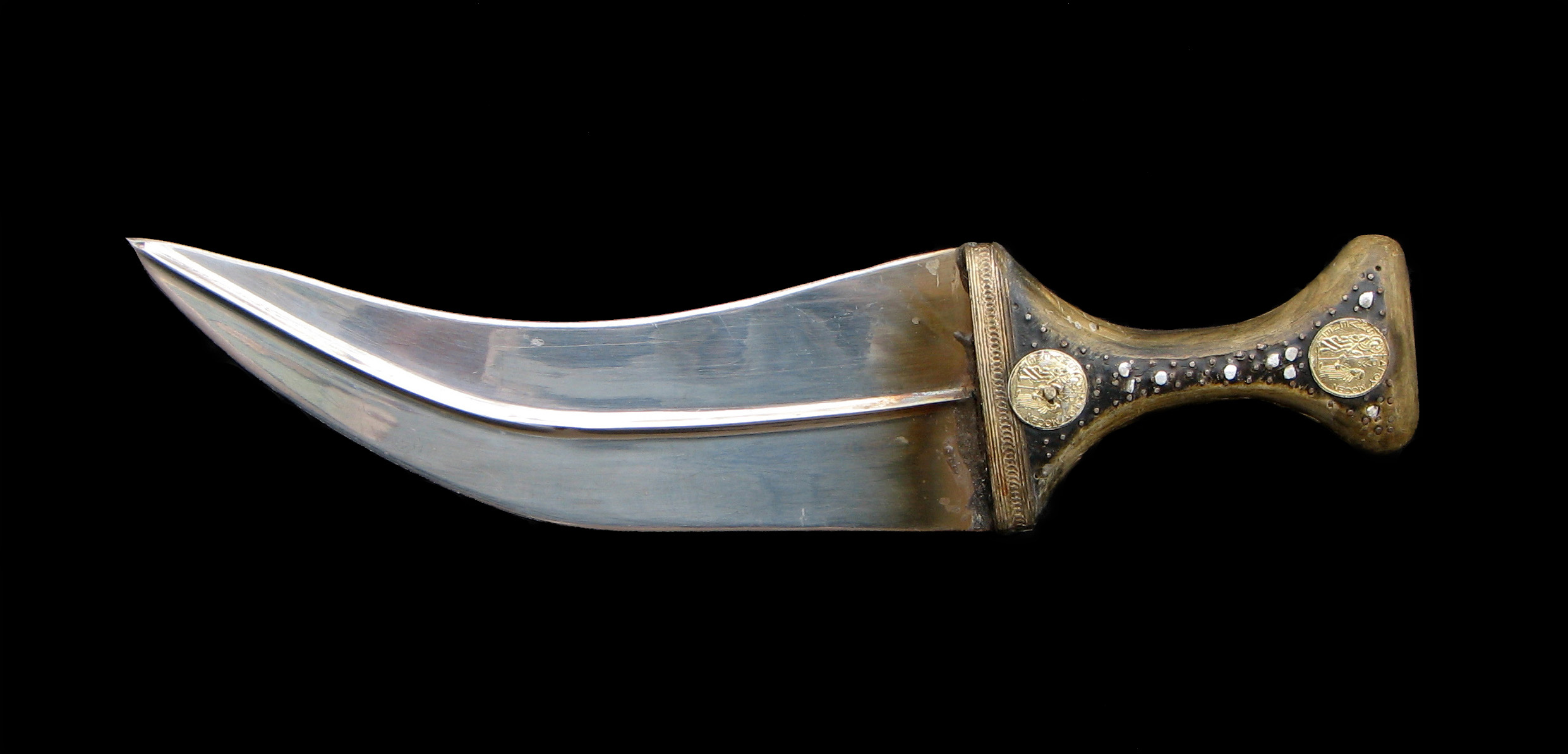
A jambiya

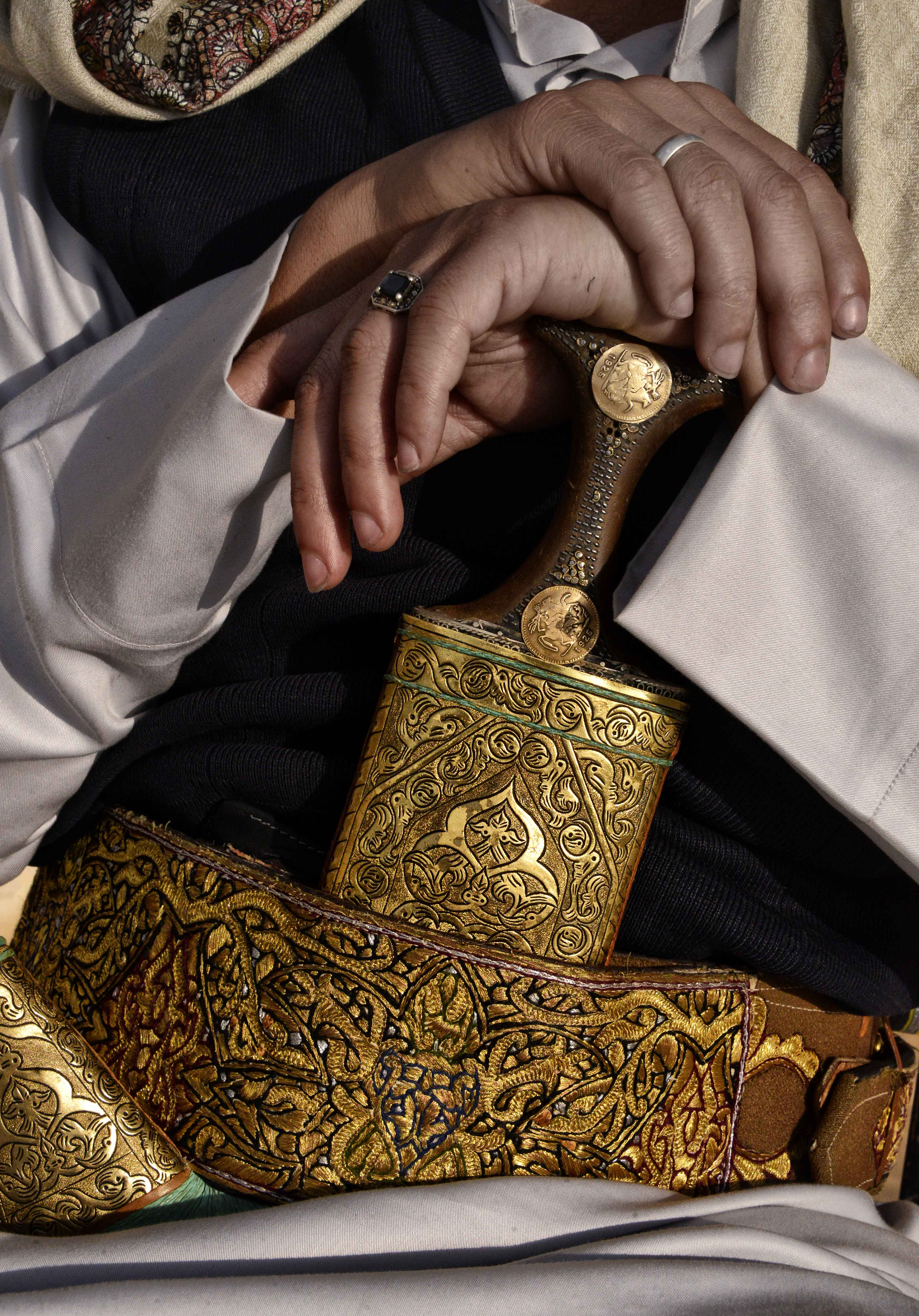
A man wearing a Yemeni jambiya

A jambiya (Arabic: جنبية), (Note: also spelled janbiya, jambya, jambia and janbia) is a type of dagger with a short curved blade with a medial ridge that originated from the Hadhramaut region in Yemen. They have spread to other countries in the Middle East, to other countries in the Arab world, and to parts of South Asia and Southeast Asia. Men above the age of 14 wear it as an accessory to their clothing.

== Etymology ==
The word jambiya comes from the Arabic word janb (Arabic: جنب, lit. 'side'). It is worn on the side in a sheath made of wood fixed to the waist. The belt that holds the jambiya is made of tanned leather or thick cloth.

== Structure ==
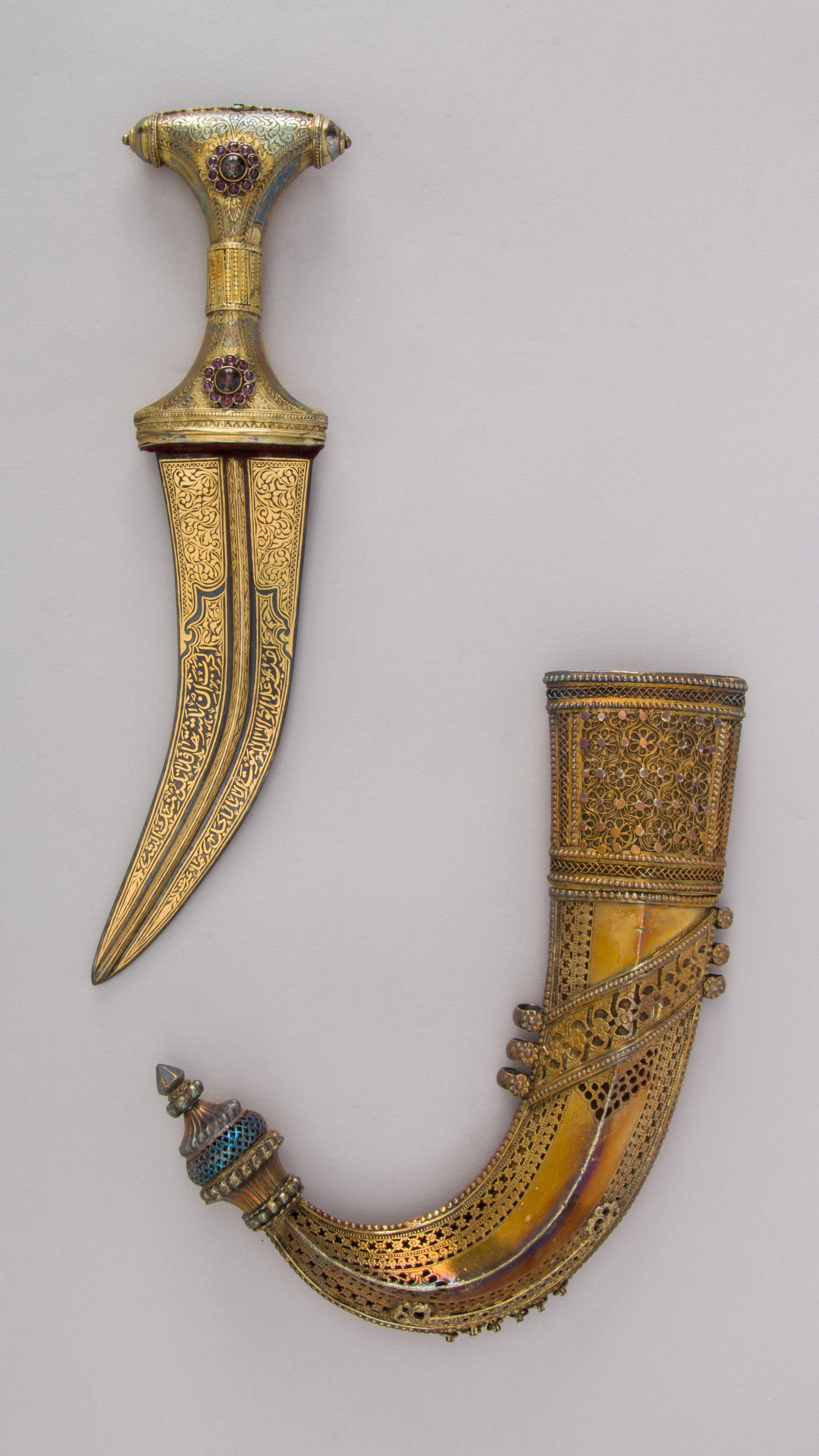
Decorated golden Jambiya

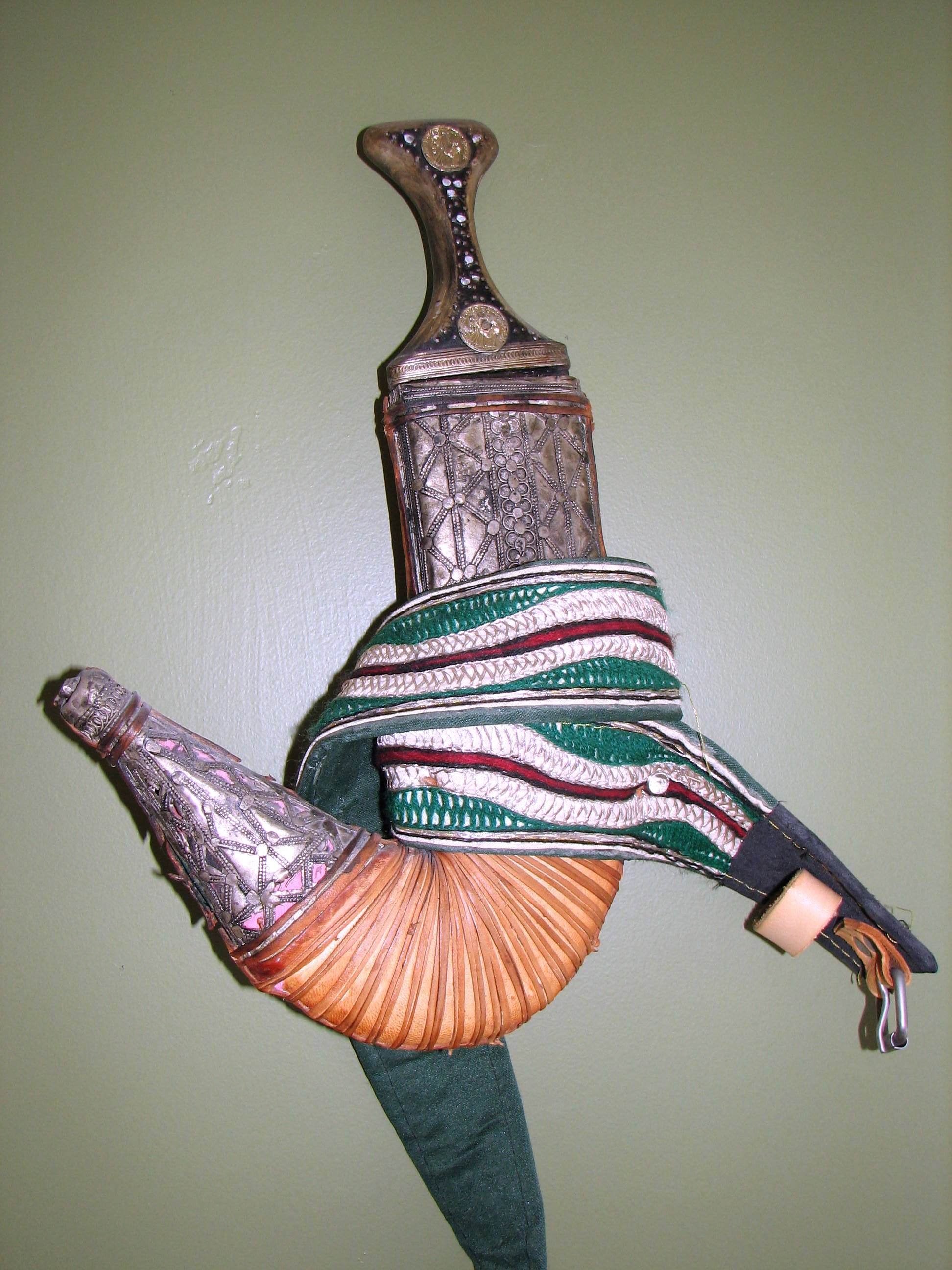
Jambiya from Yemen in its sheath

The jambiya were taken by travelers to other cultures including the Ottoman Empire, Persia and India, where they were adopted with slight differences to the blade, hilt and scabbard.

=== Hilt or handle ===
A significant part of a jambiya is its hilt (handle). The saifani hilt is made of rhinoceros horn, which can cost up to $1500 per kilogram; poaching of black rhinoceros for this purpose has led them to become critically endangered. It is used on the daggers of wealthier citizens. Different versions of saifani hilts can be distinguished by their colour. Other janbiya hilts are made of different types of horn, wood, metal and ivory from elephants and walruses. Apart from the material used for the hilt, the design and detail is a measure of its value and the status of its owner.

=== Blade, sheath and belt ===
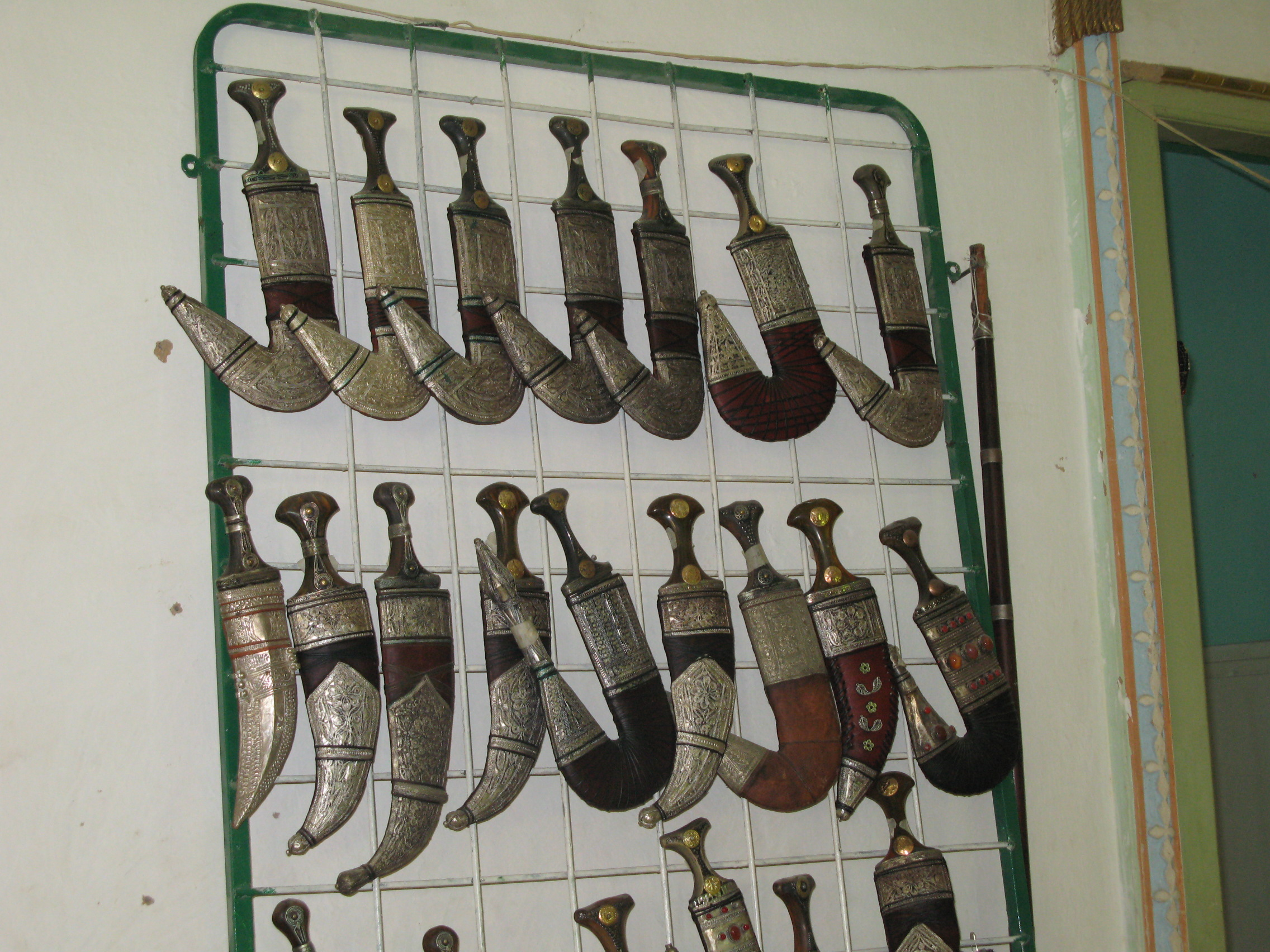
Jambiyas from a museum in Tarim, Hadhramaut

The double edged blade of the jambiya is constructed of steel that in some cases is Damascus or wootz steel. The blade is stored in a sheath known as 'Asib (Arabic: العسيب), usually made of wood covered with metal, leather or cloth. The sheath can be decorated with various ornaments that signify status. These include silver work, semi-precious stones, and leather. The sheath can be fixed to a leather belt, which is normally 2–3 inches (5.1–7.6 cm) wide. The belt is usually worn around the lower abdomen. There are often other items attached to this belt, such as a silver purse for containing money and change. Sometimes, Jambiyas are made from shrapnel left over from missiles in a war.

== Use ==
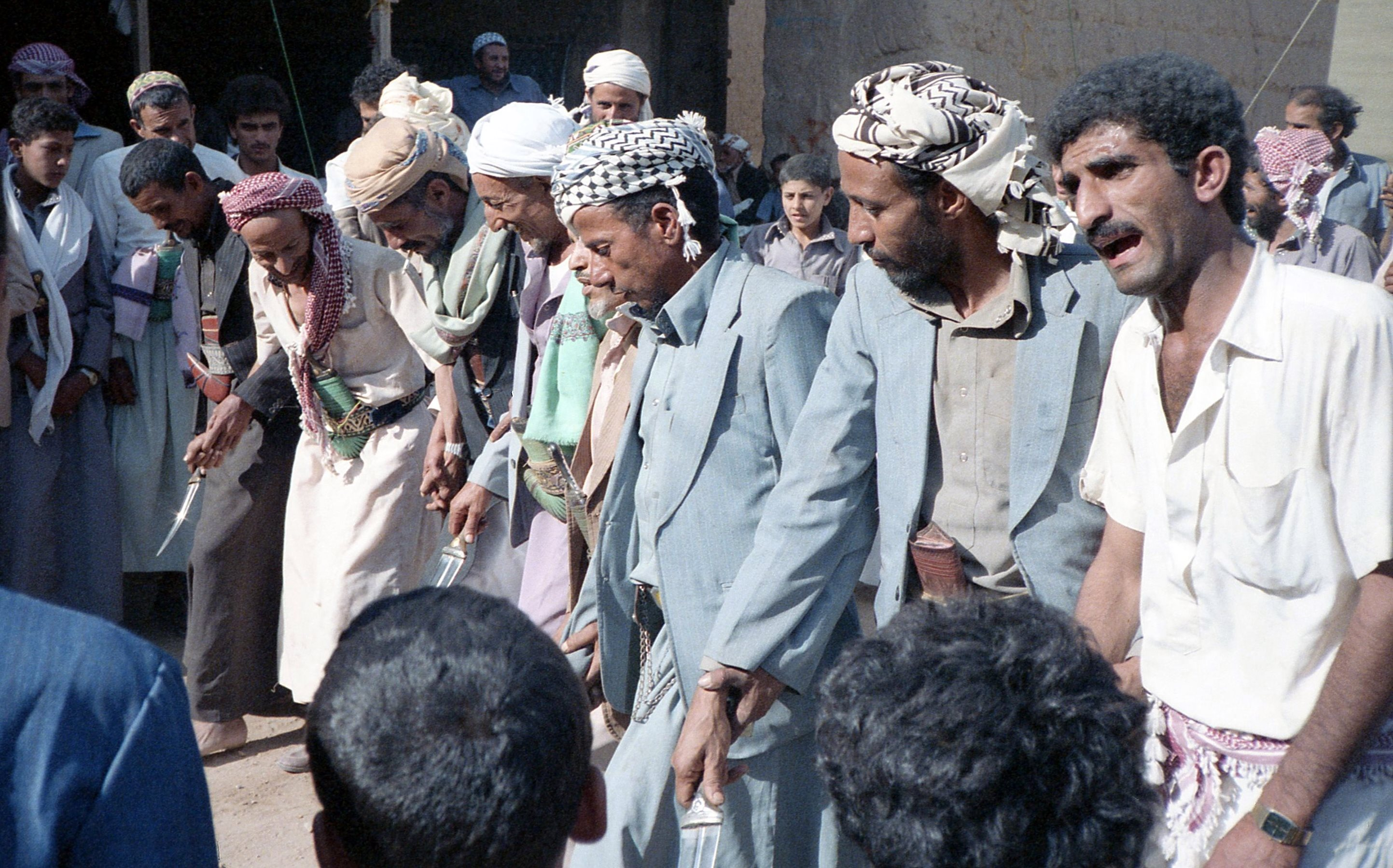
Men in Saadah, Yemen with janbiyas drawn, 1986

Despite the cultural significance of the jambiya, it is still a weapon. Although people have used it in times of dispute, there are societal norms that must be followed in order to avoid defamation. The jambiya should only come out of its sheath in extreme cases of conflict. It is also commonly used in traditional events, such as dances.

Like with some other curved knives, as the blade bends towards the opponent, the user need not angle the wrist, which makes it more comfortable as a stabbing weapon than straight-bladed knives. Its heavy blade enables the user to inflict deep wounds.

== Yemeni jambiya ==
A jambiya is a short dagger worn by men in Yemen. The handle of a jambiya tells the status of the man who wears it.

=== Material ===
The jambiya handle often tells of the social status of the man who wears it. Jambiyas were often made with ivory handles. The manufacturers most often receive this material through smugglers, due to the international ban on the substance. As ivory has only ever had ornamental merit in such an application, those that recognize the jambiya as a tool and/or weapon tend to prefer a hardwood handle anyway. Many street-side charlatans will proclaim to sell ivory-handled jambiyas whilst actually selling poorly-made blades with white plastic handles.

=== Qualities ===
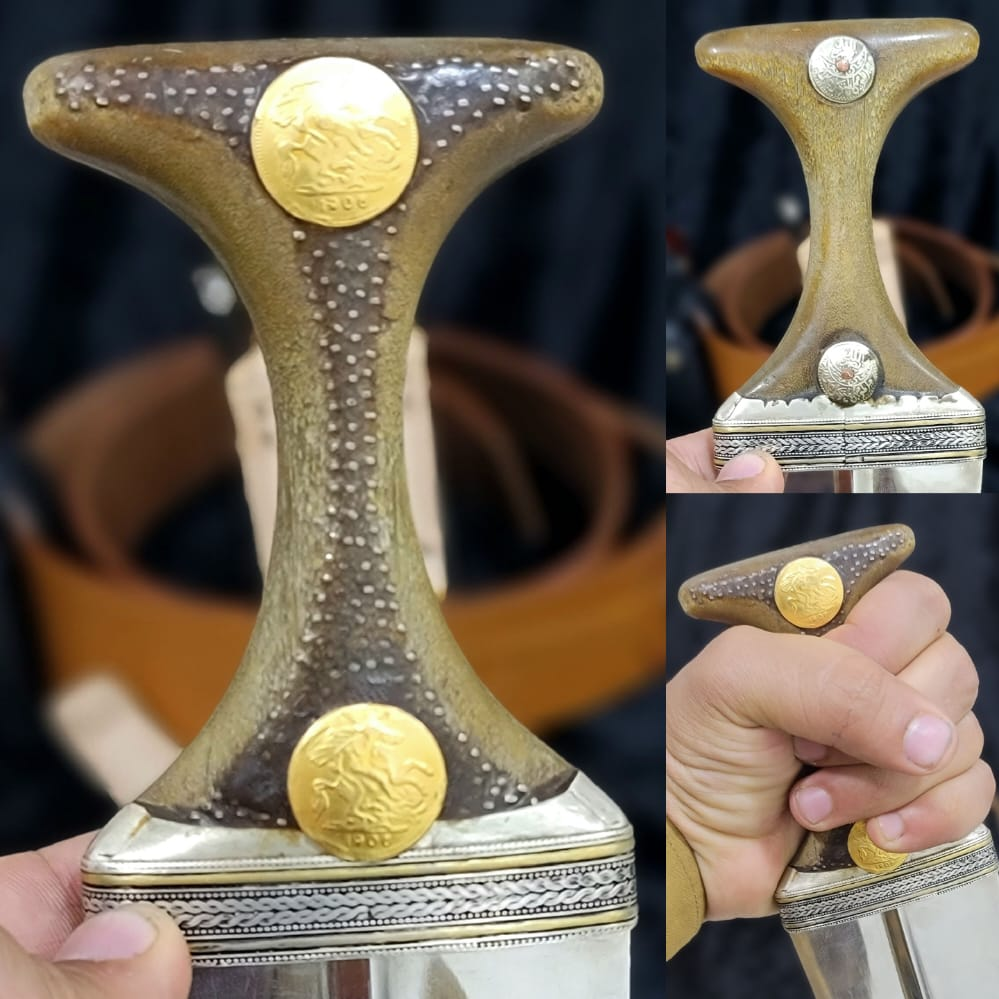
Handle of a Jambiya

The most famous type of jambiya is that which has a saifani or ivory handle; it has a dim yellowish lustre. The more translucent ivory will turn a yellow colour with age and is called "saifani heart". Some of the ivory handles are called asadi when they turn into a greenish yellow. When the handle becomes whitish yellow, it is called zaraf. There is also an albasali ("onionish") kind, the colour of which resembles that of a white onion.

The ivory handle jambiya is often worn as a sign of high social status. They are typically used by most Yemeni people, except those in the coastal cities of Aden and Mukalla where most of them have given up using it because it was banned during the rule of the Yemeni Socialist Party in South Yemen. The jambiya hasn't been reserved in use for a particular class of person in the country but the valuable ones can be found with particularly influential persons like judges, famous merchants and businessmen.

Antique jambiyas that have been worn by historically significant people can fetch exorbitant prices like that of the Sheikh of Bakil, Sheikh Al-Shaif, which goes back to Imam Yahya Muhammad Hamid ed-Din and was reported to have cost US$1,000,000 when bought in 1992.

== See also ==
- Khanjar
- Shotel
- Keris
- Jile
