= Jile =

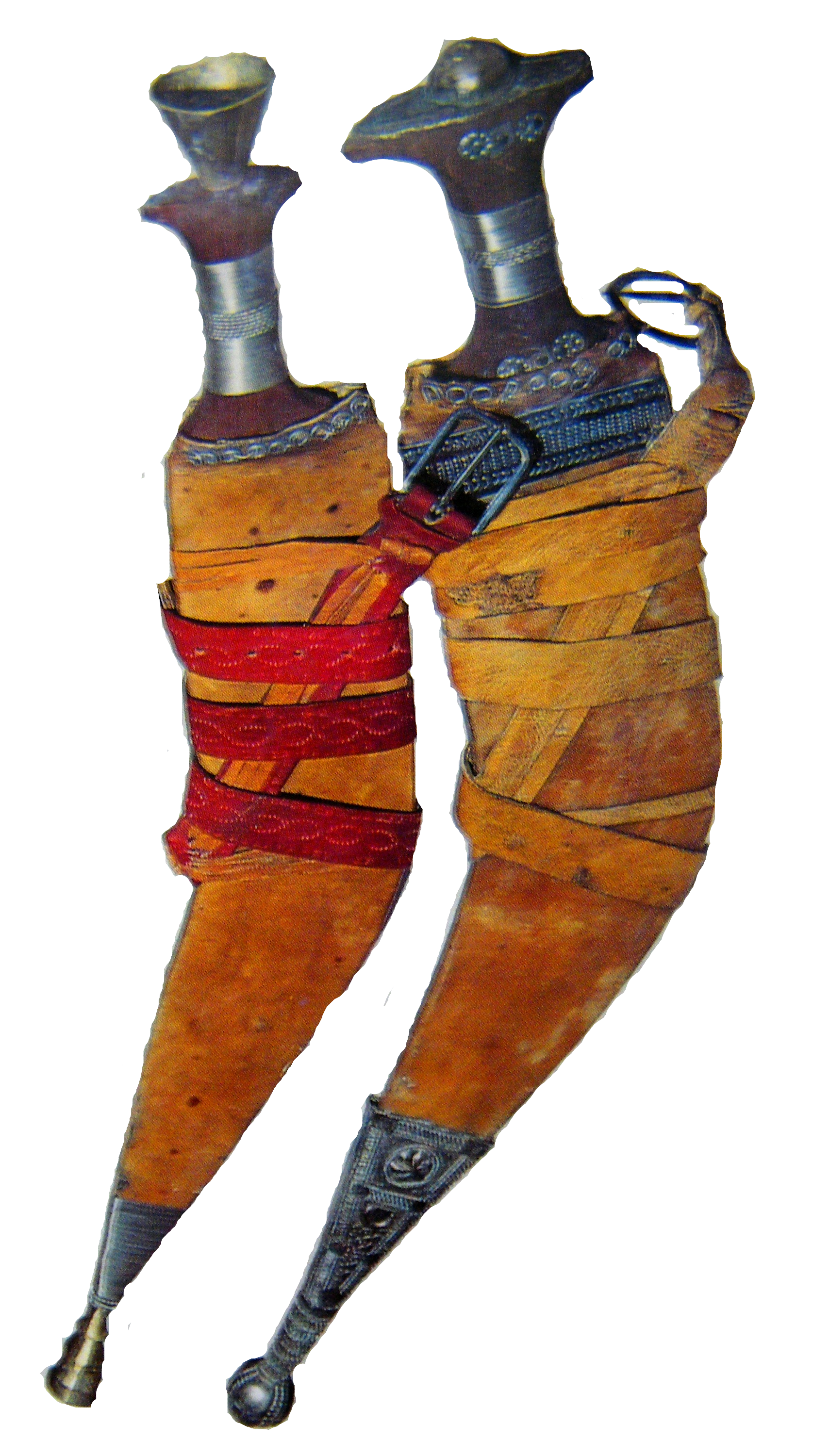
- Type: Dagger
- Place of origin: Horn of Africa (Djibouti, Ethiopia, Somalia, and Eritrea)

Specifications
- Blade type: double-edged curved blade

The Jile (in Afar: Gile, and Somali: Qolxad), is a type of dagger with a long curved blade used by the Somali and Afar people found in Djibouti, Ethiopia, Somalia, and Eritrea. Unique to the Horn of Africa, it is the most famous and characteristic of Afar and Somali daggers. It can be made from a variety of different materials, depending on the quality of its craftsmanship. A national symbol of the republic, the Jile-Qolxad is featured on Djibouti's national emblem and on the Djiboutian franc.

== Names ==
The dagger is known as Jile or Gile in Afar and Qolxad in Somali.

== Overview ==
The Jile is a curved dagger ranging in length from 30 centimetres (12 in) to more than 50 centimetres (20 in). The handle is typically made of wood or more rarely from buffalo or rhinoceros horn. The pommel often ends with three teeth of bronze, zinc or silver. The middle tooth is the most prominent. The double-edged blade is shaped like an asymmetrical leaf and today is typically made from salvaged metal, usually iron or steel from broken car and truck springs. The sheath is made of wood wrapped in leather, though it can sometimes have brass plates attached near the handle. The sheath always has an extra long tip, sometimes embellished with metal upholstery that can have an enlarged knob on the end. The sheath is worn on a belt around the waist and attached to the belt with a circular or square buckle or more rarely sown on. The dagger's handle often indicates the social status of the person who wears it. The concave side of the blade is used to cut.

== Use ==
It is commonly used in traditional events, such as dances, though it is still a weapon and has been used in times of dispute. However, there are societal and Islamic norms that must be followed in order to avoid defamation. The Qolxad or Jile should only come out of its sheath in extreme cases of conflict.

The Jile is an integral part of being an Afar and Somali nomad in the Horn of Africa. It is one of the indispensable paraphernalia of the nomad. It serves as both a weapon of self-defense, useful object, and adornment that is the pride of the nomadic warrior and is also considered a symbol of virility. The jile is used to slaughter sheep, carve wood, and cut hair. Craftsmen or blacksmiths of traditional knives have long been a highly respected trade but have also been a symbol of the artisanal heritage of Djibouti.

== See also ==
- Billao, the traditional Somali shortsword or long dagger
- Shotel, the traditional Ethiopian sicklesword
- Jambiya, the traditional Yemeni dagger
- Keris
- Khanjar
- Pulwar
- Shamshir
- Zulfiqar
