= Murder of Eva Blanco =

1981 murder in Madrid, Spain

Background information – victim
- Born: Eva Blanco Puig; 17 February 1981; Madrid, Spain
- Died: 20 April 1997 (aged 16); Algete, Spain

Case information
- Attack type: Stabbing, sexual assault
- Cause of death: Exsanguination caused by multiple stab wounds
- Funeral: Asunción de Nuestra Señora, Algete, Spain
- Arrested: Ahmed Chelh Gerj (1 October 2015)
- Convicted: None; case closed after Chelh's suicide on 29 January 2016

On 20 April 1997, Eva Blanco Puig, a Spanish high school student was murdered in Algete, Madrid. The case remained unsolved for over a decade, gaining significant media attention in Spain and is popularly known as the Eva Blanco Case (Caso Eva Blanco), the Crime of Algete (Crimen de Algete) or Operation Gang (Operación Pandilla), the code name given to the investigation by the Spanish Civil Guard.

In 2013, new advancements in genealogical DNA research led to the determination that the suspect had North African origins. Hundreds of people with North African origins that had lived in the Algete community subsequently contributed their DNA profile to help the investigative effort; one of the donors showed a sibling-level match with the perpetrator, and further investigations eventually led to the arrest of Ahmed Chelh Gerj, a Moroccan-Spanish citizen who had lived in Algete with his brother in 1997.

Chelh committed suicide in prison in 2016, and the case was closed.

== Disappearance ==
Eva Blanco (born 17 February 1981) played tennis with her friends during the afternoon of 19 April. At night, the group stayed in a local disco until 23:30, when they prepared to return home. Blanco, who had agreed to return at midnight, was among the first to separate from the rest. A female friend accompanied her to a vacant lot some 700 meters from Blanco's home in the Valderrey residential area, before they parted ways at 23:45. Blanco intended to walk across the vacant lot as a shortcut to her home, avoiding a longer detour through the town center, but she never reached her destination. The same shortcut was used by her and other Valderrey students regularly to get to high school. Because Blanco had always been on time before, her mother became worried and she called Blanco's friends, who told her that she had already left. She alerted her husband, a tow truck driver, who searched for her in the town with the help of his nephew, a local police officer, and the father of one of Blanco's friends. Finding no trace of her, the parents reported her disappearance at the local Civil Guard station at 1:00 AM, but the officers were apathetic about filing a disappearance after little over an hour. The guard at the door even said that children of her age were all on drugs and she was probably lying in some doorway.

By 2:30, Blanco's family, friends, Civil Guards and the local police began her search in Algete and the area leading to nearby Fuente el Saz de Jarama, although a missing report was not filed by the Civil Guard until 8:00. At 12:00, the family contacted the regional TV station Telemadrid and requested its help publicizing the case.

Blanco's father visited the local Civil Guard station fifteen times during the night and criticized the institution for not searching the rural roads or using vehicles in the search before sunrise, except for a short 20 minutes run around Valderrey. He claimed that they did not do it earlier because they did not have the gas. The Civil Guard denied the accusation and said that it was customary to wait some hours between a missing person report and its search.

== Investigation ==
=== Discovery of body ===
Blanco's body was found the next day by two elderly Ajalvir residents at 9:00 AM, next to a road construction site between Cobeña and Belvis de Jarama, six kilometers away from Algete. The residents thought that she might have been run over by a car, but the Civil Guard noticed that the victim, lying face down on the ground, had actually been stabbed several times in the back while she tried to run away from an attacker. The body was dressed with the same jeans, dark sweater and mountain boots that Blanco was wearing when she disappeared, with only one sleeve of her jacket taken off. Both killer and victim were also assumed to have reached the area in a vehicle, although abundant rain in the night of the murder had washed out any tire tracks and most other forensic evidence. Nevertheless, some footprints from the victim and a man wearing size 42 moccasins survived.

The Civil Guard notified Blanco's family of the discovery at 15:30. The news caused commotion in Algete, a town of just 12,300 people, with no recent instances of violent crime. At 19:00, 200 people gathered silently before Blanco's home to condemn her murder. Blanco's funeral on 23 April was attended by 2,000 people.

=== Autopsy report ===
The autopsy report showed that Blanco was stabbed in the back 19 times before dying from blood loss around 4:00 AM. The murder weapon was a navaja between 8 and 10 centimetres long and 1 cm wide. The first stab to the side of the body was made while she was sitting in a vehicle and the rest after she exited it and tried to run up the slope next to the road. Many of these later wounds, mostly found on Blanco's ear and back of the head were superficial and interpreted as "passionate." In contrast, the first injury was deep and may have been fatal even in the absence of all others. Blanco's hymen was torn and the same man's semen was found in her mouth, vagina and underwear. A red fibre was also retrieved from Blanco's mouth, and subsequently identified by the Catalonia Textile Museum and Documentation Centre as belonging to a common type of car upholstery, confirming that Blanco had been in a vehicle after her disappearance.

=== First theories ===
Because the body was found dressed and showed no previous signs of violence, both coroner and officers believed that the sex had been consensual and that the murder was the result of an argument after. In contrast, Blanco's parents thought that their daughter had been kidnapped and raped at knifepoint, then murdered to avoid prosecution for the previous crime.

The Civil Guard initially believed that the case would be closed after a short investigation. The dominant theory was that a single person known to Blanco had approached her in a car, offered her a ride which she accepted, and took her to the construction site, a known lovers lane, where they had sex before she was murdered. The first suspect was Blanco's ex-boyfriend, a resident of Fuente el Saz who had recently broken up with her. However, he was ruled out after being questioned by police. Afterward, the investigation centered on adult men known to Blanco's family and that she might trust. On 29 May, the government announced that the Civil Guard found the case more complicated than expected and that it no longer excluded a stranger as the perpetrator. Blanco's friends claimed that she would never accept a ride from a stranger and that she must have been forced into the car. Other neighbors linked the crime to a strange blue car seen in the town following another girl around midnight, one of whose occupiers was a blond man around twenty years old. However, nobody recorded the car's plates.

The existence of semen was kept from Blanco's family and the public while the officers retrieved DNA samples from Blanco's male relatives and acquaintances, all in secret, and compared it to the semen's DNA. Blanco's father's sample was extracted from a cigarette that he had smoked and left behind while drinking coffee and discussing the case with Civil Guard officers; others were taken under the guise of unrelated blood alcohol content tests or from cups and glasses used in bars. Although no matches were made, the Civil Guard remained convinced that the killer was an adult male resident in Algete or a nearby town.

=== 'Secret diaries' ===
Eight months after the crime, Blanco's mother found two notebooks hidden between drawers in her daughter's room. They were labeled "95-96" and "96-97", and were handwritten by the victim until the day of her murder. Many of these pages contained nothing but "Eva and Miguel", the name of her ex-boyfriend, repeated over and over in different pen colors. Two pages before the last one's end, however, "Eva and Miguel" were replaced by "Eva and 343110". All attempts to discover the meaning of "343110" were unsuccessful, with some hypothesis revolving around the fact that "34" is the phone prefix of Spain, and "110" is Algete's postal code. Blanco's father believed that it was the number of a pager given in a Coca-Cola promotion at the time, while others believed that it was a coded name.

=== Proposed mass DNA test ===
After being informed that his DNA had been compared to semen found in his daughter's body and excluded him as a suspect, Blanco's father began to campaign for other Algete residents to provide voluntary DNA samples in an effort to help catch his daughter's killer. In this project he was backed by Algete's Mayor, Jesús Herrera Fernández (PSOE), who made an official announcement in November 1999, petitioning all male residents of Algete over 16 years of age (est. 5,000) to provide voluntary hair or saliva samples if they wished to. The proposition was unanimously rejected by Spanish judicial organizations who considered it "simple-minded," "disproportionate," "useless," and a potential stigma for Algete residents who refused to provide a DNA sample without court order and were in their legal right to do so. Nevertheless, Blanco's father received 2,013 samples from residents of Algete and nearby towns and deposited them in the local courthouse until it was decided what to do with them. The case's examining magistrate requested a report from Madrid's chief prosecutor on the legal feasibility of such test. The response, issued on 30 March 2000, was that testing should only be done on samples of people who could be deemed suspicious according to the investigation, and not just volunteers. Only samples from 45 people were tested, including 12 relatives of Blanco on her father's side, six on her mother's side, her acquaintances and any people with a previous criminal record, with special attention to cases of sexual misconduct and knife violence.

== New evidence and renewed media interest ==
By 2007, 30 officers had worked in the case and information on similar cases had been requested from other law enforcement offices including the Ertzaintza and the FBI. A specialist from the University of Santiago de Compostela re-examined the DNA evidence and concluded that it belonged to a man not of European descent. Six years later, in 2013, the number of people investigated had risen to 1,503, and 208 men from Algete and other towns had had their DNA tested, including criminals who were on leave at the time of the murder. A new examining magistrate allowed the opening and checking of the 2,013 envelopes containing the names of the volunteers from 1999, but not the testing of all DNA samples.

=== Eva: Un expediente abierto ===
On 26 April 2013 La Sexta's investigative show Equipo de Investigación aired a program about the case with the title Eva: Un expediente abierto ("Eva: A cold case"). The program recapitulated the known evidence and included interviews with Blanco's parents, friends, teachers, officers working on the case and Vicente Garrido Genovés, a psychologist and criminologist who gained notoriety when he helped identify serial killer Joaquín Ferrándiz Ventura in Castellón in 1998. Garrido disagreed with the Civil Guard's theory that the murderer was a "secret boyfriend" of Blanco, arguing that she would not agree to meet a lover 15 minutes before her curfew because of the risk of exposing such relationship. His criminal profile was a stalker who was not known or barely known to Blanco. The lack of defensive wounds could be explained because of the victim being threatened before agreeing to have sex with the attacker. The criminal would be of low intelligence, uneducated, with a low-skilled profession and emotionally immature, since he sought sex with a teenager rather than a woman closer in age. He probably had no family because they would have noticed him coming late and inquired him about it. It was also possible that he continued his criminal career elsewhere in Spain and that he was in prison for other attacks.

=== Facial composite ===
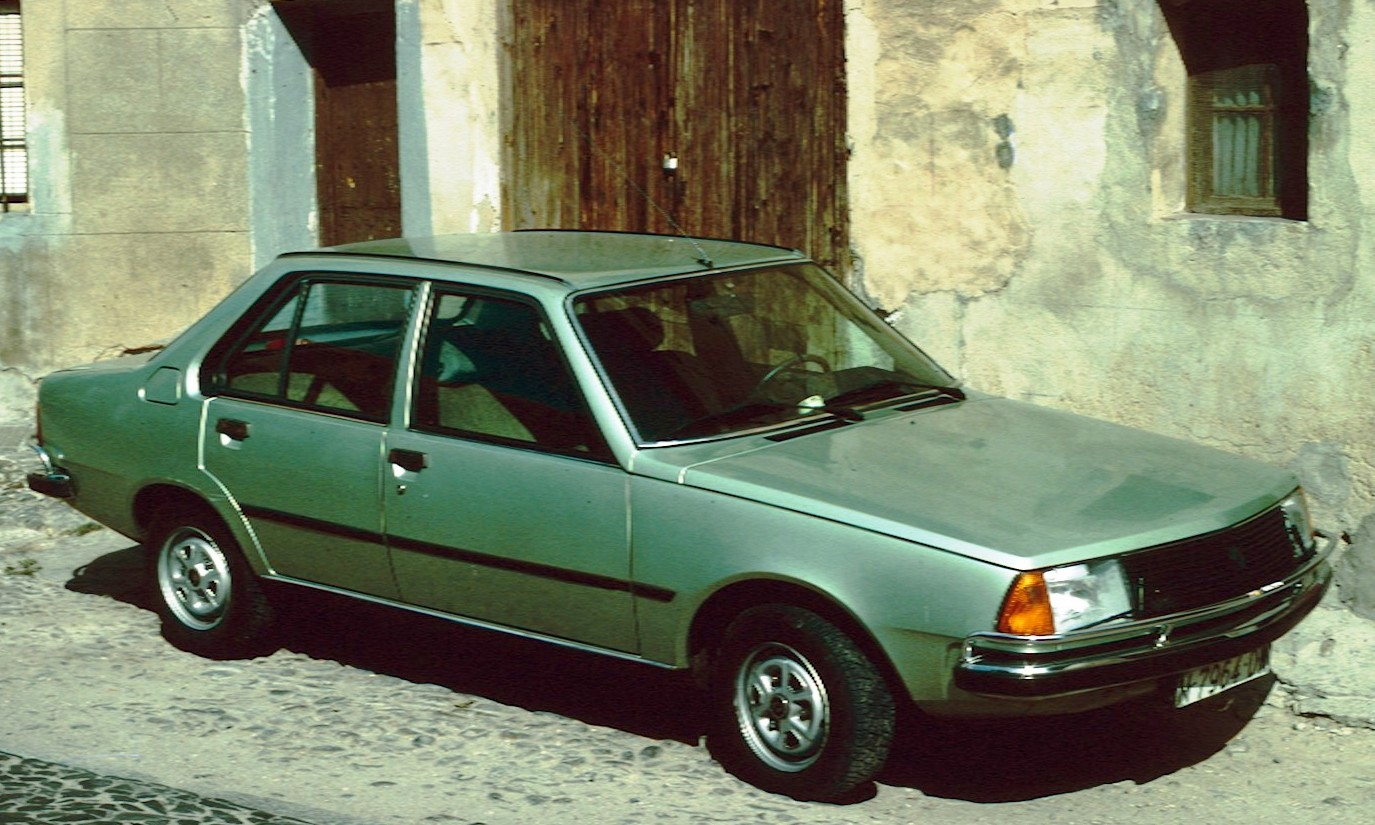
A Spanish Renault 18

After watching the program, a woman reported to authorities that she had seen a suspicious man in the road construction site around 8:00 AM. He was walking in the rain with no umbrella, looked like he had not slept during the night, and appeared to be looking for something before he got in a white Renault 18. The Civil Guard deemed the testimony reliable, in part because a Renault 18 had been reported by other witnesses over the years and the model was compatible with the fiber retrieved from Blanco's body. On 28 October 2013 the Civil Guard released a facial composite made in collaboration with the new witness. The suspect was a man who was between 35 and 40 years old in 1997; 1.70 to 1.80 meters tall; corpulent, between 75 and 80 kg; with short, spiky, brown hair; square and hardened face; dark, sunken eyes; wore a white shirt and a V-neck sweater; and drove a white Renault 18 with red upholstery. A confidential phone number and e-mail address were created for possible tips. By 1 January 2014, 100 e-mails had been received.

== Arrest of Ahmed Chelh Gerj ==
=== Identification ===
At the end of 2013, a new revision of the semen's DNA narrowed the identity of the donor to a man of North African descent. The Civil Guard petitioned the 300 North African men living in Algete in 1997 to provide voluntary samples. Their response was overwhelmingly positive, even though many had left the town and even the country in the intervening years. Fouad Chelh, a former resident of Blanco's neighborhood now living in southern France, shared his Y chromosome and over 97% of his nuclear DNA with the killer. This was only possible if both men were siblings. After the sample of a brother of Chelh living in Murcia and who had never resided in Algete provided an identical result, a European arrest warrant was issued for the third Chelh brother, Ahmed Chelh Gerj. On 1 October 2015 Ahmed was arrested outside his workplace in Besançon, France, during a joint intervention of the Civil Guard and the French Gendarmerie.

=== Suspect ===
Ahmed Chelh Gerj, 52, was born in Taza, Morocco on 1 March 1963. He was 34 years old at the time of the murder. Chelh married in Madrid to a 20-year old Spanish woman in 1989 and became a Spanish citizen in the 1990s. They had three children in 1989, 1993 and 1997. His wife was five months pregnant with their third child when Blanco was murdered. The Chelhs were never listed as residents of Algete because they lived in a caravan parked in a plant nursery where Chelh worked as a deliveryman, and which had been lent to them by Chelh's employer. Chelh's residence, next to the Paracuellos de Jarama-Fuente el Saz road, was four kilometers away from the murder scene. The Chelhs moved to France in 1999. Though they continued to be listed as married in Spain, they separated amicably and Chelh remarried to a 24-year-old Moroccan student in Besançon in 2003. Chelh and his new wife settled in Pierrefontaine-les-Varans, a village 20 kilometers from the Swiss border, and had two children that were six-years-old and an infant at the time of his arrest. While in France, he worked as a welder for a farm machinery company and his relationship with coworkers was reputed to be poor.

When told about the DNA evidence, Chelh claimed that he had gone out for a walk alone and that two unidentified men had grabbed him, brought him to Blanco's body and forced him to masturbate over it. His ex-wife, however, told journalists that he had left in the company of his brothers, as they used to do in the weekends. She claimed that no one ever told her about that night until after Chelh's arrest, when a brother said that they had been at the same disco as Blanco, and that they talked to her after she had an argument with her ex-boyfriend. Blanco left the disco with the brothers at one point, but she went back inside with her friends around 23:00. Chelh's ex-wife also claimed that neither the police nor the Civil Guard had ever interrogated her or the brothers in the course of the investigation. Both her and her youngest son denied that Chelh had ever mistreated them, but she later admitted that Chelh became aggressive when he drank. Blanco's family never met Chelh and they interacted sporadically with his brother at most. A former coworker at the plant nursery described Chelh as not very social, aggressive after drinking, and "a little pervy" with women. Former female customers also remembered him as "a pervert, the kind that makes you feel bad when he's near."

=== Prosecution ===
On 5 October, Chelh unsuccessfully tried to cut his jugular vein with a small glass in his cell, yet he accepted to be deported to Spain to stand trial two days later. On 9 October, Chelh landed in Torrejón Air Base under the custody of the Civil Guard. At the preliminary hearing on 13 October, Chelh declined to make a statement but he agreed to give a DNA sample, following the advice of his lawyer in both cases. He was formally charged with murder, rape, and illegal detention, and was recluded in Soto del Real prison pending trial, after a request from his lawyer to release him until the DNA results came in was denied. Testing confirmed Chelh as the origin of the incriminating semen beyond doubt.

On 19 October, Chelh's defence unsuccessfully requested his release pending trial. Chelh's lawyer argued that there was no evidence tying his client to the crime besides DNA, that the hypothesis worked for the past 18 years by the Civil Guard was that Blanco had willingly boarded the car of an adult known to her, and that she had consensual sex before she was killed, according to the same investigation. As a result, it either made no sense to charge Chelh with rape, or to believe that Blanco would have agreed to get in a car with a Moroccan, given her friends' insistence that she would never board the car of a stranger. The lawyer claimed that Blanco would never go willingly with a Moroccan because she harbored neo-Nazi sympathies, as indicated by imagery present in her diaries, and reminded that the investigation had focused early on the neo-Nazi group Bases Autónomas. Blanco's friends denied that she had any relation with neo-Nazis. Chelh's first wife fueled the conspiracy theory in an interview with TVE's La Mañana, where she claimed that there were "several people involved" and that the Chelhs knew who was "behind it all", "more or less." She claimed this time that Chelh came back home between 22:00 and 23:00, that he would not stay out late because she was pregnant, and that he told her that some boys had mugged him, but that he did not want to denounce it because he was afraid.

On 8 January 2016 a team of prison psychiatrists and psychologists supported the lifting of anti-suicide measures placed on Chelh since his arrest, as he had repeatedly requested himself. At the next hearing on 15 January, Chelh claimed that two people forced him into a car and threatened him with a navaja in order to make him ejaculate over Blanco, who was inside alive. He insisted that he never penetrated her, but when asked why his semen was found inside the body, he could not answer.

=== Death ===
On 29 January, Chelh was found dead in his cell at Alcalá-Meco prison, having hanged himself with his shoelaces. The prosecution was formally ended on 15 February.

== See also ==
- List of solved missing person cases
- Murder of Rosana Maroto
- Murder of Rocío Wanninkhof
- Murder of Marta del Castillo
