= Ramón Laso =

Spanish serial killer

- Born: Ramón Laso Moreno; 1955 (age 70–71); Jaén, Spain
- Other names: The Amposta Parricide; The Els Pallaresos Killer
- Penalty: 56 years of prison (1993); 30 years of prison (2014)

Details
- Victims: 4
- Span of crimes: 1988–2009
- Country: Spain
- State: Tarragona province
- Date apprehended: 30 March 2011

Ramón Laso Moreno (born 1955) is a Spanish serial killer convicted in 1993 for the murders of his first wife and six-year-old son, and in 2014 for the murders of his second wife and brother-in-law. The second conviction has been named as the first murder conviction in Spain without a confession, murder weapon, body, or any organic remains of the victims. Laso disputes the validity of other forensic evidence and continues to claim his innocence.

== Early life ==
Laso was born in Jaén, Spain in 1955, although he lived most of his life in Tarragona province. In the 1980s he lived with his wife Dolores "Lolita" Camacho (b. 1963) and their two children in Amposta, Tarragona. Laso and his brother-in-law Miguel Camacho ran a brothel in a four-room farmyard, with Laso acting as the pimp and recruiter of prostitutes. The partnership ended after Laso and Camacho had an argument during which Laso destroyed several mirrors, lights and other items in the place. In addition to his relationship with prostitutes, Laso was also unfaithful to his wife with other women.

== First murders ==
Laso's wife was found decapitated by a train in Amposta Station shortly after midnight on 9 June 1988. The death was considered a suicide in spite of the Camacho's suspicions about Laso. Nine months later, Laso's car fell off a 20-meter cliff while transporting Laso and his six-year-old son. Laso was unharmed, despite claiming to have fallen off the cliff and been left unconscious for 15 minutes as a result of the incident, while his son was killed and incinerated. The car insurance provided Laso with 3.5 million pesetas that he used to establish a video rental store. Miguel Camacho feared that Laso intended to kill the whole family one by one, and hired a private investigator to find evidence that Laso had actually killed his wife and child. The PI proved that Laso had actually strangled his wife and that she was already dead when the train hit her. An indicator of this was that Camacho had not instinctively lifted her head as the train approached, unlike all deceased in known instances of suicide on train tracks. He also set his car on fire himself. Laso offered multiple versions of the events to law enforcement, and while he ultimately admitted to staging both "accidents", he never confessed to a murder. He was found guilty on trial and sentenced to 56 years in prison for both murders in 1993. Nonetheless, he was paroled already in 1999, citing good behaviour during his incarceration.

== Later murders ==
After his release, Laso worked as an undertaker, ambulance driver and barman. He married Julia Lamas, a Tarragona building caretaker who didn't know about his criminal past. Nonetheless, Laso also had affairs with other women including Lamas's sister Mercedes, who was herself married to Maurici Font. Laso suggested to Mercedes several times that they should divorce their respective spouses and move in together, but she refused. On 29 March 2009, Laso met Font in an orchard property of the former that both men tended to as a hobby; afterwards, Laso picked his wife up at her workplace. Neither Font nor Lamas were ever seen again. Font, a retired hospital watchman, would often pick his wife up at the hospital where she worked at as a nurse, but he didn't show up that day. Instead, it was Laso who went to the place at 3:30 pm and told her that Font had an affair with his sister-in-law and that the two had run away together to never come back. At the time, Laso was sweaty, looked tired, was missing his glasses and had a scratch on the bridge of his nose, which fueled Mercedes's suspicions. They went to the residences of both people missing, where she noticed that most of their items were still in their place, including Julia Lamas's car. Mercedes said that they should report the disappearances to the Mossos d'Esquadra, but Laso talked her out of it, insisting that it was a voluntary disappearance. Nevertheless, Mercedes denounced the disappearances the next day after talking to a female friend and shared her suspicions about Laso.

The Mossos interrogated Laso several times. He was always collaborative and accused Mercedes of lying. In one of the interrogations, Laso revealed that Font had called his mother from Morella, Castellón, where Lamas's adult son from a previous marriage lived, and told her to not worry about them, that they were starting a new life together and that Lamas had a new job in a local retirement home. Lamas's son later testified that Laso had travelled to Morella and attempted to talk to him, but that he had ignored him. Sometime later, "Font" called the offices of the Diari de Tarragona from Morella, stating the same plus the fact that he had left in disgust after discovering that his wife was unfaithful, and requested that the investigation on their disappearance be closed. He also sent a fax to the Social Security office to request that his monthly pension be deposited in a new bank account. The fax included a copy of Font's National Identity Document (DNI), but the accompanying signature was not his own. Laso also tried to usurp the job of Julia Lamas as the building caretaker.

When GPS and mobile phone tracking showed that Laso had been at the time and place where all the communications had been sent from, the missing persons investigation was reworked as a murder investigation and Laso was arrested as the suspect. The Mossos searched Laso's orchard extensively, along with his bar (where he dug a hole in the basement after the disappearances) and the Amposta cemetery where he had worked as an undertaker and his first family was buried. GPS showed that he had driven to the cemetery once at 1:30 am, after being in his orchard, but the bodies were never found. At Laso's home, the Mossos found Lamas's glasses, a colour copy of her DNI, the prepaid mobile phone used to call the Diari, and a crowbar and hoe that tested positive for haemoglobin. However, no usable DNA could be retrieved from the tools for comparison.

In 2010, after the disappearances but prior to his arrest, Laso had a relationship with another woman and attempted to start yet another simultaneously with a recently divorced neighbour. When the neighbour refused, Laso sneaked into her basement and left a rose taped to a dead bird. The next day, the woman had a car accident and was informed that someone had manipulated the brakes.

== Trial and sentence ==
Laso manifested several times that he looked forward to the trial, believing that no jury could condemn him of murder without a body. However, he was pronounced guilty of both counts and subsequently sentenced to 30 years in prison, in 2014. The Supreme Court of Spain upheld the sentence in 2016.

Laso's orchard was expropriated after the investigation and a road was built over it.

== In media ==
Laso's murders and their investigation were the subject of the book Sin Cadáver ("Without a Body"), by Spanish journalist and criminologist Fátima Llambrich.

== See also ==
- Murder of Marta del Castillo
- Joaquín Ferrándiz Ventura
- List of murder convictions without a body
- List of serial killers by country
