= Murder of Marta del Castillo =

2009 murder in Spain

- Photo of Del Castillo
- Location: Seville, Andalusia, Spain
- Date: January 24, 2009
- Attack type: Murder
- Victim: Marta del Castillo
- Perpetrator: Miguel Carcaño
- Charges: Miguel Carcaño: Murder; Francisco Javier García: False testimony
- Verdict: Guilty
- Sentence: 21 years in prison (Carcaño); 2 years in prison (García)

On January 24, 2009, 17-year-old Marta del Castillo Casanueva (born July 19, 1991), a Spanish high school student went missing after leaving her home in Seville, Andalusia. Her disappearance led to an extensive search and garnered national publicity surrounding her case. The prime suspect, Del Castillo's ex-boyfriend Miguel Carcaño Delgado, has made different statements over the years about his involvement in her murder and the location of her body. Despite numerous searches, Del Castillo's remains were never found.

Five people were arrested in connection with the disappearance, but only two were convicted. In 2011, Carcaño was convicted for the murder of Del Castillo and sentenced to 21 years in prison.

== Disappearance ==
On January 24, 2009, Marta del Castillo was engaged in an online chat with a friend, Silvia Fernández, through Microsoft Messenger. Del Castillo left the conversation with the line Gordaaa t djo q sta l migue abajo y bvoy a abal con el luego t llamo y t cnto ttQ ("Fatty, I leave you because [e]l Migue is downstairs and I'm going to talk to him. I'll call you later and tell you about it. Love you."). "El Migue" was the nickname of 19-year-old Miguel Carcaño Delgado, a boy she had been casually seeing for approximately one month. Around 17:00, Del Castillo told her family that she would spend the evening with friends and left her home on Argantonio Street in Seville.

When Del Castillo failed to return home, her family called her cellphone, but she didn't respond. They then contacted her friends, including eventual suspects in her disappearance, including Carcaño and Samuel Benítez. Carcaño admitted that he had seen Del Castillo that evening but claimed that he had left her near the entrance of her apartment block around 21:30. Del Castillo's mother was suspicious and told Carcaño that she'd "throw the police over" him if something had happened to her daughter.

Carcaño attracted further suspicions from the family when he suddenly moved to nearby Camas instead of joining the search effort. There he resided with a new girlfriend, 14-year-old Rocío P. G., and her family. Del Castillo's friends subsequently searched the Seville apartment Carcaño had previously occupied with his older half-brother, Francisco Javier Delgado Moreno, where they noticed a strong smell of bleach and ammonia.

== Investigation ==
The case was investigated by the Underage People Task Force (Grupo de Menores) of the Spanish National Police (CNP). After Carcaño's confession, it was joined by the Homicide Task Force (Grupo de Homicidios). Carcaño initially denied any role in Del Castillo's disappearance under repeated interrogations. However, P. G. claimed to have seen blood on Carcaño's pants, and blood found in the lining of Carcaño's jacket was matched to Del Castillo. A luminol test at Carcaño's former apartment also revealed a large bloodstain on the bedroom floor.

=== Carcaño's first version of the murder ===
Upon hearing of his P. G.'s testimony and of the existence of forensic evidence, Carcaño collapsed and confessed to the murder on February 14. According to this first testimony, Carcaño murdered Del Castillo during an argument on the night of January 24 over his relationship with P. G. The murder weapon was a heavy ashtray which was never found, but which Carcaño claimed to have used to hit Del Castillo on the left side of the parietal bone, killing her. He also claimed to have called a friend, Samuel Benítez Pérez, from a payphone outside his apartment, requesting his help moving the body to Camas. Once there, Carcaño and Benítez threw the body in the Guadalquivir River near a point called Charco de la Pava. Despite this admission, police suspected that Carcaño was not telling the whole truth. Among other things, he claimed that the vehicle used to move the body was his own moped, but tests showed that it was not stable enough to transport three people in that area, even without accounting for one of them being dead.

=== Arrests ===
On February 16, Spanish Minister of the Interior Alfredo Pérez-Rubalcaba announced that Carcaño and Benítez were both arrested under charges of homicide and illegal detention. Also arrested were Carcaño's half-brother Delgado and a 15-year old friend of Carcaño and Benítez, later identified as Francisco Javier García Marín.

=== Guadalquivir River search ===
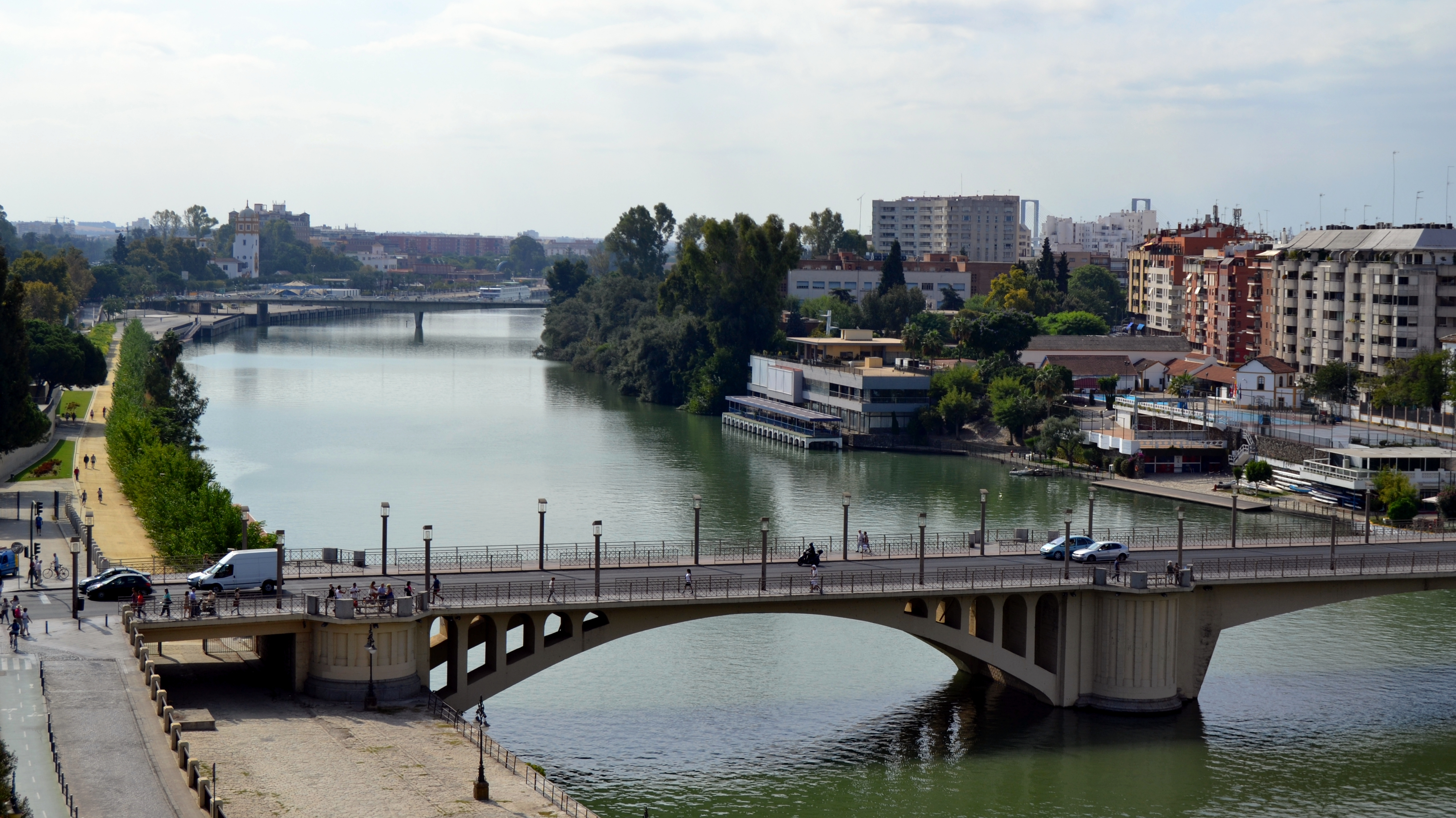
Bridges across the Guadalquivir River in Seville.

Specialist Groups, and the Military Emergencies Unit, searched the Guadalquivir between Camas and the estuary at Sanlúcar de Barrameda, using twenty-two vessels, three jet skis, two helicopters, thirteen scent hounds, sonar and specialized underwater body retrieval technology lent by the Dutch police. A Gelves dock engineer also designed, built and volunteered a rake-like tool capable of removing mud from the bottom of the river.

Three separate tests with pig carcasses weighing fifty kilograms were made. The bodies submerged several times, but in all three cases, they ended on the surface and stuck in a particular stretch of riverbank that was only twenty kilometers long. However, no trace of Del Castillo was found. Police worked with the hypothesis that the large volume of the Guadalquivir in January and the three weeks between the murder and Carcaño's confession had been enough to either wash the body out to sea before the search began or to entomb it in the bottom mud, which can be two meters thick in some areas. A "bloodstained cloth" found in an irrigation canal near Camas was revealed to be just painted red after testing.

=== "El Cuco"'s version ===
In his own testimony, which he later recanted, García stated that he arrived in Carcaño's apartment with Benítez, where they found Carcaño wrapping Del Castillo's body in a blanket under the supervision of Delgado. Delgado then threatened García into silence and stayed at the apartment to clean the evidence while the other three disposed of the body. Police believed Delgado planned the strategy to follow after the murder, based on this testimony and phone conversations between Carcaño and Delgado while both were in remand. In one conversation, Delgado told Carcaño to "say nothing, because the police has nothing."

=== Carcaño's second version ===
On March 18, during the customary reconstruction of the crime at the Seville apartment, Carcaño surprised police when he requested to recant his previous testimony and make a new one. In this second statement, Carcaño blamed the murder on García, saying that he had strangled Del Castillo in Delgado's living room while Carcaño was in the bedroom under the influence of "substances." Afterward, he phoned Benítez and they disposed of the body in a dumpster in the cross between León XIII and Jorge de Montemayor streets, near the apartment.

Carcaño claimed that he had felt pressured by detectives to make his first testimony. Following this second testimony, the other three accused were requested to make new statements of their own, and they were confronted with Carcaño and each other to study their reaction. Benítez and García claimed to not be involved at all, and to not have visited the apartment on the day of the crime. García's lawyer called Carcaño's second statement a joke and insisted his client was innocent. Also critical was Del Castillo's father, Antonio, who accused the suspects of being deliberately misleading about the body's location because they were hiding additional crimes against his daughter. Antonio speculated that his daughter had been cremated in an incinerator where P. G.'s father had been employed in previously.

Because of Carcaño's new statement, the search team was alerted and directed from the river to the Montemarta-Cónica landfill near Alcalá de Guadaíra, where the trash generated in the city of Seville is processed.

=== Carcaño's third version ===
On March 19, confronted with the "unbelievability" of the crime reconstruction at the Seville apartment, Carcaño requested to recant and make yet another statement before the examining magistrate. This time he said that he had been drinking, smoking and taking drugs with Del Castillo and García in the apartment. According to this account, the two males attempted to have sex with Del Castillo; when she resisted, both men beat her and took her to the bedroom, where Carcaño and García took turns raping her. Afterwards, they tied her to the bed with insulating tape and the cord from a heart monitor. Carcaño punched her hard enough to make her bleed, and they strangled her together. The body was disguised with two trash bags, moved out of the apartment on a wheelchair previously used by Carcaño's deceased mother and thrown in the dumpster while García disposed of the knife on a sewer.

Though authorities were not entirely convinced by this version, it explained the finding of the knife in the sewer in front of the apartment, the presence of Del Castillo's blood and DNA of both Carcaño and García in the bedroom, the finding of DNA belonging to both Carcaño and Del Castillo in the wheelchair's handlers and the testimony of a neighbor who had met Carcaño when he returned to the building with the empty wheelchair.

Witnesses to the statement claimed that Carcaño had looked the magistrate in the eye for the first time and appeared to have taken a load off his mind after he was finished. His lawyer refused to continue representing him after this point. When asked about why he had implicated Benítez and said that he had disposed of the body in the Guadalquivir, Carcaño claimed that he had told the police what they wanted to hear. He also denied any involvement from Delgado, who he claimed had left the apartment at 20:30, ten minutes after Carcaño arrived there with Del Castillo. Carcaño also denied having talked about the murder with P. G., in contradiction with her own testimony, which stated that he had told her "everything."

It was estimated that in the time between Del Castillo's disappearance and Carcaño's third confession, around 65,000 tons of trash had arrived at the landfill. As a result, it would be "very difficult" to locate her body. Landfill employees and policemen revised 60,000 tons over the course of thirty-two days unsuccessfully, even though they knew a particular area where the trash was dumped in the days following the murder. They also found no human DNA in the dumpsters that Carcaño had said were used to dispose of the body. Eventually, police concluded that Carcaño had not thrown the body in a dumpster and speculated that he had falsely confessed a rape with the intention of obtaining a bench trial rather than a trial by jury.

=== Provisional release of Delgado, Benítez and García ===
On May 21, Delgado was released with the condition that he visited the courthouse every Monday. Reasons included the fact that his part in the crime was necessarily small, if any, and that his alibi had been partly confirmed by mobile phone tracking placing him on the road to Carmona at 21:01. Delgado, who had always denied his involvement, offered to take a polygraph test, but the magistrate rejected the idea. After his release, Delgado made a press statement accusing Carcaño of lying to him, and about his involvement in the case. Benítez was released on December 10. He had requested to be released on two previous occasions, but he was denied arguing gravity of the suspected crime and a risk of tampering with evidence after release. García, being under eighteen years of age, was placed in a juvenile detention center for the maximum legal time (nine months) and moved to a supervised home afterward.

=== Evidence in vehicles owned by the family of García ===
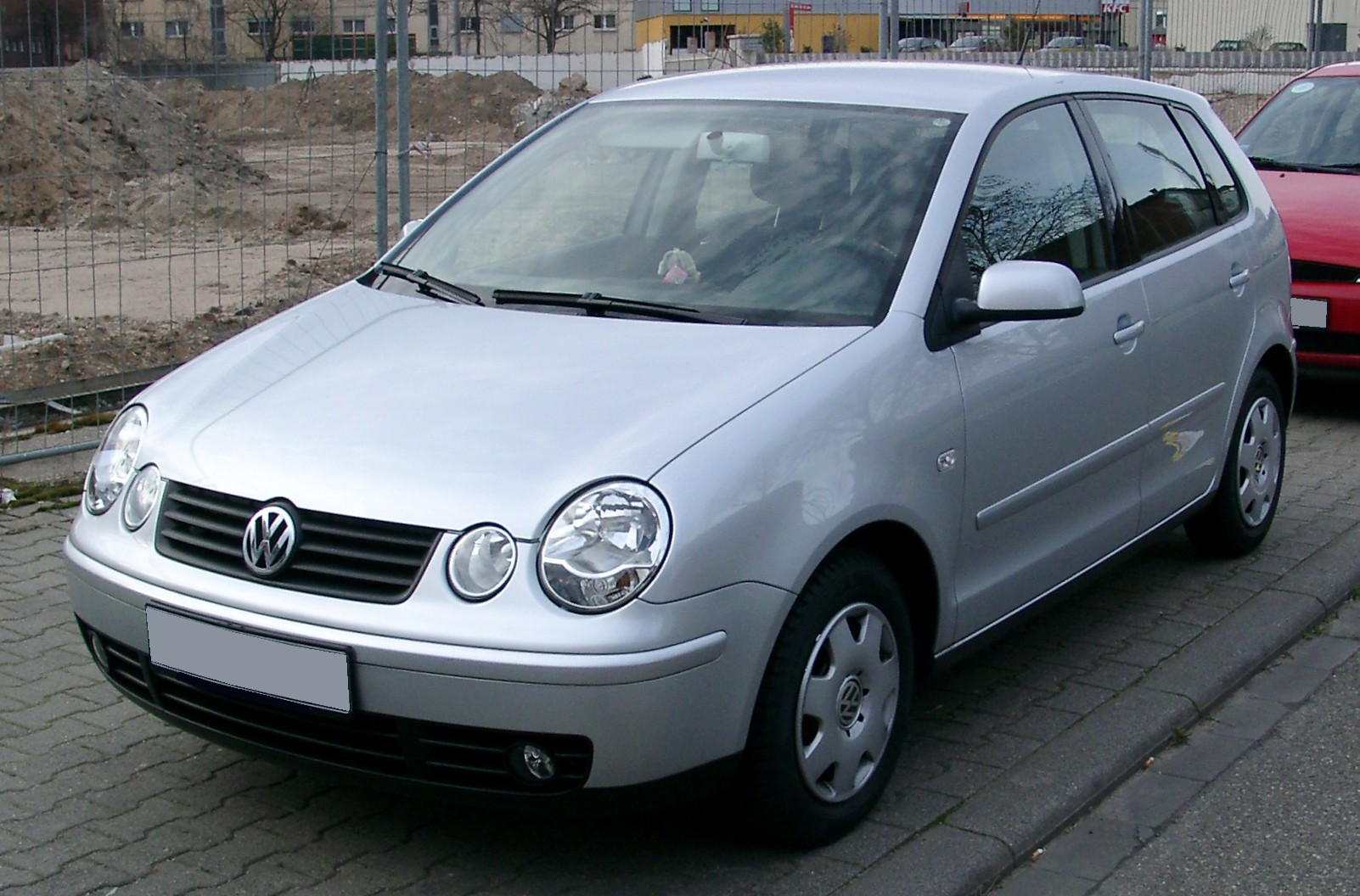
A Volkswagen Polo Mk4.

García first claimed that the trio used his mother's Volkswagen Polo to move the body from Carcaño's apartment to the Guadalquivir. This car was washed a few days after Del Castillo's disappearance but tested positive for blood in luminol and benzidine tests. However, no DNA could be extracted from the blood as it was too degraded. Police also found the DNA of a man and a woman in the car, which belonged to neither the victim nor the suspects; it was assumed to belong to García's mother and her boyfriend, but neither agreed to provide a DNA sample for comparison.

In December, it was discovered that a Renault 19 and a Ford Escort, both abandoned since August with flat tires and no license plates, had also belonged to García's mother and her boyfriend, contradicting their claims that they only owned the Volkswagen. The Renault was retired and destroyed on November 27, before the discovery was made, but the Ford could be retrieved for testing. DNA of a man and a woman that was neither Del Castillo nor any of the accused was found in the Ford. The female DNA belonged to the same woman as the DNA in the Volkswagen.

== Trials ==
=== Pre-trial hearing ===
A pretrial hearing in the case was held on March 13, 2010. P. G., who faced no charges, was declared for an hour and a half. She testified that Carcaño had told her that he had thrown Del Castillo's body in a wooded area near Camas. Previously, she had claimed that he had buried the body in a ditch some 600 meters from this new location, which led to two unsuccessful searches there earlier. She also testified that Carcaño had not been at her home on the night of the crime, as he had claimed, but that he had left his cellphone there, explaining why tracking data placed him in Camas when the disappearance occurred. When questioned about a threatening call that she had received during the investigation, P. G. denied that she had identified Delgado as the caller, stating that she had merely picked his voice among several anonymous recordings played to her by police. Journalists speculated that this clarification was a result of P. G. feeling intimidated after Delgado sued her for perjury in the week leading to the hearing. Nevertheless, P. G. cast doubt on her own reliability as a witness when she nonchalantly claimed to have lied to police and stated, "If I lie to Police, I [can] lie to anyone." P. G.'s mother and grandmother also testified in regard to their three-week cohabitation with Carcaño in the family home. At the end of her declaration, P. G. walked past Carcaño and suffered a panic attack.

Carcaño declined to make a new statement. The judge only questioned him once, in regard to the location of Del Castillo's body. Carcaño lowered his head and said, "I don't know." The last person to testify was the mother of García, who said that her son had no access to her car because she kept the only existing key.

=== Ordinary court trial ===
The first trial, presided by Judge Francisco de Asís Molina, began on April 12, 2010. Carcaño was charged with two instances of rape, one of murder, one of crimes against moral integrity and one of desecrating a corpse. Delgado, his girlfriend María García Mendaro and Benítez each faced a charge of concealment of a crime, corpse desecration and crimes against moral integrity, with Delgado receiving an additional charge for making threats.

The prosecution's version of the crime largely followed Carcaño's third version of the events, with the differing claim that Delgado and María visited the apartment after Benítez and were involved in the disposal of the body. It also mentioned García as one of the main perpetrators, who was to be tried separately in juvenile court.

The prosecution requested a sentence of fifty-two years in prison for Carcaño, eight for Delgado, and five for Benítez. It also requested all four adults to pay the expenses of the unsuccessful search for the body and to compensate Del Castillo's parents with 160,000 euro and each of her sisters with 30,000 euro. In addition, Benítez should stay away from Del Castillo's family and not contact them for six years after his incarceration.

On February 1, 2011, Carcaño testified before the court, stating this time that Del Castillo wasn't raped, he killed her alone with the ashtray and stayed in the apartment to clean up the crime scene while Benítez and García disposed of the body in the Guadalquivir. On October 18, he added that he had falsely accused García in vengeance for García implicating Delgado in the murder, testifying that Benítez and García did not arrive until after the murder had already happened.

Delgado claimed that he left the apartment without ever meeting Del Castillo or knowing that she was in a relationship with his half-brother; that Carcaño's bedroom door was closed when he left and that he didn't look inside; and that he was with his ex-wife and daughter between 21:00 and 23:30, in his pub until 2:00 and in a bar until 4:00, when he called García to let him into the apartment. He denied having threatened anyone or to know where Del Castillo's body was, but he refused to explain what he meant when he was heard saying, "There is nothing to look for" in the aftermath of her disappearance. María testified that she asked Delgado's permission to study in his apartment and that she went there after driving Delgado to his pub around 23:50. She claimed to have never seen Del Castillo or her body, but that she smelled something strange behind Carcaño's door, which was closed. María then retracted this last statement. She denied accusations that her testimony was intended to fabricate an alibi for Delgado. Benítez testified that he never was at the apartment and had no involvement in the crime, attributing his original confession to police pressure.

García, already convicted in his own trial, testified as a witness on the main trial on October 26. He claimed to not know where Del Castillo's body was and that his original confessions were falsely made after police threatened to implicate his mother and other relatives. On November 3, P. G. testified that Carcaño had told her how he and Delgado had murdered Del Castillo, cleaned the murder scene, disposed of the body with "two others" in the wooden area near Camas and entered her home through a window in the early morning. She explained inconsistencies in her previous versions with the claim that she had been threatened. P. G.'s mother testified that Carcaño had murdered Del Castillo but had no part in the body disposal, explaining her daughter's inconsistencies as due to being both afraid and in love with Carcaño. The early witness statement by P. G.'s grandmother, who had died before the trial started, was read again; it stated that she had washed Carcaño's clothes in the morning and found nothing strange on them.

Antonio T. D., a barman who worked near Carcaño's apartment, testified that he saw two thin individuals in hoodies pushing a wheelchair with a large package to the dumpsters, around 2:00, and then returning with the wheelchair empty. Delgado's ex-wife testified that he was with her and their daughter between 21:15 and 23:30.

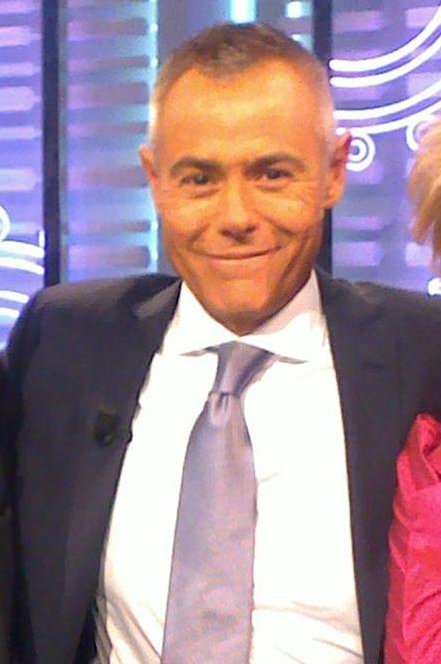
Jordi González, host of 'La Noria'.

On November 14, a taxi driver testified as a surprise witness for the prosecution, claiming he drove Delgado to the apartment "in the first hours of the morning", thus contradicting the testimonies of Delgado and María. When asked why he didn't come forward until the week before, he said that he didn't realize the value of his testimony before then. García's father testified that he sent his son home early and that while he did not check if he was there, as he was at work, his wife did. García's mother said that she arrived home at 1:30 and saw her son asleep in his room. Her testimony was polemic because she had repeatedly requested to delay or cancel her court appearance claiming illness, yet she had been interviewed the week before on Telecinco's prime-time talk show La Noria, which the network paid money for. In response, Telecinco was subjected to a viewer boycott and all of its sponsors pulled out of the show, leading to the relegation of the programme to an early morning timeslot before its eventual cancelation.

On January 16, 2012, Carcaño was sentenced to twenty years in prison and to compensate Del Castillo's parents and sisters with 340,000 euro for the murder; he was acquitted of every other charge. All other accused were acquitted of all charges due to lack of evidence. The sentence stated that Carcaño had disposed of the body with the help of García (convicted in his own trial) and a third, unknown person, but the evidence identifying that person as Benítez was deemed insufficient.

=== Juvenile court trial ===
García's trial began on January 24, 2011. The presiding judge was Alejandro Vián. García stood charges for rape, murder and a crime against moral integrity due to his prevention of Del Castillo's receiving a funeral; he argued his innocence and claimed to not know the location of the body, blaming his four previous confessions on police pressures. Carcaño, Delgado, Benítez and María were called to testify as witnesses, while García's father declined to testify. The prosecution requested six years of internment in a juvenile detention center, three under supervised freedom and a 616,319 euro fine, the cost of the unsuccessful search for Del Castillo's body.

On March 24, 2011, García was found guilty of the charge of concealment and was sentenced to three years in a juvenile detention center and one month of supervised freedom. The verdict allowed his past internment to be counted as part of his sentence, meaning that he would be released less than a year after the trial. García was found innocent of the charges of rape and murder, and not liable to pay for the expenses incurred during the unsuccessful search for the body. The verdict caused controversy because it relied on the identity of Carcaño as the main perpetrator, even though this wasn't proven yet since Carcaño's own trial had not finished.

=== Supreme Court ruling ===
Citing contradictions and "illogical" assumptions on the original ruling, the prosecution requested that Carcaño's sentence be overturned by the Supreme Court of Spain and a new trial take place. This was rejected by the Supreme Court and the verdicts were upheld, but his sentence was changed after considering that his ever-changing statements about the murder went beyond his right to not testify and incriminate himself. These had caused unnecessary additional grief to the relatives of Del Castillo and constituted a crime against moral integrity. As a result, Carcaño was given an additional one-year and three months in prison, and was also fined with the cost of the unsuccessful searches estimated on 616,319.27 euro.

== Aftermath ==
=== Continued searches ===
In 2013, Carcaño told police that Delgado was the real, and only, murderer of Del Castillo. According to this new version—Carcaño's sixth—Delgado pistol-whipped Del Castillo with his security guard's firearm after she tried to intervene in a fight between the half-brothers, and they subsequently buried the body together on a farm in La Rinconada called "La Majaloba", returning twenty-four hours later to cover the remains with lime. When asked why he had not said any of that earlier, Carcaño replied that he was afraid of Delgado. The prosecution considered the story unbelievable and journalists noted obvious parallels with the killing of Lasa and Zabala by the paramilitary group Grupos Antiterroristas de Liberación in 1983. Following Delgado's new interrogation, the judge cleared him and criticized police for questioning Carcaño for a crime he was already convicted of. Despite general scepticism, La Majaloba was searched months later and no trace of a body was found.

In 2014, search operations were made in an illegal dumpsite located near the road used by Carcaño to move between Seville and Camas, not far from the river shore where he claimed to have thrown Del Castillo's body in his first confession. The new location was deemed promising according to the results of a P300 study Carcaño was subjected to in hospital at Zaragoza. While human bone fragments were recovered at the site, they belonged to three or more people who had died between 100 and 200 years before. Carcaño reiterated his latest confession before the court, insisting that Del Castillo's body was in La Majaloba, not the dump, and saying that he didn't understand why police were searching there.

In 2015, Del Castillo's father offered Carcaño 18,000 euro if he pinpointed the exact location of the body, with the promise that he would not seek additional charges against him and that he could spend the money in Seville or wherever he wished after his incarceration. Carcaño rejected the offer, saying that it wouldn't "make up for him."

=== "Óscar"'s claims ===
On September 7, 2015, Antena 3's Espejo Público interviewed a man with the pseudonym "Óscar" who claimed to be a police consultant who had infiltrated García's social circle for the past two and a half years and had recorded 600 hours of conversations on tape. The interviewee claimed that when Carcaño and García transported Del Castillo's body on the wheelchair, they did not bring it to the dumpster or the river, as they had claimed, but to a second apartment where it was dismembered with the help of a non-Spanish friend of Carcaño. It was then taken out in different bags, whose fate was ignored by Carcaño, thus explaining his incapability to locate the body exactly. The same source claimed that García's family felt "no sadness nor empathy" for Del Castillo's family, that they laughed about the unsuccessful search for the body and that they had considered having someone beat up Del Castillo's mother and grandfather.

On October 29, the examining magistrate accepted the tapes as potential evidence. Some excerpts were broadcast on Espejo Público, revealing that García's mother had helped create an alibi for her son, that she was worried about the possibility that he had raped Del Castillo and that she thought García's father might compromise his son's case by talking too much. "Óscar" also said that García's mother "may have" helped in the disposal of the body by lending her vehicle, that García wanted to protect his mother and that he had proof of Delgado's involvement in the murder.

In January 2016, "Óscar" was publicly identified by police as Pablo Bonilla R., a common criminal and one of many people who had tried to infiltrate themselves into the high-profile case. It was denied that he ever worked for police in any capacity, and the tapes were dismissed as a hoax. These revelations were made during a trial against García's parents and Bonilla himself, the latter for breaking the restraining order that forbid García from setting foot within 50 kilometers of Seville. Bonilla, charged for driving the car used by García and his family to travel to Seville, claimed that he had alerted police about the family's intentions, and that police had told him to drive them into the road control where they were arrested. Bonilla's claims were dismissed and all three accused were sentenced to pay small fines.

On March 16, 2016, the Del Castillo family sued García and his parents for false testimony at the main trial, which happened when García was already of age and legally liable. As their evidence, they cited other witness testimonies, the dismissed tapes and television statements by the parents claiming that they lied to create an alibi for their son. García's family rejected the tapes both as a forgery and illegally taken, and refused to testify in the new trial.

=== 2017 Guadalquivir search ===
Judge Molina ordered a new search in a section of the Guadalquivir on February 7, 2017, after receiving a report commissioned by Del Castillo's father. The area, a ten-minute walk away from Carcaño's former apartment, was identified as the likely location of the body disposal by criminologist Ignacio Abad and geophysicist Luis Avial, who used a georadar to locate sixteen "exogen" points on the river bed susceptible of being the body. The area was consistent with the testimony of a nurse in the Virgen Macarena University Hospital, who claimed to have seen three men in black hoodies pushing a wheelchair. When they stopped, the "very little one" was approached by a couple who talked to him. The search ended on February 24 after only finding unrelated objects.

That same day, Del Castillo's father met Carcaño in Herrera de la Mancha prison. Carcaño claimed that he didn't know the location of her body and that it was Delgado who disposed of it. This time, he claimed that Delgado transported the body in his ex-wife's car and that he buried it in a farm of La Algaba. He added that Delgado had probably dug it up later and reburied it elsewhere. Carcaño also claimed that he was threatened by Delgado into accompanying him to dispose of the body, but that he barely collaborated and fled as soon as he could. As for his ever-changing versions of the murder, he claimed that he always followed the advice of his half-brother.

== Film adaptations ==
On November 5, 2021, a documentary series divided into three episodes was released on the Netflix platform, entitled ¿Dónde está Marta? (Where Is Marta?), directed by Paula Cons.

== See also ==
- List of solved missing person cases (2000s)
- Murder of Eva Blanco
- Murder of Rocío Wanninkhof
- Murder of Rosana Maroto
- Ramón Laso
