= Manual del Baratero =

19th-century Spanish knife fighting book

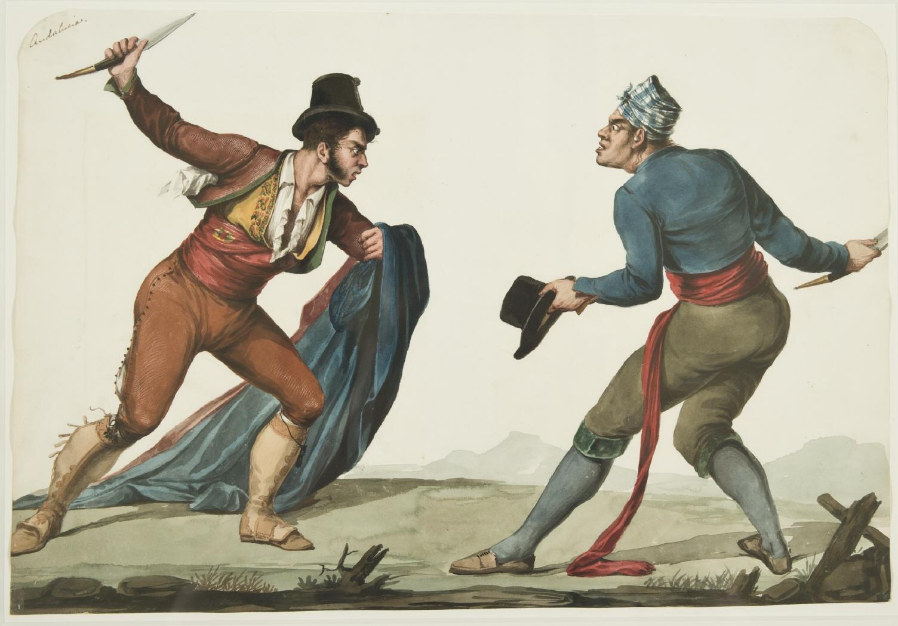
Riña de bandoleros. Antonio María Esquivela. c 1830.

El Manual del Baratero, o arte de manejar la navaja, el cuchillo y la tijera de los jitanos (Manual of the Baratero, or the art of wielding the jackknife, the knife and the gypsy scissors) is a Spanish treatise of knife fighting published in 1849. It was written by an anonymous author referred to as M.d.R., identified in modern times with Spanish scholar and writer Mariano de Rementeria y Fica.

It is notorious in the historical European martial arts for addressing in a unique way the Andalusian tradition of short bladed weapons, being possibly the oldest conserved European treatise solely dedicated to knife fighting. Its name references the baratero, a figure from the criminal underworld of 19th century Spain. The contents of the manual exist within a martial tradition with branches in all of Ibero-America and Italy.

== Background ==
A baratero was a small time criminal which employed intimidation, usually through his dexterity with the knife, to collect the barato, a percentage of the revenue of street card players, whom he would protect from rival thugs in exchange. The players would play solely with a deck owned by their baratero as a physical sign of their deal. This exchange happened in streets, markets, fair and prisons, and any of these could feature fights between barateros for a territory. They were usually of Iberian ethnicity, but there were also Afro-Spaniards, often hailing from Cuba and other overseas territories of the late Spanish Empire. A notorious example of a black baratero was the character Meri from Manuel Martínez Barrionuevo's novel El tóbalo, baratero.

The author signed the book as "M.d.R.", but he has been identified with Mariano de Rementeria y Fica (1786-1841), an author of instructionals of many other fields of his age. Rementeria, of Basque extraction and working as a professor in the Escuela Normal of Madrid, probably had little to no personal experience with knife fighting. However, much of the knowledge and jargon reflected in the book is real, leading historians to the belief that Rementeria wrote it with the assistance of actual barateros. This was the only of his manuals he did not sign under his full name, probably not wanting to have his name publicly associated with criminal enterprises.

== Contents ==
The Manual focuses in the usage of the famed navaja or Spanish jackknife, but also includes the dagger, wielded the same way, and the shearing scissors, which were commonly used as a weapon by Gitanos due to their usual jobs in cattle raising. These scissors were used to stab while closed and opened them while still lodged in the opponent's body, causing lethal wounds upon retracting them.

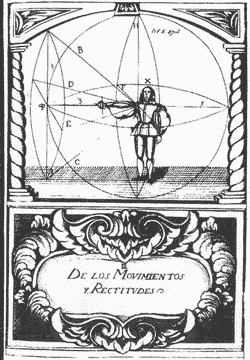
Diagram of Verdadera Destreza.

According to martial artist James Loriega, the first English translator of the Manual, the book contains only basic knowledge and superficial descriptions, as it was probably a instructional for those who lacked any experiencie with the blade. Some of the tricks featured, in turn, are singularly impractical and unrepresentative of the usually pragmatic Spanish styles, requiring much skill and comparable confidence to use. However, Loriega considers the book highly relevant as a starting point and interesting for its positions, principles and strategies, which make it a fighting system in itself.

There is evidence that the book's contents come from a single school within a variety of national styles, which included not only Andalusians but also Basques, Catalans, Toledans and others. 19th century writer Théophile Gautier, who was versed in savate and canne de combat, claimed there were as many knife masters in Spain as fencing masters in France, with regional styles different enough to recognize each other.

The fighting system depicted in the Manual seems to be inspired by the Spanish fencing school of Verdadera Destreza, taking in particular its constant control of distance and its circular footwork theory, a distinctive trait that allowed it to outflank practitioners from the more linear Italian and French schools. One of the book's tricks, however, is copied verbatim (with a typo, mistaking left for right) from the fencing teatise Principios de Destreza del Espadín, published in 1805 by Manuel Antonio de Brea.

According to Ramón Martínez, a Puerto Rican-American expert in navaja and Destreza, the manual's techniques are highly similar to those found in Puerto Rican culture, where the jackknife receives the name of navaja sevillana. These similarities trace to a tradition of Hispanic knife fighting nicknamed Legado Andaluz ("Andalusian legacy") which influences not only the martial traditions of Hispanic America, but also those of the Philippines and Brazil. The manual features a technique untying the sash and using its end to trip any opponent who steps on it, which is also typical of Mexican and Argentinean knife fighting, where the poncho is used instead.

Much of the Manual's contents also resemble the southern Italian schools of sword and dagger, especially the Manfredonian and Sicilian schools. The attacks named jiro and contrajiro ("twist" and "countertwist"), involving pivoting steps to stab at the opponent from the sides, clearly resemble the Italian technique of giro or colpo al mancino. The cambio de mano, a trick in which the weapon is hidden behind the back and secretly passed from one hand to the other to change stances, exists also in Italian styles under the name of passamano. The book also uses the terms planta or pianta, typical of the Manfredonian school. Those influences might come from a common origin through the Italian Romani communities.

== Bibliography ==
- Goldberg, K. Meira (2022). Sonidos negros: sobre la Negritud del flamenco. Libargo. ISBN 9788494813696.
- Jaquet, Daniel (2016). Late Medieval and Early Modern Fight Books: Transmission and Tradition of Martial Arts in Europe (14th-17th Centuries). Brill. ISBN 9789004324725.
- Laura, Roberto (2015). Das Schwert des Volkes: Geschichte, Kultur und Methodik des traditionellen, italienischen Messerkampfes. Tredition. ISBN 978-3732352333.
- Loriega, James (2005). Manual of the Baratero (translated by James Loriega). Paladin Press. ISBN 978-1581604719.
- Loriega, James (1999). Sevillian Steel: The Traditional Knife-fighting Arts of Spain. Paladin Press. ISBN 978-1581600391.
- Manual del Baratero. Maxtor. 2015. ISBN 978-8490014936.
- Martínez Martínez, Manuel (2007). Los forzados de Marina en el siglo XVIII. El caso de los gitanos (1700-1765). Publisher Universidad de Almería. ISBN 9788482408521.
- Turrado Vidal, Martín (2010). De Hipatia al Padre Claret. De Al-Qaeda al mapa policial español. Visión. ISBN 9788499836959.
