= Corvo (knife) =

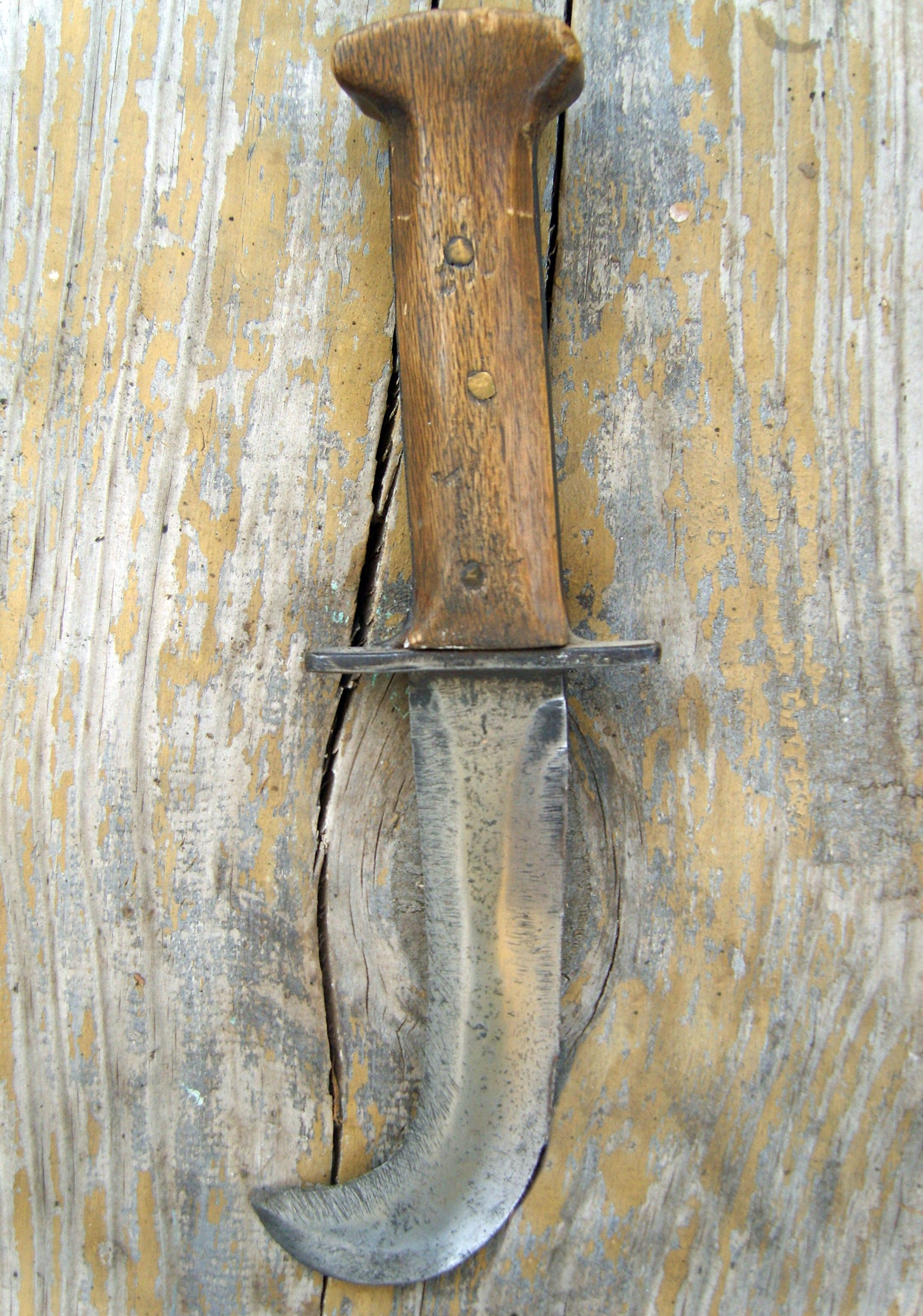
- Type: Dagger
- Place of origin: Chile

Service history
- Wars: Chilean War of Independence, War of the Pacific

Production history
- Variants: Corvo Comando or Pico de Cóndor (Condor's Beak); Corvo atacameño

Specifications
- Length: 29 or 30 cm (11 or 12 in)
- Blade length: 16 to 19 cm (6.3 to 7.5 in)
- Blade type: Dagger
- Hilt type: Metal, hard leather or polymers
- Scabbard/sheath: Metal, hard leather or polymers
- Head type: Metal
- Haft type: Wood, checkered plastics

The Corvo is a double-edged, curved bladed weapon typically used in Chile.

== History ==
There is no defined origin of the Corvo, but the tool is considered as the national knife of Chile, like the Navaja in Spain and Bowie knife in the United States.

== Design ==
Corvos are approximately 12 in (300 mm) and may be used as combat knives.

When fighting with a corvo, the wielder will not feint with the blade itself; traditionally it is used in conjunction with a rag, poncho or stick in the off-hand, which allows the bearer to parry an incoming attack.

The corvo is then used to counterattack with a swiping, slashing or stabbing motion.

== Variants ==
There are a few different models of corvo, the modern versions are:

=== Corvo Comando ===
Also known as the "Condor's Beak" (Spanish: Pico de Condor), the Corvo Commandos has a blade with a nearly 90 degree bend that spans a third of its portion.

=== Corvo Atacameño ===
Also known as the "Cougar's Claw" (Spanish: Garra de Puma), the Corvo Atacameño has a very slight curve to the blade (equal to approximately 45°) but is normally longer than the Commando variant.

== Usage ==
Initially a tool similar to a grappling hook, Corvos were widely used in combat during the Chilean War of Independence and the War of the Pacific, which for the latter, particularly during the Battle of Arica.

It was not standard issue, but rather a personal weapon or tool that the soldiers brought with them from home.

Due to its popularity, the Chilean Army refined the Corvo and added it to their arsenal in 1963.

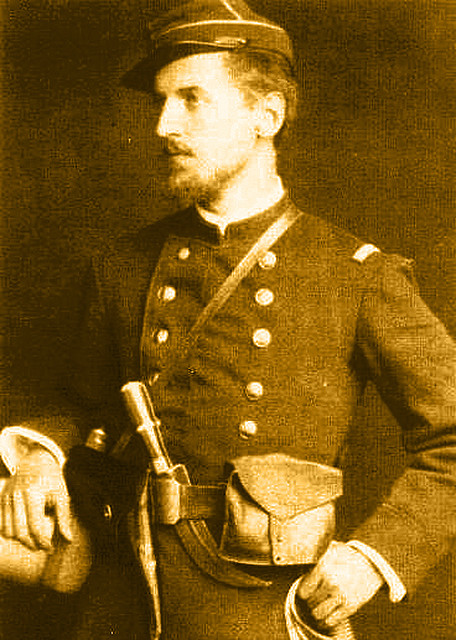
Second Lieutenant José Luis Herrera Gandarillas with a Corvo in his belt (Antofagasta, 20 February 1879).

In 1974, in preparation for a war against Argentina, Army officials consulted Corvo users in prison for developing a combat system using the weapon.

During the military dictatorship under Augusto Pinochet, Corvos were commonly used to torture political prisoners before being executed, especially during the Caravan of Death era.

The FAMAE started producIng modernised Corvos in 1978, which the Chilean Army brought it to the border with Argentina for the first time.

Today, it is the national and traditional symbol of Chilean commandos and it's used in military training, both in the infantry and special forces.

== Anecdote ==
Per local legend, but now widely debunked by historians, Chilean soldiers would consume chupilca del diablo in order to drive themselves into a frenzy prior to close-combat, attacking the enemy with their corvos.

== Users ==
- Chile

== See also ==
- Fairbairn–Sykes fighting knife
- Cuchillo De Paracaidista
- Tantō
- Navaja
- Facón
- Karambit
