= Where Is Marta? =

- ¿Dónde está Marta?
- Genre: True crime Documentary
- Country of origin: Spain
- Original language: Spanish
- No. of seasons: 1
- No. of episodes: 3

Production
- Running time: 58–70 minutes

Original release
- Release: November 5, 2021

Where is Marta? (Spanish: ¿Dónde está Marta?) is a 2021 Spanish true crime documentary miniseries about the murder of Marta del Castillo.

== Episodes ==
No.	Title	Directed by	Original release date
1	"No Signal"	Paula Cons	November 5, 2021
Marta's family and friends describe the night she went missing and the subsequent search that ensued as they grew suspicious with her ex, Miguel.
2	"Network of Deception"	Paula Cons	November 5, 2021
The search for Marta's body continues as Miguel and other suspects change their versions of what happened in the night she was killed.
3	"No further questions, your Honor"	Paula Cons	November 5, 2021
The suspects stand trial for Marta's murder and the ensuing coverup. Her parents explained the desired to find her body. Plus, new evidence is analyzed.
