= Facón =

South American gaucho knife

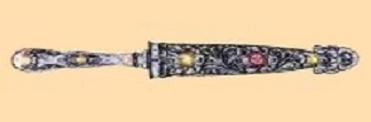
Facón in an elaborate sheath

A facón is a fighting and utility knife widely used in Argentina, Brazil, and Uruguay as the principal tool and weapon of the gaucho of the South American pampas.

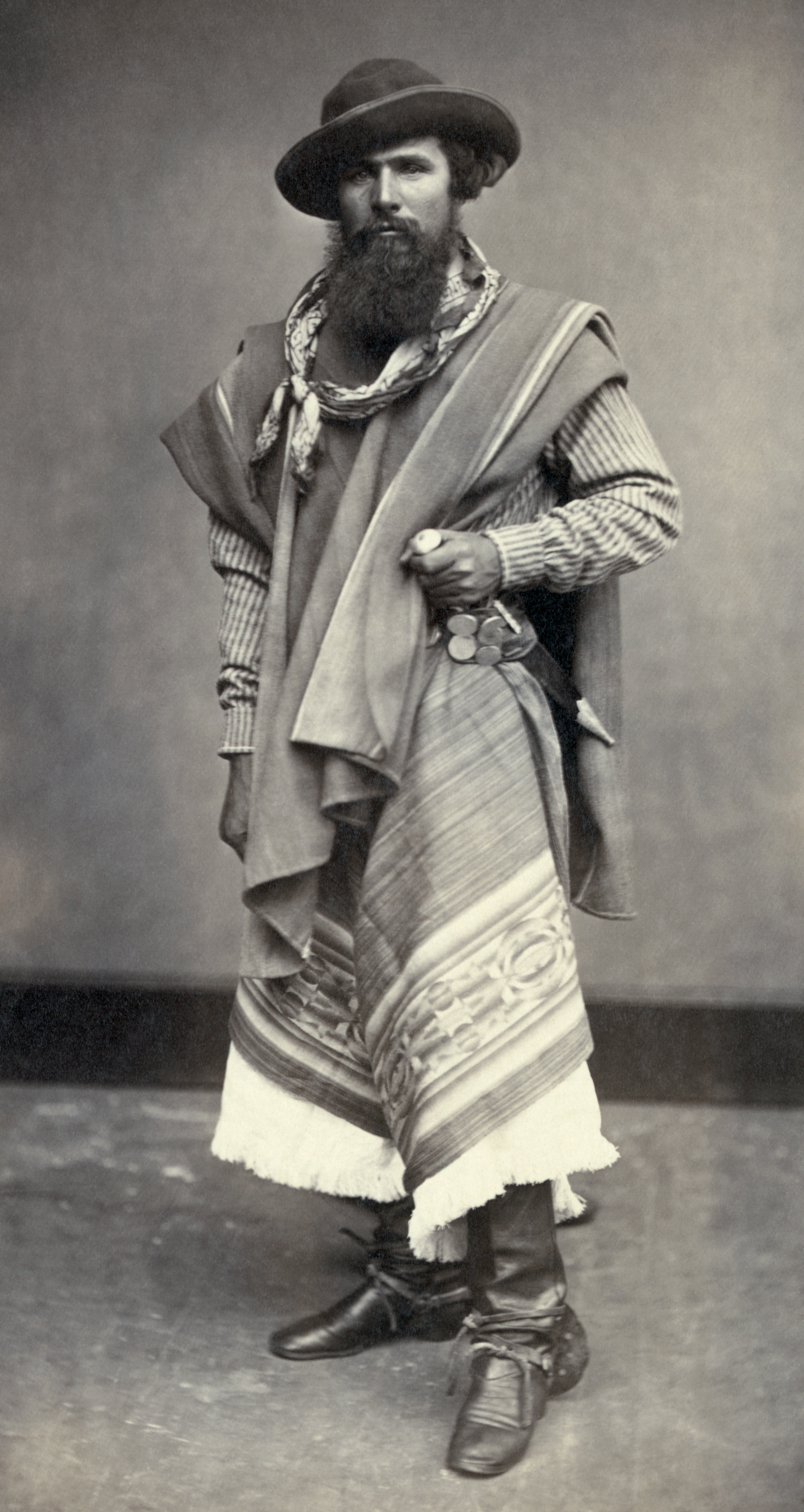
A gaucho with his facón

== History ==
The facón is a derivation of the Portuguese facão, a large-bladed fighting and utility knife that accompanied Portuguese explorers and émigrés during their settlement and exploration of Brazil.

Deprived of their ability to wear a sword by various edicts, Spanish caballeros in South America adopted the facón, particularly in the nations of Uruguay, Brazil and Argentina as a convenient weapon of self-defense.

In an 1828 account of the capture of Las Damas Argentinas, a pirate schooner carrying a mixed group of Spanish-speaking pirates, the carrying of knives very similar to the facón is mentioned:

Amongst these [weapons], were a large number of long knives - weapons which the Spaniards use very dexterously. They are about the size of a common English carving knife, but for several inches up the blade cut both sides.

As a result of its bloody history, the facón and similar knives were frequently outlawed over the years in Uruguay, Argentina, and Brazil, though without much outward effect.

== Design ==
Often fitted with an elaborately decorated metal hilt and sheath, the facón has a large, heavy blade measuring from 25 cm (10 in.) to 51 cm (20 in.) in length.

An 1830 article on the facón carried by the gaucho of that era describes it as a "carving knife" with a blade fourteen inches in length; it was carried in a leather sheath worn either in a waist sash or tucked into leggings.

Most examples of the facón have crude decorations and are poorly fitted.

Some examples were converted from cut-down swords, while others used blades imported from as far away as England.

== Usage ==
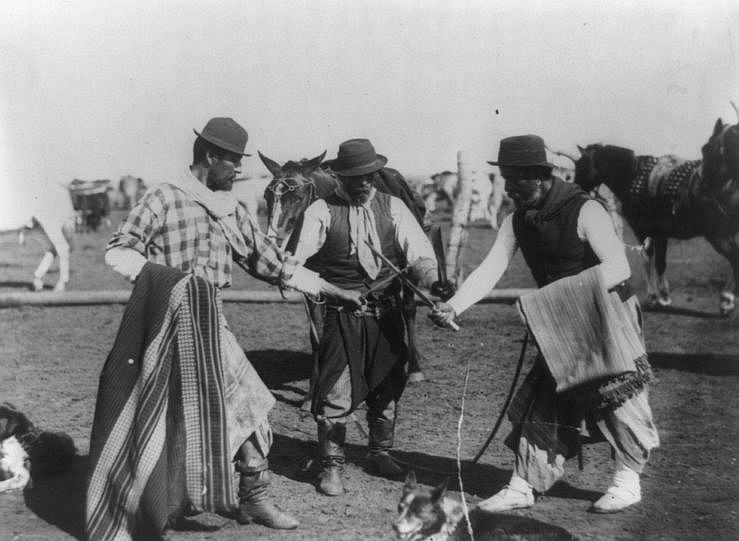
Gauchos demonstrate use of facones

The facón is both a fighting knife and a utility knife universally adopted by the gaucho in Argentina and Uruguay in countless lethal knife fights and murders.

The knife is typically worn at the back and tucked into the gaucho's belt to allow it to be quickly drawn with the right hand.

As a fighting knife, the facón is the main article of combat in an indigenous style of knife fighting known as esgrima criolla ("Creole fencing")

When used in this context, one hand holds the knife, and a poncho or coat is wrapped about the opposite arm to absorb cuts and stabs in a manner reminiscent of traditional Andalusian knife fighting styles using the long-bladed Spanish clasp knife or navaja sevillana.

As Charles Darwin said of the distinctive men who wore and used the facón, "Many quarrels arose, which from the general manner of fighting with the knife often proved fatal."

After the turn of the 19th century, when repeating handguns became more widely available, use of the facón as a close combat weapon declined.

Among the gauchos, many continued to wear the knife, though mostly for use as a meat carving or utility knife. However, it was occasionally still used to settle arguments "of honor".

In these situations two adversaries would attack with slashing attacks to the face, stopping the fight when one of the participants could no longer see clearly as the result of blood seeping from one or more facial cuts.

== See also ==
- List of daggers
- Navaja
- Corvo
- Knife fighting
