= Gustavo Romero Tercero =

Spanish murderer and rapist

- Born: Gustavo Romero Tercero; 16 December 1971 (age 54); Valdepeñas, Spain
- Other name: The Valdepeñas Killer
- Penalty: 103 years in prison

Details
- Victims: 3
- Span of crimes: 1993–1998
- Country: Spain
- State: Ciudad Real
- Date apprehended: 9 October 2003

Gustavo Romero Tercero (born 16 December 1971), also known as "The Valdepeñas Killer," is an incarcerated Spanish murderer and rapist.

== Early life ==
Gustavo Romero married young in Valdepeñas, to Yolanda Saez, and they had two children. Saez was pregnant with the second child at the time of the first murders in 1993. Romero had a long history of sexual obsession, voyeurism and domestic violence against his wife and children. Nevertheless, he was not considered a threat by those outside his home. One of his favourite voyeurism spots was Valdepeñas's public park, where he spied on couples kissing with little regard for being seen by them.

== The 'Crime of the Sweethearts' ==
On 18 June 1993, Romero ambushed Ángel Ibáñez (24) and his girlfriend Sara Dotor (20) as they left the park and ordered them to go to an uninhabited, dark area next to a railway. He was armed with a double-bladed navaja and he pointed it to Ibáñez's throat. Once there, Romero demanded the couple's money and Ibáñez handed him his wallet. When Dotor said that she recognized Romero (he was the nephew of her brother's employer), Romero stabbed Ibáñez multiple times in his left arm and thorax. He continued doing so after Ibáñez was already dead. Dotor ran away, following the railway's fence in the direction of Valdepeñas's train station. After 85 metres, Romero caught up with her and delivered a single stab to the back of her neck that paralyzed her. He turned her over, molested her, inserted his fist in her vagina, and eventually beat and stabbed her in the thorax until she died. Romero took some of Dotor's clothes and threw them in the Jabalón river, then disposed of the blade in an orchard's waterwheel some 100 meters from his residence. Saez testified later that Romero came back home at 1:25 AM and that, in the following days, he got rid of the clothes he was wearing that night and of two knives he used to carry. She suspected him from the beginning but did not report him to authorities. Five days later, Romero left Valdepeñas for Las Palmas de Gran Canaria.

== Murder of Rosana Maroto ==
Romero returned to Valdepeñas in 1997. He became friends with Dotor's brothers and would often ask how the investigation of their sister's murder was going. Over the following year, Romero worked putting up plasterboard, at a meat packing factory, and as a cook in a roadside brothel. Around 16:30 on 25 June 1998, Romero finished his shift at the brothel and left in his car. He drove on unpaved country roads only because he did not own a driver's license. While driving on a road called "La Membrilla" (not to be confused with the town of the same name), he happened upon 21-year-old Rosana Maroto, who was cycling from her home in Valdepeñas to her father's country home, seven kilometres away. Maroto studied Art History in Ciudad Real and had returned to Valdepeñas only two days before, following the end of the school year. She had no relationship with Romero.

According to Romero, he hit Maroto by accident, exited the car, and tried to resuscitate her without success. He believed that she was dead, and fearing that this would out him as the murderer of Ibáñez and Dotor, he resolved to put Maroto in the car's trunk and the bicycle in the backseat, and throw both in different water wells in the country. After disposing of the bicycle, he drove to an abandoned farmstead and began to undress Maroto. She then regained consciousness, asked what had happened and demanded to have her bicycle back. Again according to Romero, a discussion ensued and he ended up strangling her with her shoelaces and throwing the body into an empty well that he covered with large stones. Though Maroto's body was largely skeletonized when it was recovered in 2003, Romero's DNA was found on it, which led to Romero being charged with rape and the prosecution stating that he had run Maroto over deliberately with the intention of raping her. Romero denied the charge, but he later testified that Maroto had agreed to practice fellatio and other sexual acts voluntarily in the farmstead. The Court did not believe this allegation.

Maroto's disappearance gained notoriety in Spain when her backpack was found three days later in the area where she disappeared. It contained her running shoes, walkman and a cap smeared with her vomit. Police also found blood with male DNA in the backpack, which was kept from the public. Maroto's family met Prime Minister Aznar and the Ministry of the Interior offered 25 million pesetas for clues leading to the arrest of the murderer. In 2000, Maroto's bicycle was found in a well 300 meters from the place where the backpack was found. By 2003, Police had searched 300 of over 1000 wells located around Valdepeñas, but the one with the body (four kilometres away from the abduction site) was not among them.

== Arrest and sentence ==
Saez reported Romero to the authorities in 2003, after he assaulted her and told her afterwards that he didn't care about the consequences because he had already killed several people. While being held in Herrera de la Mancha prison for domestic violence, Romero was informed that two witness testimonies and a DNA match tied him to the 1993 murders and the 1998 disappearance, respectively. Romero immediately collapsed and admitted to all three murders. Following his testimony, the Police's Special Operations Group retrieved the 1993 murder weapon and Maroto's body from their respective locations.

On 22 April 2005, Romero was sentenced to over 103 years in prison: 30 years in maximum prison for each murder, with the aggravating circumstances of premeditation and extreme cruelty; 12 for one rape, and 4 years, 2 months and 1 day in minimum prison for robbery. He was acquitted of the charge for Dotor's rape and another charge for Maroto's abduction. In addition, Romero was banned from Valdepeñas for 10 years after his incarceration, could not contact the victims' families for 5 years, and was forced to compensate them with 900,000 euro total.

== Other possible murders ==
Police explored the possibility that Romero had attacked other women in Ciudad Real and the Canary Islands during the time he had resided there. Special interest was given to the murders of 15-year-old Inmaculada Arteaga in Campo de Criptana in 2001 and 31-year-old Juani Díaz-Flores in Herencia on Valentine's Day, 2003. Both murders were attributed later to different criminals.

== See also ==
- Murder of Eva Blanco
- Joaquín Ferrándiz Ventura
- List of serial killers by country
