= Knife fight =

Violent physical confrontation involving knives

Unidentified group of men training knife fight
- November, 2021. Moscow, Russia
- Hidden camera shooting (32 sec.) on YouTube

A knife fight is a violent physical confrontation between two or more combatants in which one or more participants are armed with a knife. A knife fight is defined by the presence of a knife as a weapon and the violent intent of the combatants to kill or incapacitate each other; the participants may be completely untrained, self-taught, or trained in one or more formal or informal systems of knife fighting. Knife fights may involve the use of any type of knife, though certain knives, termed fighting knives, are purposely designed for such confrontations – the dagger being just one example.

== History ==
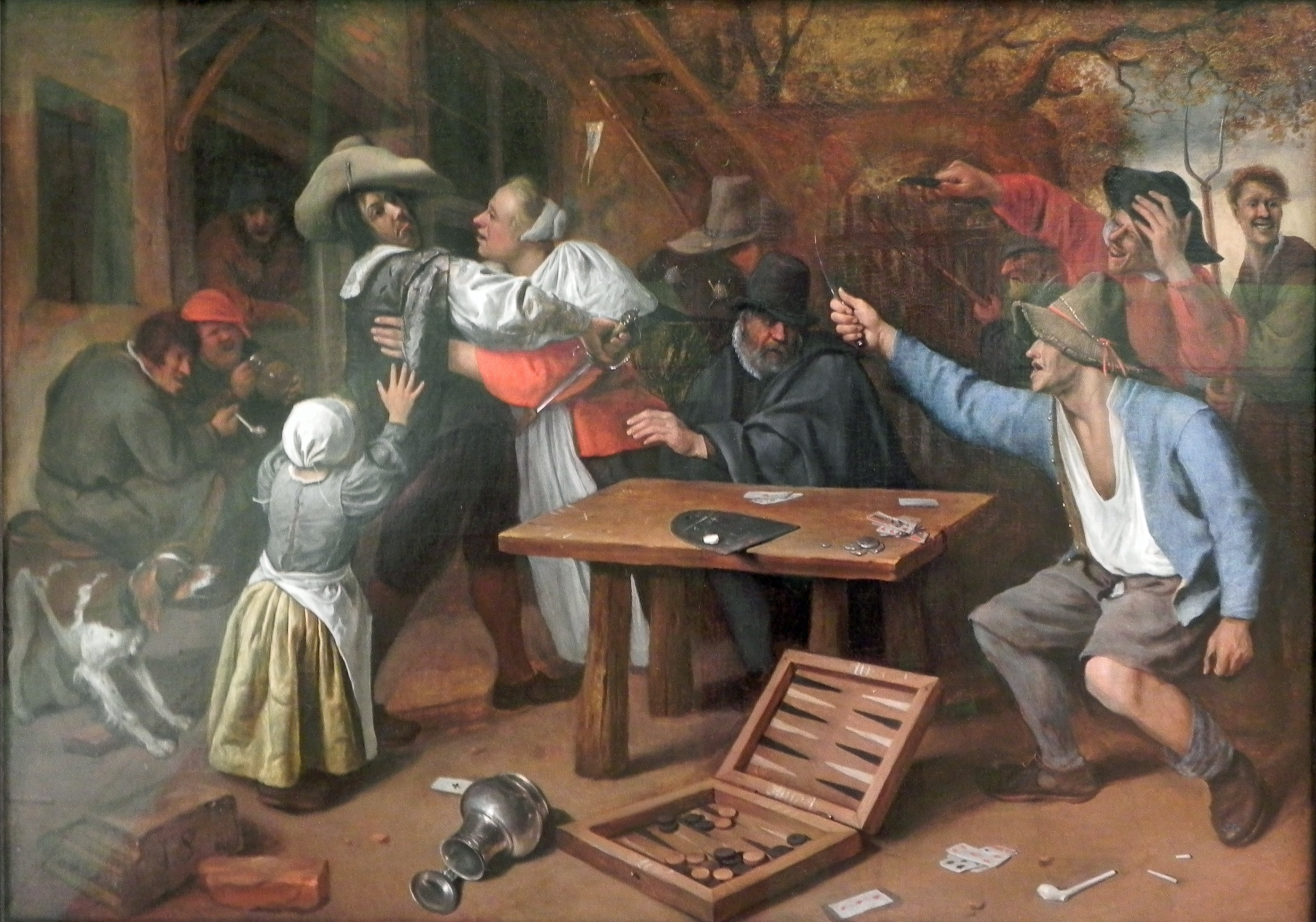
Argument over a Card Game, by Jan Steen, 17th century

=== Traditional schools ===
During the long history of the knife as a weapon, many systems or schools of knife fighting have developed around the world. Each is usually distinguished by region and culture of their origin. In past centuries the repeated invasion and conquest of foreign territories by invading armies frequently resulted in the dissemination and adoption of knives and knife fighting techniques. These were in turn adapted and improved upon through long practice and drills, sometimes over hundreds of years.

==== Scherma di stiletto siciliano ====
The Italian stiletto, originally a purely offensive weapon used to kill an unsuspecting or wounded adversary, was later embraced throughout Italy as a fighting knife for close combat confrontations. The popularity of the stiletto in the Kingdom of Sicily resulted in the development of the scherma di stiletto siciliano (Sicilian school of stiletto fighting). The stiletto was purely a thrusting or stabbing weapon, and the scherma di stiletto siciliano accordingly taught fighting movements designed to avoid the tip of the opponent's blade (scanso). Techniques characteristic of the scherma di stiletto siciliano include sbasso (bending to ground), in quarto tagliata (tacking to left or right), and the balzo (leap to evade the enemy's blade). A person skilled in the use of a stiletto would thrust the knife deep into the victim, then twist the blade sharply in various directions before retracting it, causing the sharp point to inflict severe internal damage not readily apparent when examining the entrance wound.

==== Andalucia ====
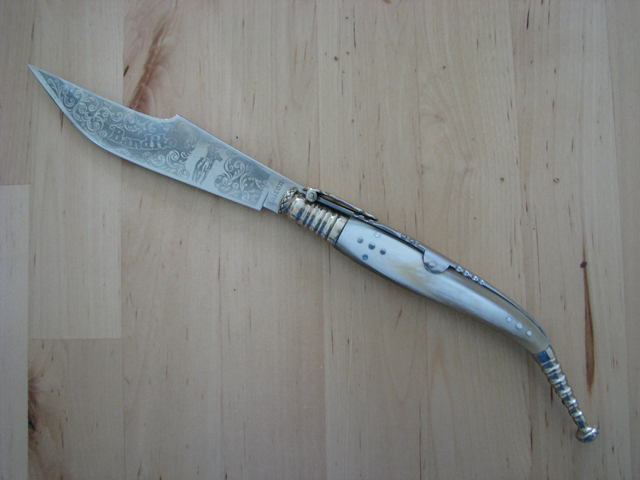
A navaja of traditional design, with a 5.5-inch (140 mm) blade

In Andalusian Spain, the use of the large navaja (folding knife) as a fighting knife has been commonly used by the peoples of that region since the 17th century. In that part of Spain, sword and knife fighting techniques (espada y daga) were regularly taught to young men as a necessary skill, often passed down from father to son as a rite of passage to adulthood (and in some cases, to daughters as well). In 18th- and 19th-century Spain esgrimas de navaja (fencing, or knife-fighting schools) could be found in the major cities and throughout Andalucía, particularly in Córdoba, Málaga, and Seville. As time went on, these schools began to depart from teaching traditional sword-fighting and fencing techniques in favour of simplified attacks and defences based largely on the concept of deception, distraction, and counterstrike.

Among navaja aficionados, the gamblers or barateros of Málaga and Seville were cited as the most skilled practitioners of fighting with the navaja. The firmly-established knife-fighting tradition with the navaja in Andalusian Spain, especially as reflected in the 19th century treatise Manual del Baratero, would later spread to other Spanish-speaking countries, and was known as el legado Andaluz, or "the Andalusian legacy".

==== Esgrima Criolla ====
The Esgrima Criolla ("Creole fencing") method of knife fighting was popularized by the South American gaucho and his large-bladed facón. Deprived of their ability to wear a sword by various edicts, Spanish gentlemen in South America adopted the facón, together with fighting techniques developed directly from el legado Andaluz, including the use of an item of clothing such as a poncho or cloak to protect the weaponless arm. The facón was later universally adopted by the gaucho of Argentina, Brazil and Uruguay, and later by men of the rural working class of those countries.

Knives similar in style and length to the facón were carried by a wide variety of South American men who were either prohibited from carrying swords or who needed a more convenient, wearable close combat weapon. In an 1828 account of the capture of Las Damas Argentinas, a pirate schooner carrying a mixed group of Spanish-speaking pirates, the carrying of knives very similar to the facón is mentioned:

"Amongst these [weapons], were a large number of long knives – weapons which the Spaniards use very dexterously. They are about the size of a common English carving knife, but for several inches up the blade cut both sides."

After the turn of the 19th century, the facón became more of a utility and ceremonial weapon, though it was still used to settle arguments "of honor". In these situations two adversaries would attack with slashing attacks to the face, stopping the fight when one of the participants could no longer see due to bleeding from shallow cuts.

==== Arnis ====
Arnis, also referred to as Eskrima and Kali, is an indigenous Philippine martial art involving the use of sticks, knives and other bladed weapons. Like most other knife fighting traditions, Eskrima is learned by constant practice, using sparring encounters between two or more opponents in order to hone a practitioner's physical skills and mental concentration. This martial art flourished for hundreds of years as part of a society with a blade culture, and the system's already impressive indigenous techniques were later directly influenced by Spanish and Andalusian fencing and knife fighting systems with the introduction of the angles of attack and the use of espada y daga (the word eskrima is a Filipinization of the Spanish word esgrima, meaning a fighting or fencing school).

=== Modern techniques ===
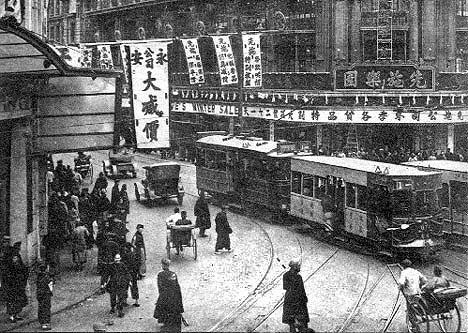
British section of the International Settlement in Shanghai, during the 1920s

Modern tactics for knife combat were developed by two British members of the Shanghai Municipal Police of the International Settlement in the 1920s. At the time, the Shanghai streets were rife with criminal activity, exacerbated by the political tensions of the time and the breakdown of social order in much of the country.

Captain William E. Fairbairn and Sergeant Eric A. Sykes developed knife fighting skills and defenses, which they began teaching to both police recruits and members of the British Army, Royal Marines and U.S. Marine units then stationed in Shanghai. Fairbairn reportedly engaged in hundreds of street fights in his twenty-year career in Shanghai, where he organized and headed a special anti-riot squad. Much of his body—arms, legs, torso, and even the palms of his hands—was covered with scars from those fights.

During World War II, Fairbairn and Sykes continued to refine their knife fighting techniques for military and paramilitary forces, teaching British Commandos, Special Operations Executive (SOE) personnel, selected American and foreign soldiers and covert espionage personnel, including members of the American Office of Strategic Services (OSS) and US/UK combined Operation Jedburgh teams. Their experience in training both soldiers and civilians in quick-kill knife fighting techniques eventually led to the development of a specialized fighting dagger suited for both covert elimination of enemy sentinels and close-combat knife fighting, the Fairbairn–Sykes fighting knife, a landmark weapon of its type.

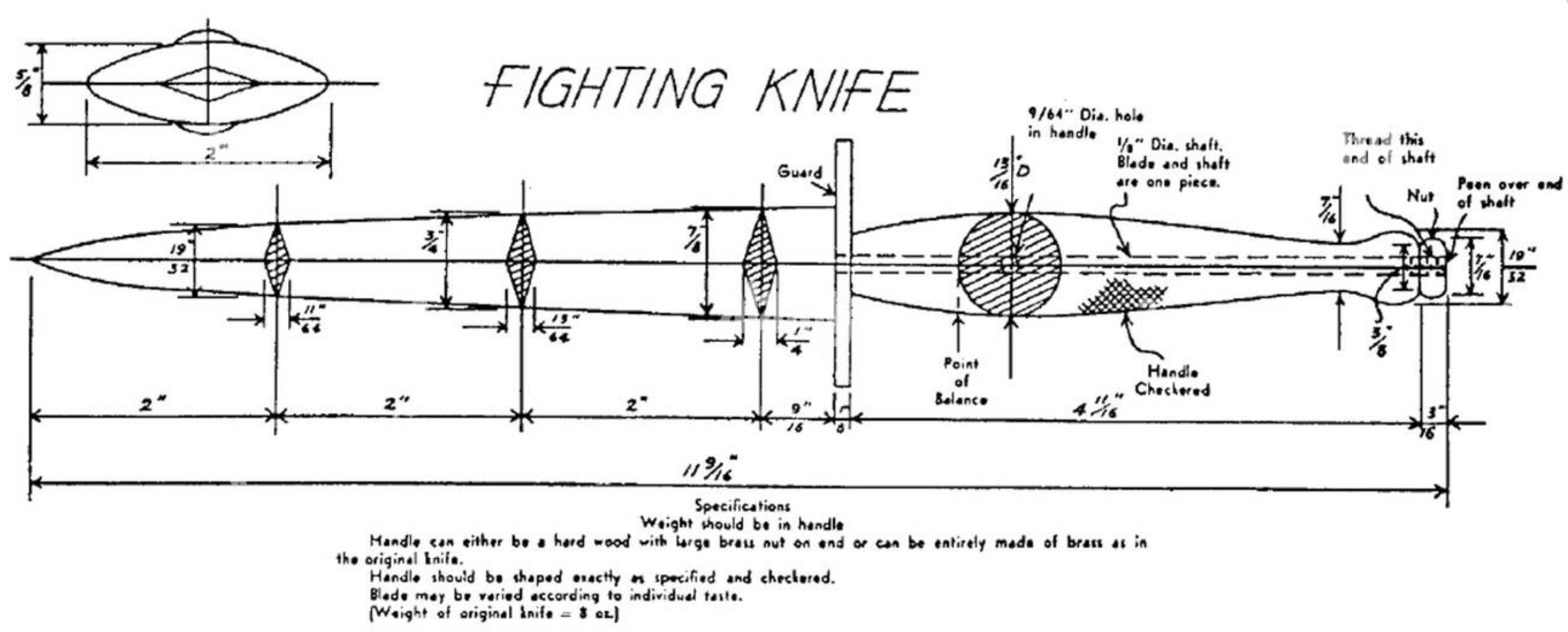
Fairbairn–Sykes fighting knife diagram from Kill or Get Killed, by Rex Applegate

The knife was designed exclusively for surprise attack and fighting, with a slender blade that can easily penetrate a ribcage. The vase handle grants precise grip, and the blade's design is especially suited to its use as a fighting knife. Fairbairn's rationale is in his book Get Tough! (1942):

In close-quarters fighting there is no more deadly weapon than the knife. In choosing a knife there are two important factors to bear in mind: balance and keenness. The hilt should fit easily in your hand, and the blade should not be so heavy that it tends to drag the hilt from your fingers in a loose grip. It is essential that the blade have a sharp stabbing point and good cutting edges, because an artery torn through (as against a clean cut) tends to contract and stop the bleeding. If a main artery is cleanly severed, the wounded man will quickly lose consciousness and die.

The length of the blade was chosen to give several inches of blade to penetrate the body after passing through the 3 in (7.6 cm) of the thickest clothing that was anticipated to be worn in the war, namely that of Soviet greatcoats. Later production runs of the F–S fighting knife have a blade length that is about 7.5 in (19 cm).

In all cases, the handle had a distinctive foil-like grip to enable a number of handling options. Many variations on the F–S fighting knife exist in regards to size of blade and particularly of handle. The design has influenced the design of knives throughout the many decades since its introduction.

== Basic knife fighting techniques ==
There are several ways a knife can be held for offensive or defensive use. The two most common are the forward and reverse grips.

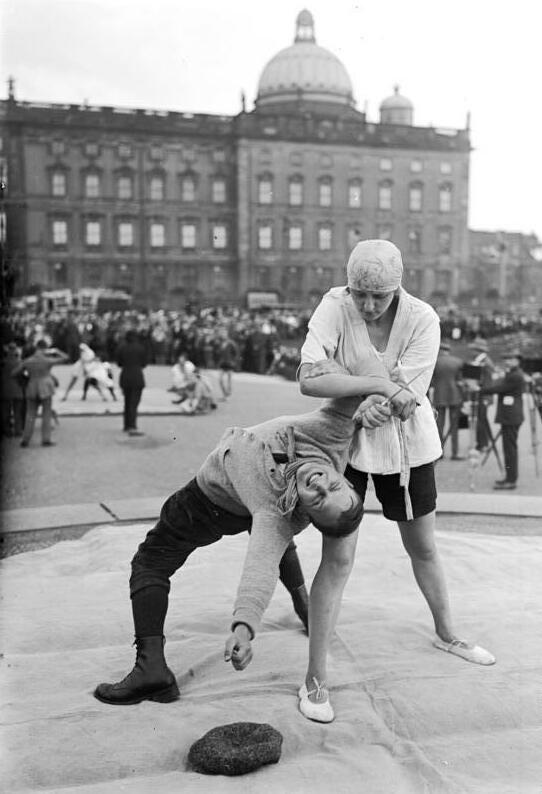
Demonstration of a jujutsu defense against a knife attack. Berlin, 1924.

Each grip has advantages and disadvantages. Holding the knife in one of the forward grips allows for more finesse and a longer reach, while a reverse grip allows for more power. The reverse grip is regarded as more difficult to master in knife-on-knife combat, as it may require additional skills in footwork and rapid defensive body movements to offset the increased danger of moving closer to one's opponent and the reach of their blade.

=== Forward grips ===
The following are variations of the forward grip:

- Hammer grip – the hand is wrapped around the knife handle, with the thumb on top of the fist, as if gripping a hammer
- Saber grip – the hand is wrapped around the knife handle, while the thumb is placed on the top of either the handle or the spine of the blade
- Modified saber grip – as before, but with the thumb wedged against the flat dimension of the blade.
- Palm grip – the knife handle lies diagonally across the outstretched palm, while the thumb is pressed flat against either the forward end of the handle or (optionally) the blade's ricasso.
- Filipino grip – same as the hammer grip, except that the thumb is placed along the spine, either floating above or in contact with it. The grip is based on Filipino Martial Arts concepts.
- Forward grip edge up – similar to a saber grip, but with the knife handle rotated along the axis of the forearm, so the edge is facing upwards.

=== Reverse grips ===
The following are variations of the reverse grip:

- Slash attack – aka "reverse grip edge out" or RGEO, where the hand is wrapped around the handle with the blade end next to the little finger (opposite side of the hand from the thumb) with edge facing outward towards the opponent.
- Icepick grip – aka the pakal grip. The knife is held in a hammer grip but with blade reversed. This grip is usually used in concert with an overhand and downward thrusting or stabbing stroke. While the icepick grip is frequently employed by untrained knife users (esp. persons of lesser strength in an attempt to increase thrusting force), it may also be used by a skilled knife fighter as part of a sophisticated system that includes footwork and body movements including parrying and deception defenses. The major risk with this grip is that the blade is facing the user and can potentially fold back into the user's body.

== See also ==
- Knife fights in film
- Butterfly knife
