= Chupilca del diablo =

The Chupilca del diablo (The Devil's Chupilca) is a drink composed of a mixture of black gunpowder with aguardiente, typically wine, and sometimes flour. In myth, it was prepared and consumed by Chilean soldiers during the War of the Pacific. The soldiers who consumed the drink are said to have gone berserk in battle and attack their enemies without fear or remorse.

Chupilca can refer to a different mixture, made of chicha or wine with toasted flour.
