= Joaquín Ferrándiz Ventura =

Spanish serial killer (born 1963)

Joaquín Ferrándiz
- Born: Joaquín Ferrándiz Ventura; 1963 (age 62–63); Valencia, Spain
- Other names: Chimo; The Castellón Killer; The Raping Quixote
- Penalty: 69 years of prison

Details
- Victims: 5
- Span of crimes: 1995–1996
- Country: Spain
- State: Castellón province
- Date apprehended: 29 July 1998

Joaquín Ferrándiz Ventura (born 1963) is a Spanish abductor, rapist and (later) serial killer who murdered five women in the Spanish province of Castellón between 2 July 1995 and 14 September 1996. He was liberated in July 2023 and currently resides in Andoain, Spain.

== Early life ==
Ferrándiz was born in Valencia, Spain in 1963. He was the first of three siblings.

== First rape and incarceration ==
Ferrándiz's first crime took place on 6 August 1989, when he deliberately ran over an 18-year-old female motorcyclist named María. The crash was non-fatal, but the victim broke her ankle. Ferrándiz exited his car and approached María, feigning apology and inviting her into his vehicle in order, he claimed, to drive her to the hospital. Once inside, he drove her to an isolated area and raped her, before subsequently abandoning her near the hospital. Ferrándiz was identified by another motorist who had witnessed the collision.

Ferrándiz was arrested and sentenced to fourteen years in prison for this crime. For the duration of his incarceration, he shared his cell with another criminal who had killed his wife. After his release, Ferrándiz would imitate the modus operandi of this cellmate in his own murders. In 1995, he was paroled following a campaign by his friends and family that claimed his innocence and decried his internment as unjust. His good behaviour during his time in prison, when he collaborated in the prison newsletter La Saeta, was cited as a reason for his early release.

Upon his release, Ferrándiz moved to Castellón de la Plana with his mother and worked in a car insurance company. His co-workers described him as "absolutely normal", polite and charming. Ferrándiz committed all of his later crimes during weekends, in party areas in and around the city of Castellón.

== Murders ==
Sonia Rubio Arrufat, a 25-year-old English teacher, was last seen at 5:00 a.m. on the morning of 2 July 1995, leaving a Benicàssim disco that she had attended with friends. She intended to walk the one kilometre distance between the disco and her parents' apartment in Benicàssim, but she never reached her destination. Her body was found by a motorist on November 20, hidden in thick bushes near the road between Benicàssim and Orpesa. She was half-dressed, with her hands tied and her mouth covered with duct tape. The Spanish Civil Guard code-named the investigation of Rubio's murder Operación Bola de Cristal ("Operation Crystal Ball").

The following year, in September 1996, 22-year-old Amelia Sandra García Costa disappeared. She, too, was last seen leaving a disco in Castellón. Her half-dressed body, also with her hands tied, was found in a pond of Onda in February 1997. Her murder was immediately linked to Rubio's due to the similarities between the victims and the perpetrator's modus operandi. In February 1998, Ferrándiz attempted to repeat his 1989 attack on another female motorist, but the victim fought back and escaped after biting his finger. She was able to give police a full description of her attacker, as well as part of his car plate. With this information, the Civil Guard launched an operation to monitor Ferrándiz. They noticed that he regularly visited an area of Castellón called "Los Cipreses," where there was a high concentration of discos and night-clubs, and that whilst there, he acted strangely, as if he was stalking different women in order to identify a potential victim. It is believed that Ferrándiz did not know any of his victims personally, but that he watched them for a long period before striking. Ferrándiz attempted another attack in July 1998, when he deflated the tyre of a woman's car before she left a nearby nightclub. The woman suffered a non-fatal car crash, but Ferrándiz could not abduct her as he had intended. This incident was witnessed by plain-clothes Guardia Civil officers, who arrested Ferrándiz in his office a few days later, on 29 July. A parallel search of his home found the roll of duct tape that he had used to gag Sonia Rubio, tying him to the first crime.

Ferrándiz initially admitted to the rape of two women, but he denied involvement in any murders. He was charged with Rubio's abduction, sexual assault and murder. By 21 October, however, he had admitted to killing Rubio, García and three prostitutes whose skeletonized bodies had been found in a riverbank near Vila-real in early 1996: Natalia Archelos Olaria (24), Mercedes Vélez Ayala (18), and Francisca Salas León (24). These three murders had been investigated as related to each other but had not been linked to the murders of Rubio or García, and a truck driver had been arrested as a suspect. Several psychiatric evaluations of Ferrándiz diagnosed him as a psychopath.

== Trial and sentence ==
Prosecutors requested 163 years in prison with the recommendation that Ferrándiz be never paroled again, and a fine of 200 million pesetas to compensate the families of all five victims. In addition, they also petitioned that the State be named secondarily responsible for not keeping Ferrándiz under the necessary surveillance after he was released from prison. On 14 January 2000, Ferrándiz was found guilty of five counts of murder, one of attempted murder, and another of imprudence resulting in injuries. Ferrándiz was sentenced to 69 years in prison and to compensate the families with 130 million. The State was acquitted.

He was released from custody in July 2023 after having served 25 years.

== See also ==
- Gustavo Romero Tercero
- Gilberto Chamba
- Jack Unterweger
- List of serial killers by country
