= Navaja =

Spanish folding-blade fighting and utility knife

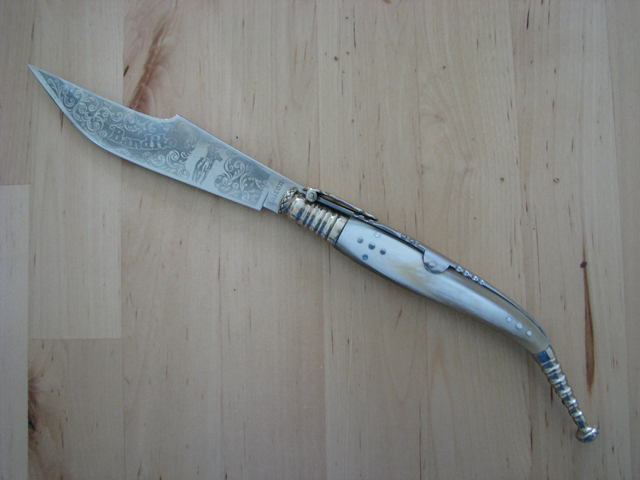
A contemporary navaja of traditional design, with a 5.5-inch (140 mm) blade

The navaja is a traditional Spanish folding-blade fighting and utility knife.

== Etymology ==
The etymology of the word navaja is derived from the Latin novacula, meaning razor, and the Andalusian knife known as the navaja is thought to have derived from the navaja de afeitar, or straight razor used for shaving.

A popular slang term for the navaja in the 19th century was herramienta, which translates as "(iron) tool".

In Spain, the term navaja is often used to generally describe all folding-blade knives and epitomized the concept of a defensive knife to be carried at all times on the person.

Most of the larger navajas of the early 19 centuries were clearly intended as fighting knives, and were popularly referred to as santólios, a contraction of the Spanish term for "holy oil".

The name was a reference to the oils or unguents applied to the dying as part of the Catholic last sacrament, as it was believed that a man encountering such a knife in a violent confrontation would invariably require administration of the last rites.

== History ==
While folding-blade knives existed in Spain even in pre-Roman times, the earliest Spanish knives recognizable as navajas date from around the late 1600s.

One of the oldest folding knife patterns still in production, the first true navajas originated in the Andalusian region of southern Spain.

== Design ==
The navaja used a variety of blade and handle styles over the years, with certain regions of Spain favoring distinct patterns. The classical Andalusian blade style is today popularly known as the navaja bandolera.

Many blade patterns bear a striking resemblance to that of the Bowie knife, and some historians believe the navaja's blade served as inspiration for the latter. Like the straight razor, the navaja's blade folds into the handle when not in use.

The classic Andalusian navaja of the craftsman era utilized forged carbon steel blades predominantly sourced from Spanish communities with a long history of swordmaking and cutlery manufacture, such as Albacete, Santa Cruz de Mudela, and Toledo.

The traditional navaja was typically fitted with a handle made of wood, horn, bone, or pierced copper or brass that was reinforced with a steel or brass liner, although examples can also be found with expensive materials such inlaid silver, ivory, and even gold.

From the mid-19th century, many 'Spanish' navajas were actually imported from France; most of these imported French patterns lack a locking device for the blade. Many examples of this period were fitted with metal bolsters and butt caps for additional strength and protection; these are often carved, filed, or engraved with decorations.

Navajas with blades over 200mm (23 inches) were mostly oversized showpieces (navajas de muestra or navajas de exposición), and were made to display the abilities of the knifemaker, not for actual use.

=== Early models ===
"Carraca"
The distinctive sound produced when a ratcheting navaja is opened.

Like the navaja de afeitar, the earliest navajas worked on the principle of the simple peasant's knife, with no backspring to hold the blade in place once opened.

These early navajas were primarily designed as utility or work knives, and could easily be carried either openly or concealed on one's person.

One of the more common early varieties of this type of knife was the navaja cortaplumas, used by clerical workers, draftsmen, and notaries to sharpen ink quill tips.

With the development of reliable spring steel in Spain, the navaja could be fitted with a tempered steel, externally mounted backspring, making the design much more useful.

The new spring-back navaja proved very popular throughout Spain and was later exported to or manufactured in other countries as well, particularly France and the island of Corsica.

==== Improvements ====
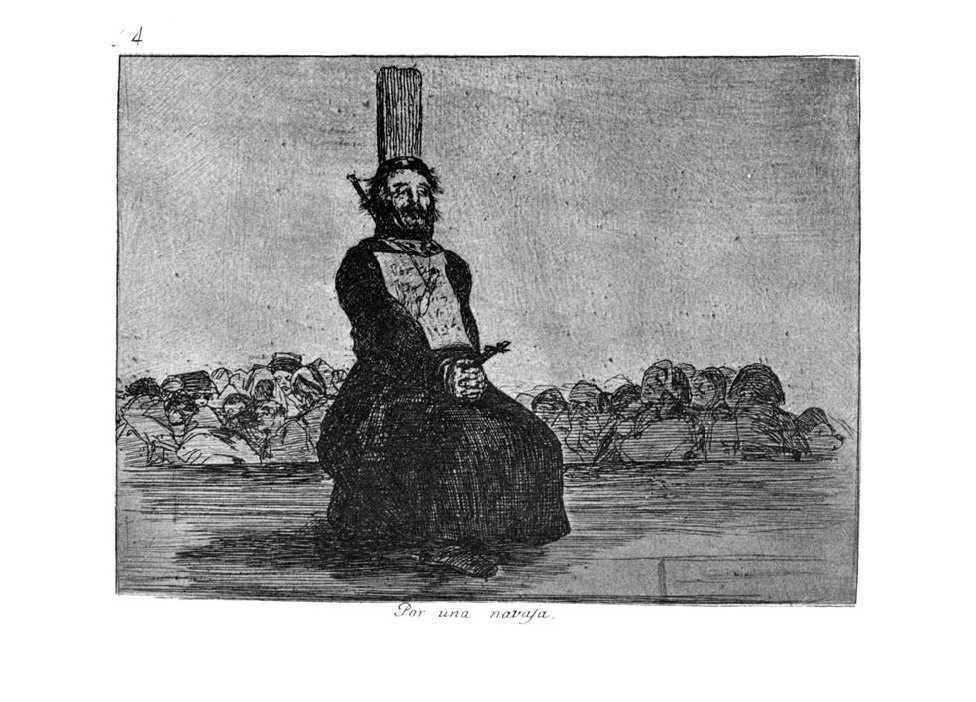
A priest executed by garotte by French forces under Napoleon for carrying a navaja

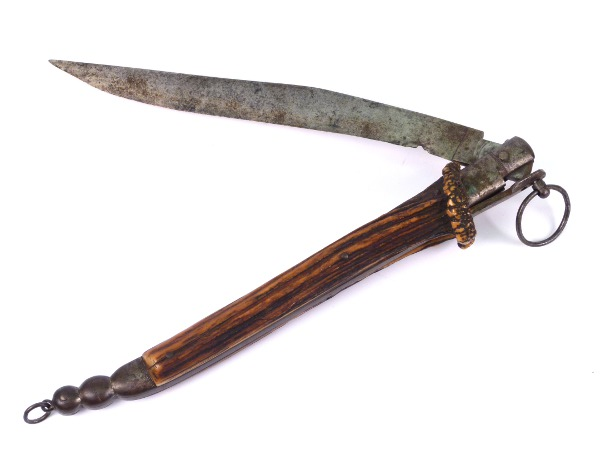
Navaja dating to c. 1790; it has a yataghan style blade, a stag-horn handle and the pull-ring for disengaging the blade-locking mechanism is clearly visible

During the first part of the 18th century, the blade heel and backspring of the navaja were cleverly altered to provide a locking device for the blade.

Pulling open the blade from the handle, the lock allowed the blade to rotate into the fully open position, where it locked into position.

The locking mechanism itself consisted of pinion teeth (piñones or dientes) cut into the blade heel (talón de la hoja) that are engaged by a lug attached to either the backspring or a separate spring-loaded metal latch as the knife is opened. The last pinion tooth serves to keep the blade locked in its fully opened position.

Around 1850, a metal pull ring was incorporated into the lock to facilitate blade closure. Pulling the metal ring cammed the backspring upward, freeing the blade from its lock and allowing the blade to fold back into the handle. The pull ring was eventually discarded in favor of a low-profile metal lever.

Aside from the early navaja cortaplumas, the design is thought to have been first adopted by the working classes - mule drivers, teamsters, artisans, and sailors as well as by the majos, the "gentlemen of the lower class" of Andalusia.

=== Modern models ===
The typical navaja manufactured today blends traditional styling with modern materials.

Most are smaller in blade length and overall size than the navaja carried during the classical era. The majority feature stainless steel blades, stainless metal bolsters and butt caps, and horn or wood handles.

Many different blade patterns are available, with hand-made (artesanal) versions commanding the highest prices.

While the ratcheting carraca can still be found on some knives, most examples now use a simplified locking mechanism consisting of a lug attached to the backspring that engages a single slot machined into the blade's heel.

== Variants ==
=== Navaja de muelles ===
The ratcheting-tooth lock-blade navaja was commonly referred to as a navaja de muelles or navaja de siete muelles.

The metal-to-metal contact produces a distinctive clicking or ratcheting sound when the blade is opened, and the navaja de muelles was popularly termed the carraca in consequence.

With its locking blade, the navaja de muelles was now a fighting knife, able to deliver thrusts as well as slashes (cuts).

The navaja de muelles developed later proved sufficiently formidable as an offensive arm that it was specifically named by the Marqués de la Mina, the Spanish military governor of Catalonia, in his edict of 29 May 1750 prohibiting the carrying of armas blancas, or edged weapons.

Despite official disapproval, the navaja de muelles became popular throughout Spain as a fighting and general utility knife, and was the primary personal arm of the Spanish guerrilleros who opposed Napoleon during his invasion and subsequent occupation of Spain in the Peninsular War of 1808–1814.

=== Navaja bandolera ===
The navaja bandolera is a variation of what is termed a "clip point" blade, a design featuring a concave unsharpened false edge near the blade tip. Compared to its slim, almost feminine handle, the exaggerated belly and recurved blade of the classical navaja is particularly large and menacing.

=== Navaja sevillana ===
The large-bladed fighting navaja or santólio was eventually refined into a pattern named the navaja sevillana, after the region in which it saw much use.

The navaja sevillana was a fighting knife characterized by a ratcheted locking mechanism, a long and slender blade with a prominent clip, a needle-sharp point, and a finely honed, razor-sharp cutting edge.

== Usage ==
=== Civilian use ===
In Spain the carrying of a navaja did not necessarily identify its owner as a criminal.

During the first part of the 19th century, the navaja was carried by Spanish men—and not a few women—of all classes and backgrounds, including the upper classes, the clergy, and the aristocracy.

Evidence of this rests in museum collections of ornate antique examples, all featuring a standard of costly materials and laborious craftsmanship that could only have been commissioned by the upper classes.

The imposition of laws restricting the carrying of swords and other offensive weapons in Spain and in the Kingdom of Naples in southern Italy only served to increase the popularity of concealable knives such as the navaja in a culture devoted to edged weapons.

Towards the end of the 19th century, use of the navaja began to decline in Spain. However, for the working classes and those living in the provinces, who were loath to give up cherished customs, the navaja remained a habitual item of personal wear for many years afterwards.

=== Criminal world ===
The rise in popularity of the navaja occurred at a time of increased restrictions upon the wearing of swords and other bladed weapons by persons outside the Spanish nobility.

Its association with barateros, pícaros, jácaros and rufos (gamblers, rogues, ruffians, and thugs) comes from its frequent use as a weapon of the underworld, where it was often used to enforce the collection of gambling debts or to rob innocent victims.

By 1903 the navaja had become a weapon of stealth, always concealed and "never worn or used ostentatiously."

With the advent of mass-produced, low-priced handguns and an increasingly effective national police force, the Guardia Civil, the lock-blade navaja had become the weapon of choice of the lawless and the disreputable.

While most of Spain at that time was about as safe as Victorian London, travel alone after dark was never advisable given occasional encounters with brigands and thieves.

The ominous click-clack of a navaja de muelles was a sound dreaded by lone travellers attempting to negotiate lonely rural highways or the Byzantine back streets of medieval Spanish cities after dark.

The knife's popularity among lawless elements in Spain is attested to in James Loriega's book Sevillian Steel. Loriega writes,

Navajas crossed the hands and drew the blood of soldiers and sailors, rogues and ruffians, and diplomats and aristocrats both in and out of Spain's borders. The use of the navaja fostered a mystique, not only from Seville's back streets, but also from the seedy waterfronts of Barcelona, and the cosmopolitan promenades of Madrid. Regardless of their original intent, the navaja represented the ultimate means for resolving disagreements, misunderstandings, and problems that arose in dockside bars, darkened alleys, and an untold number of places not found in any guidebook; places where there is little reliance on legal recourses; places where you either catch a glimpse of steel and live - or miss it, and never know why you died.

=== As collectibles ===
The appeal of navaja's distinctive design and cultural symbol proved irresistible to foreign visitors to Spain.

Demand for the navaja as a collectible and as a tourist's souvenir is not a new one; as early as 1858, navajas were being widely offered in street markets in novelty lengths as short as three inches and as long as three feet.

=== As fighting knives ===
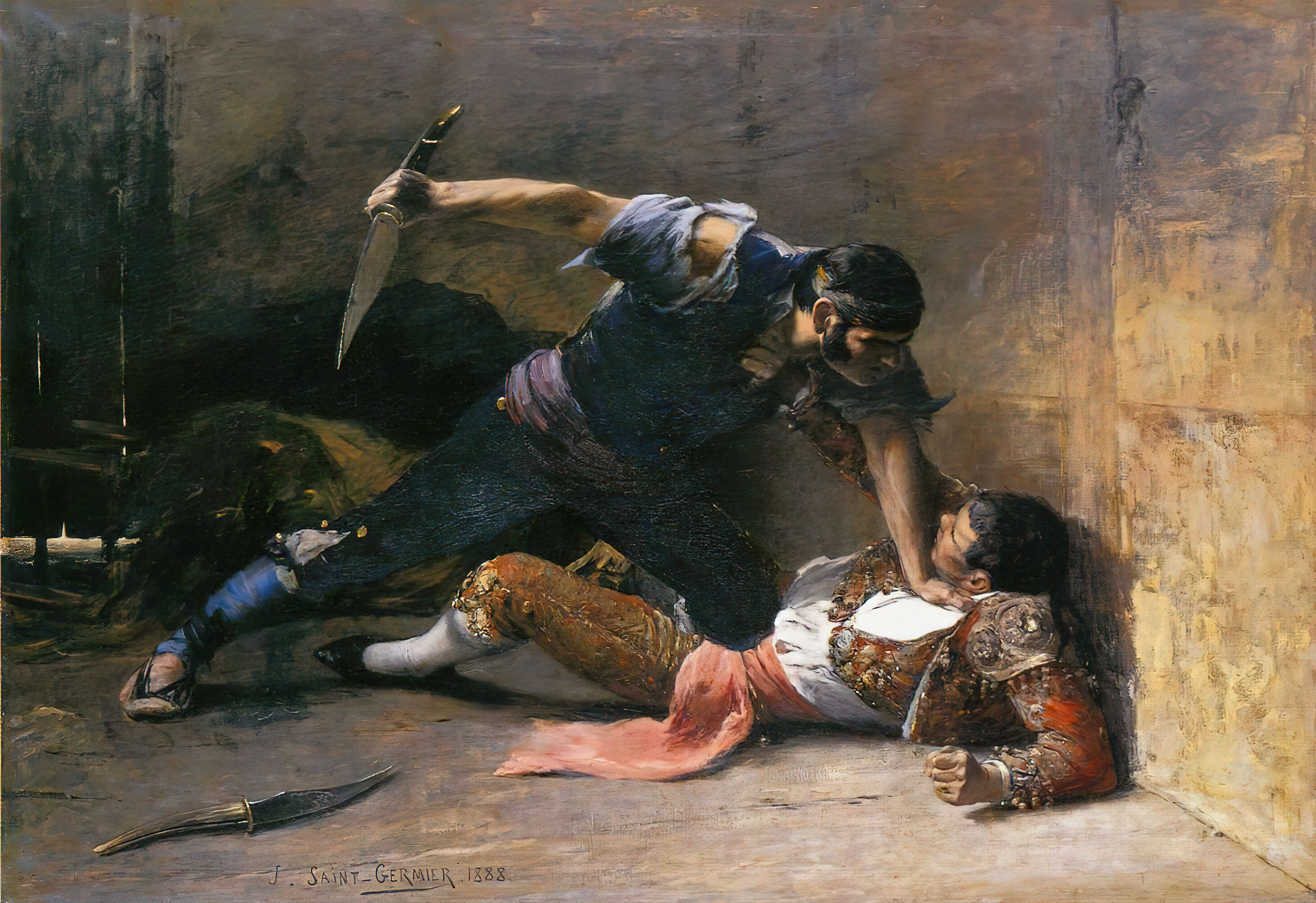
Painting by the French artist Joseph Saint-Germier "La Navaja", 1888. The painting depicts a fight to the death using specific Spanish Navajа knives.

The navaja was first adopted as a fighting knife by the peoples of Andalusia in southern Spain, including the Spanish Romani people of the day, the Gitanos.

In this part of Spain, knife fighting was regularly taught as a skill, often passed down from father to son as a rite of passage to adulthood.

Among navaja aficionados, the barateros of Málaga and Seville were cited as the most skilled practitioners of fighting with the navaja:

The skill displayed by the Spanish desperado in handling his knife is wonderful. This weapon, to which all are so partial, is a wicked-looking affair, from one to two feet long, and called a navaja from its resemblance to a razor. The blade is of the finest Toledo steel...

In 18th and 19th century Spain esgrimas de navaja (fencing, or knife-fighting schools) could be found in the major cities and throughout Andalusia, particularly in Cordoba, Málaga, and Seville.

As time went on, these schools began to depart from teaching traditional sword-fighting and fencing techniques in favor of simplified attacks and defenses based largely on the concept of deception, distraction, and counterstrike.

As one English author noted,

Defence with the navaja has been reduced to a science, which has its regular school of instruction. The teachers give lessons with wooden knives, and the most noted among them have their private strokes, which are kept secret for cases of emergency. The arts of the most accomplished swordsman are worthless, when opposed to those of an expert with the navaja. With his cloak or jacket wrapped about his left arm, his formidable weapon glittering in his right hand, and his lithe body poised for a spring, he is an interesting study for the spectator, as well as for his antagonist. The thumb is pressed tightly along the back of the blade, that every advantage may be taken of the flexibility of the wrist, in a struggle where the space of an inch is often a matter of life and death. The postures and guards are changed with bewildering rapidity, and, should the right hand be disabled, the cloak and knife are shifted in the twinkling of an eye, and the duel proceeds, until one or both the combatants are killed.

The firmly established knife fighting tradition with the navaja in Andalusian Spain would later spread to other Spanish-speaking countries, from Argentina to Puerto Rico to the Philippines as part of el legado andalusí (the Andalusian legacy, or tradition).

Used as a fighting knife, the navaja typically featured a blade length of 400 mm (15 inches) or longer, and knives with 300 mm (12-inch) to 500 mm (19-inch) blades were common.

During the 18th and most of the 19th century, large navajas were traditionally worn pushed into a belt or sash, with the distinctively curved, fish-shaped handle left exposed to ease removal.

An exception to the predominance of large-bladed sevillanas was the salvavirgo ("chastity knife"), a small knife carried by Andalusian women in a bodice or leg garter as a weapon of self-defense.

After more than two centuries of popular and continuous use, demand for the navaja as a large fighting or utility knife began to ebb in the early 20th century.

Reduced in size and length (navaja corta), the design still enjoys some popularity as a pocketknife and utility blade, and both mass-produced and individually hand-built knives of varying craftsmanship and material quality continue to be sold in Spain, primarily to tourists, collectors, and edged weapon enthusiasts.

The decline in popularity of the large fighting navaja sevillana may have been accelerated by the passage of stringent laws in Spain and in the rest of the European Union proscribing the possession and/or carrying of armas blancas.

== See also ==
- Dagger
- Dirk
- Facón
- Corvo (knife)
- Fighting knife
- Knife fight
- Laguiole knife
- Okapi (knife)
- Douk-Douk

== General and cited references ==
- Loriega, James. Sevillian Steel: The Traditional Knife-Fighting Arts of Spain. Paladin Press. ISBN 1-58160-039-9.
- Loriega, James. Manual of the Baratero: The Art of Handling the Navaja, the Knife, and the Scissors of the Gypsies. Paladin Press. ISBN 1-58160-471-8.
