= Civil War reenactment =

Civil War reenactment may refer to:

- American Civil War reenactment
- Renaissance reenactment
- The Sealed Knot (reenactment), UK
