= The Vikings Canada =

The Vikings - Vinland
- Location: Canada, United States
- Period: Early Middle Ages
- Earliest year portrayed: 790
- Latest year portrayed: 1066
- Parent group: The Vikings
- Member groups: Fenvald, Fjellborg Vikings, Suthrland, Odin's Ravens, Austlend and Mikillbjarg
- Website: www.vinlandvikings.org

The Vikings - Vinland is an organization of Viking reenactors, consisting of 5 local member-groups in Alberta, Canada, as well as Wyoming and Colorado.

In 2006, were united into one governing body. All members of The Vikings - Vinland are full members of a larger society known as The Vikings. Members focus on developing and presenting the reconstructed culture and lifestyle of the Norse in Vinland.

While the major concentration is on the 10th Century, some events are set in the wider period from 790 to 1066, with the appropriate modifications to dress and equipment used.

The organization's aim is to provide an accurate and educational portrayal of the Viking period, with an equal emphasis on the daily life of the period, and on the more warlike aspects of life in what was a formative period in European history. The organization was renamed to The Vikings - Vinland in 2020 to better reflect the diverse North American membership of the group.

Activities include the Danish Canadian National Museum, The Calgary Highland Games and various other cultural and living history events throughout the continent, specific to each member group's local schedule.

The Vikings - Markland In 2019 The Vikings- Vinland experienced an organizational split. member groups from the Canadian provinces of Saskatchewan, Manitoba and Ontario petitioned the parent organization, the UK based 'The Vikings', to create an independent felag for these member groups, which was granted.

== See also ==
- List of historical reenactment groups
