= Medieval reenactment =

Subcultural scene

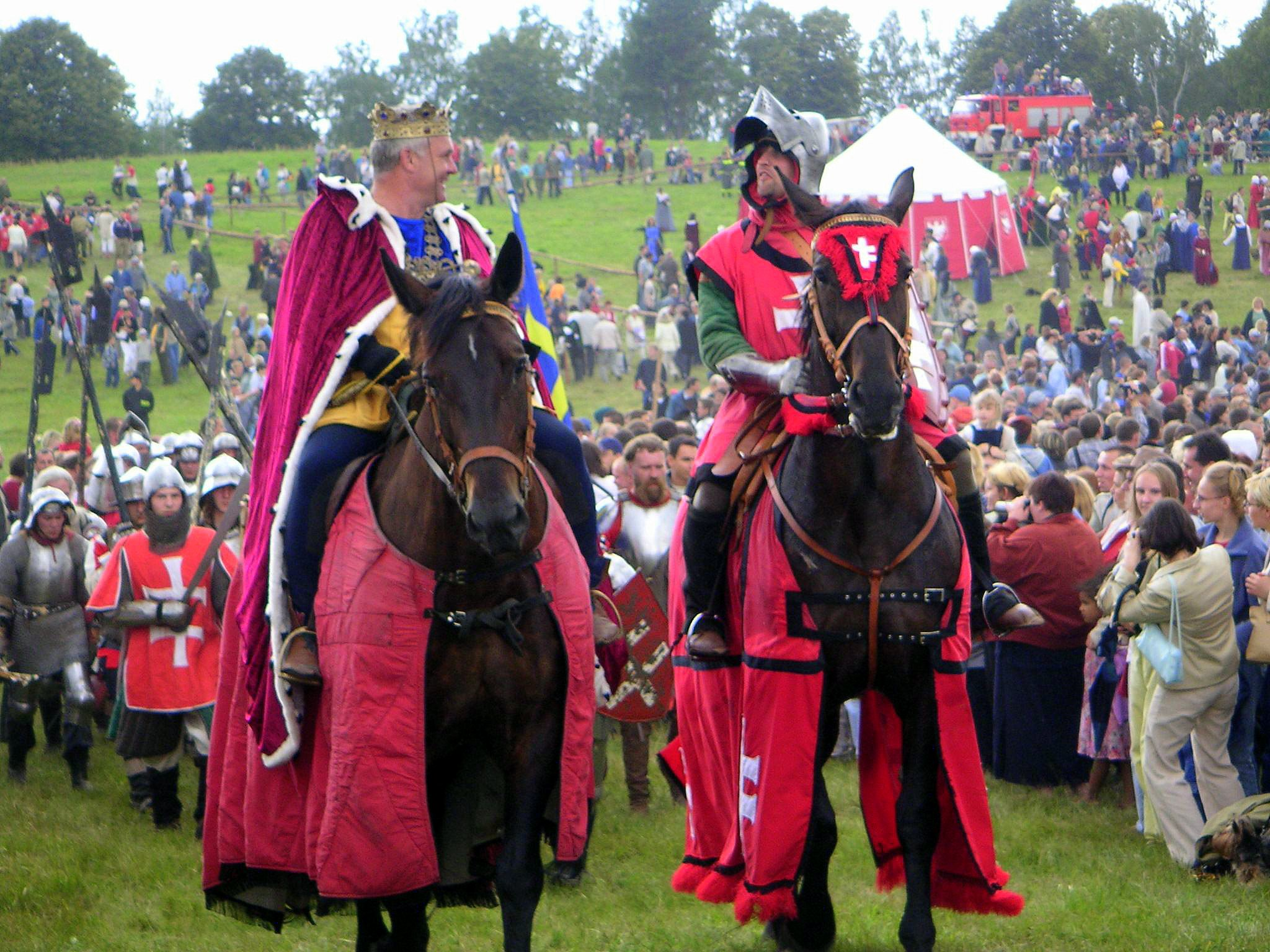
2003 reenactment of the 1410 Battle of Grunwald

Medieval reenactment is a genre of historical reenactment focusing on the European history of the Middle Ages, broadly the period from the Decline of the Roman Empire to about the end of the 15th century.

The first part of this period is sometimes called the Migration Period or Dark Ages by Western European historians, and as Völkerwanderung ("wandering of the peoples") by German historians. This term is usually reserved for the 5th and 6th centuries. Re-enactors who re-create the next period of history – 7th to 11th centuries – often refer to this as the Early Middle Ages. The 12th to 14th centuries fall under the term High medieval, while the 15th century is often termed Late medieval, though usage varies.

With such a wide range of eras, most medieval reenactment groups focus on a smaller time period, sometimes restricting their interest to a particular century, a specific decade, series of battles, or monarch, depending on how authentic the reenactment and encampment is intended to be.

== Types ==
Scholars distinguish several forms of medieval reenactment, ranging from living history demonstrations to the staged re-creation of combat and historical battles. Although reenactment is not limited to the Middle Ages, popular forms of medieval-focused performance include fairs, parades, performance reconstruction, Historical European martial arts, and buhurt.

=== Living history ===
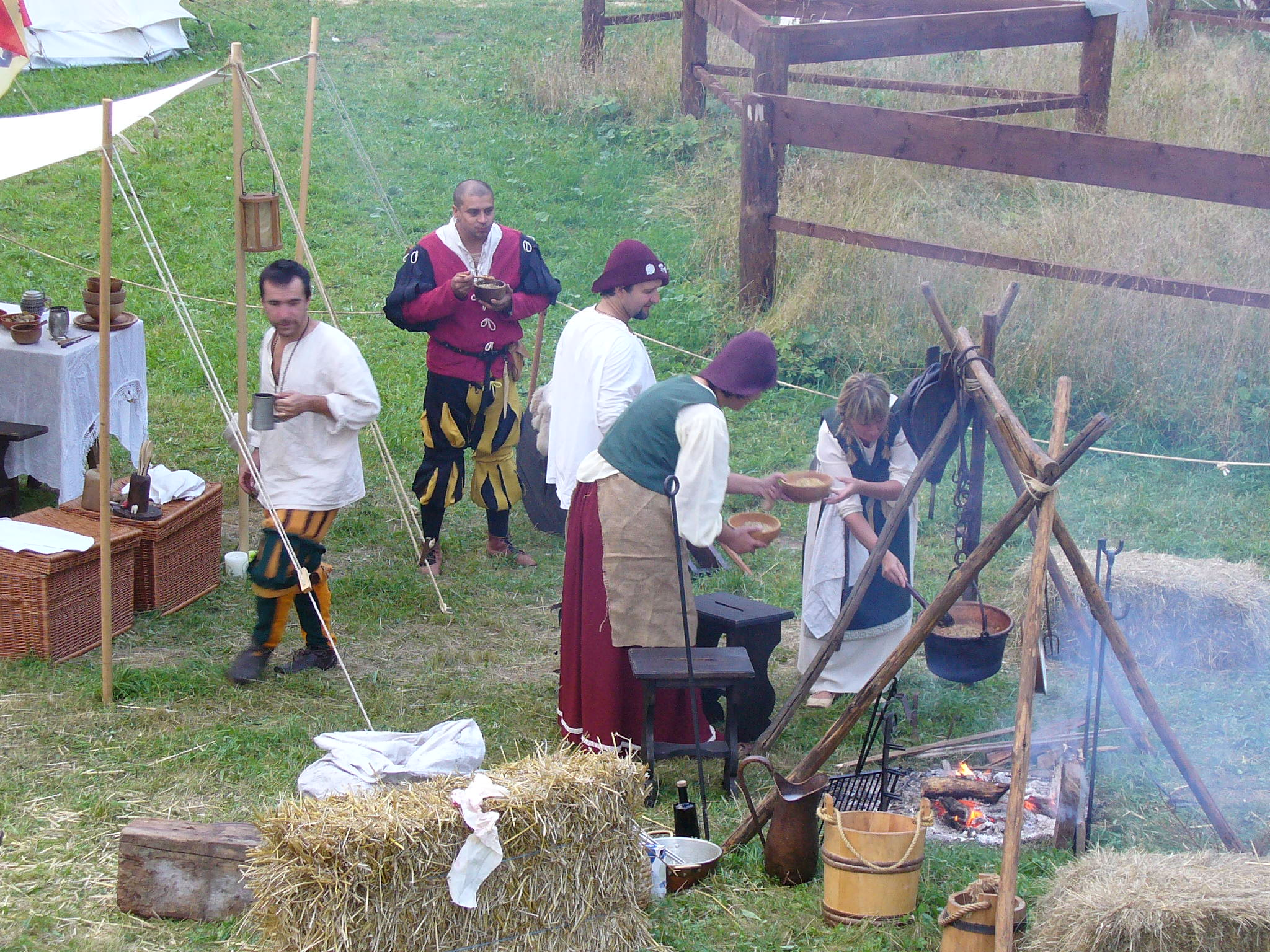
Reenactment of everyday life

Medieval period oriented living history groups and reenactors focus on recreating civilian or military life in the period of the Middle Ages. It is very popular in Eastern Europe. The goal of the reenactor and their group is to portray an accurate interpretation of a person who credibly could exist at a specific place at a specific point in time while at the same time remaining approachable to the public. Living history typically emphasizes the representation of everyday life within a historical period rather than the reenactment of a particular event. Examples of living history activities include authentic camping, cooking, practicing historical skills and trades, and playing historical musical instruments or board games.

In the United States Renaissance Fair participants generally borrow from a range of history and often incorporate fantasy or Hollywood-inspired elements into a presentation for public entertainment. In contrast, activities of the Society for Creative Anachronism (SCA) include everything from artistic disguises for modern items such as ice chests, to exhaustive research and authentic living history events.

=== Combat reenactment ===
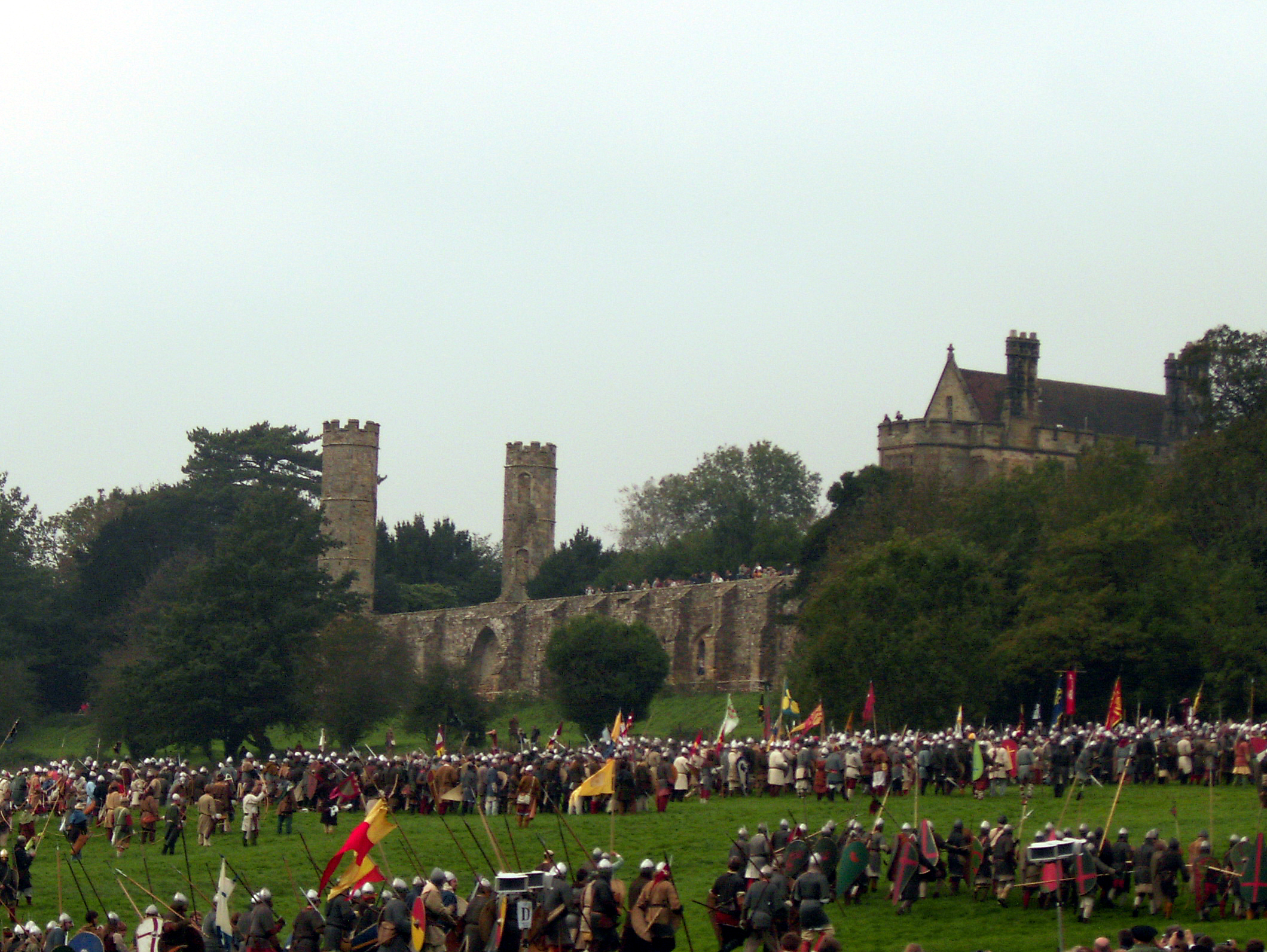
2006 reenactment of the 1066 Battle of Hastings

The principal aim of this sort of reenactment is to re-create historical battles or methods of combat. The variations range from training of historical dueling practices (usually with an appropriate period sword such as an arming sword or rapier and wrestling as a martial art), to reenactment of historical or legendary battles of the medieval period.

The Federation of the Wars of the Roses is a British-based society which specialises in reenactments of the 15th Century. It stages events at historical sites all over Britain, including those on or near actual battle sites. There are rules on weapons, clothing and armour which are observed by the Households that are Federation members. New Households wishing to enter the Federation are sponsored by established ones, and endure a probationary period to ensure standards are observed.

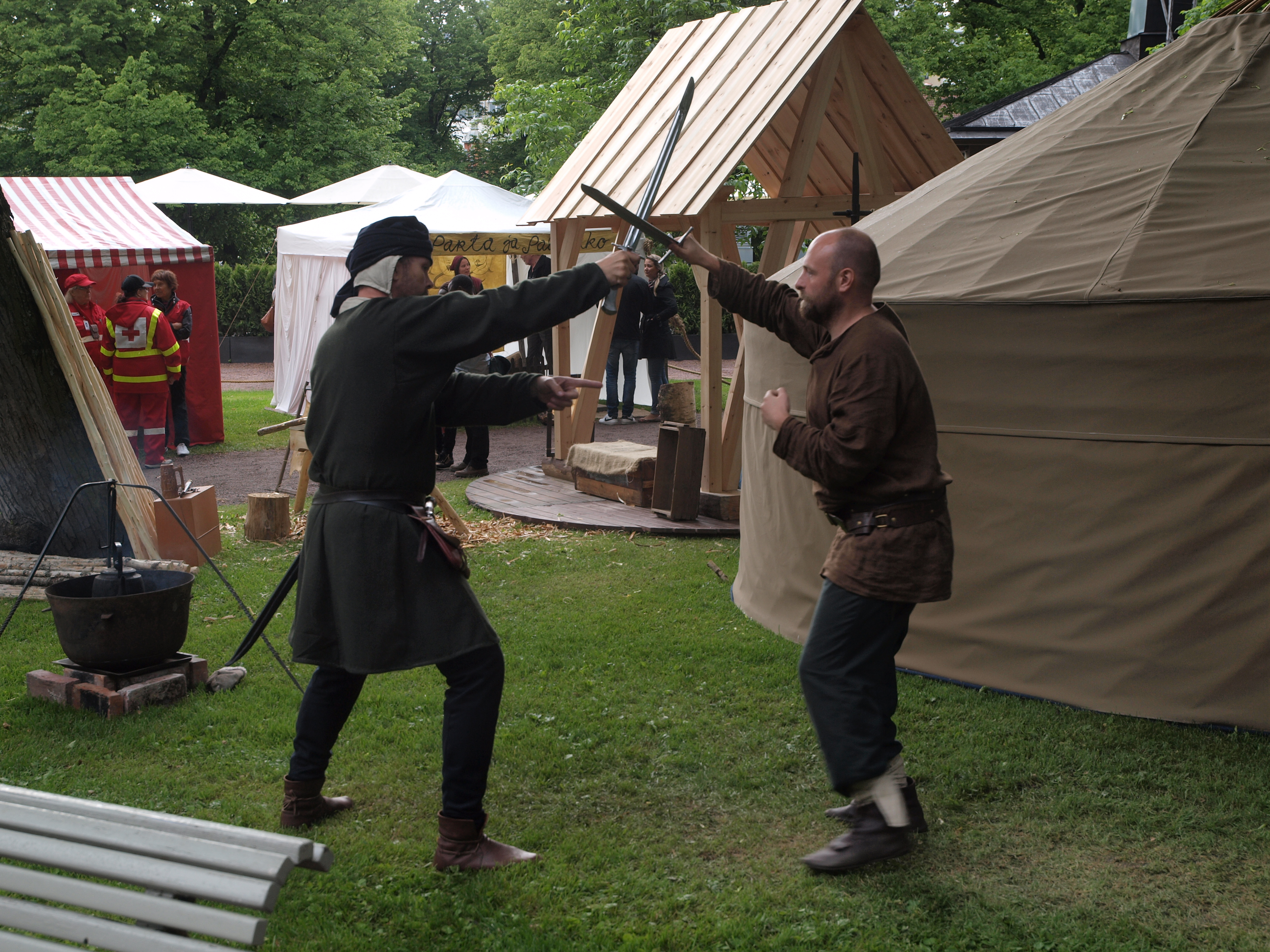
A sword fight at the Medieval Market of Turku in 2015

Some groups treating historical combat as a martial art do not fit the traditional definition of a reenactment group and are more similar to fencing clubs. An example is the SCA, which uses rattan swords to avoid injury. Others combine the sport with more traditional forms of reenactment, such as living history. It is usual to fight using more restricted target areas than in a real fight and with less speed and force, although some systems try to get as close to real combat as possible.

Historical European martial arts are forms of battle recreation that focus on reviving, studying and practicing sports that have been lost to time. The broader HEMA community emphasizes historical and archaeological evidence to ensure their practice of the sport is accurate. HEMA societies generally focus on a specific country's history of fighting style.

Many societies try to reenact actual battles on or near the battle site. These events are usually open to the public to watch. Other societies such as the SCA hire venues for private events, including combat, without any public present.

== Reenactment in Europe ==
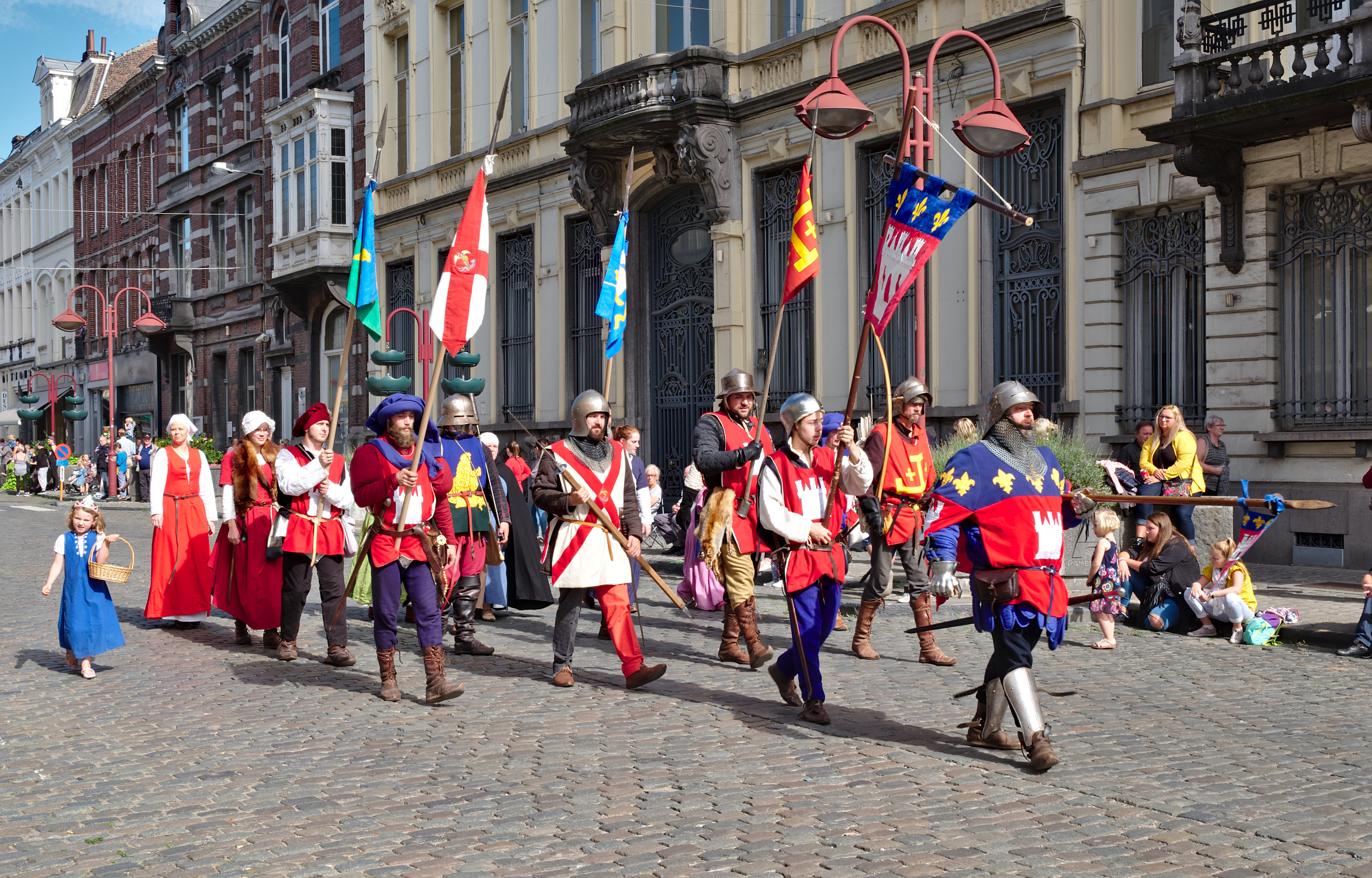
Reenactment during the Great Procession of Tournai

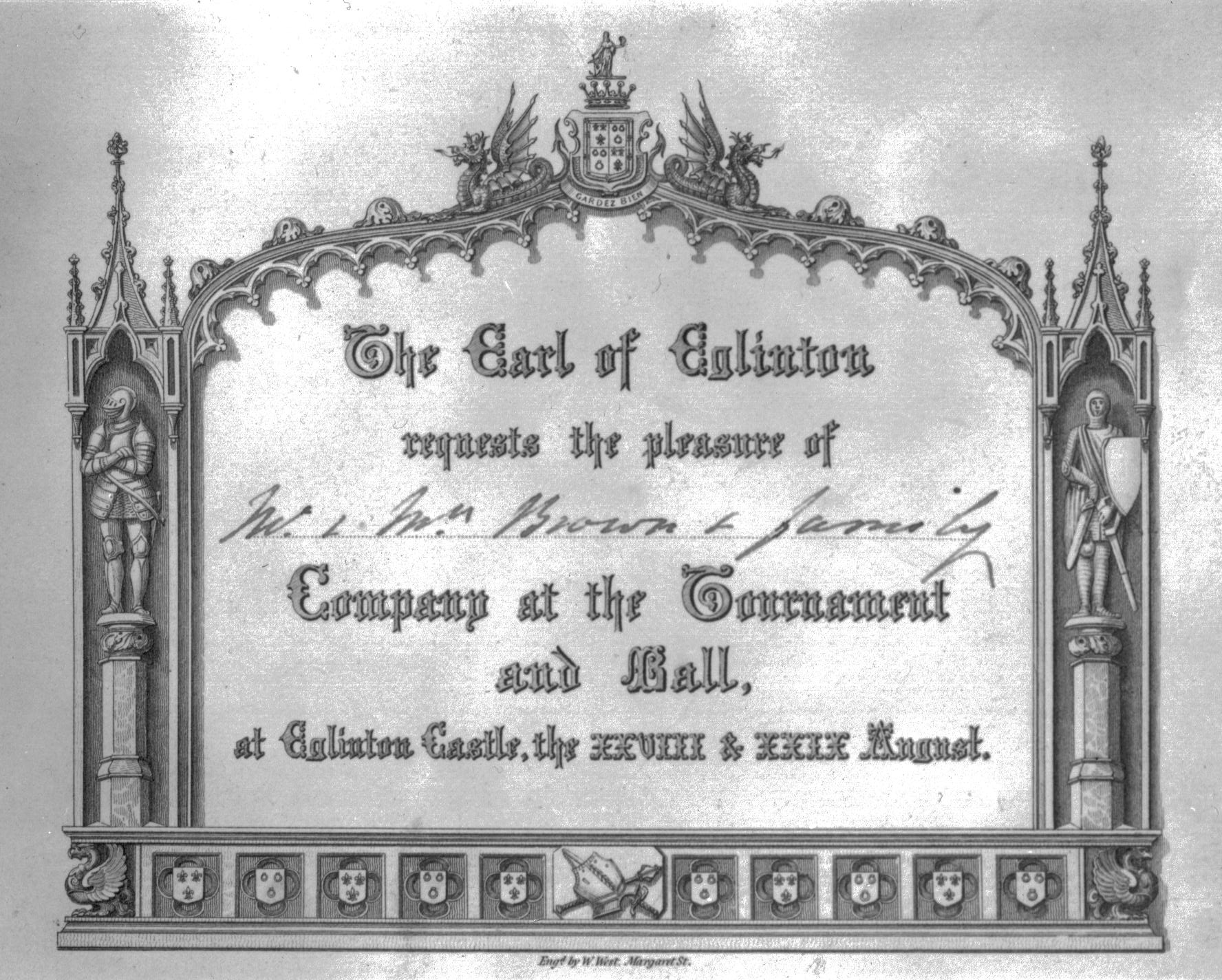
An official invitation to the Eglinton Tournament

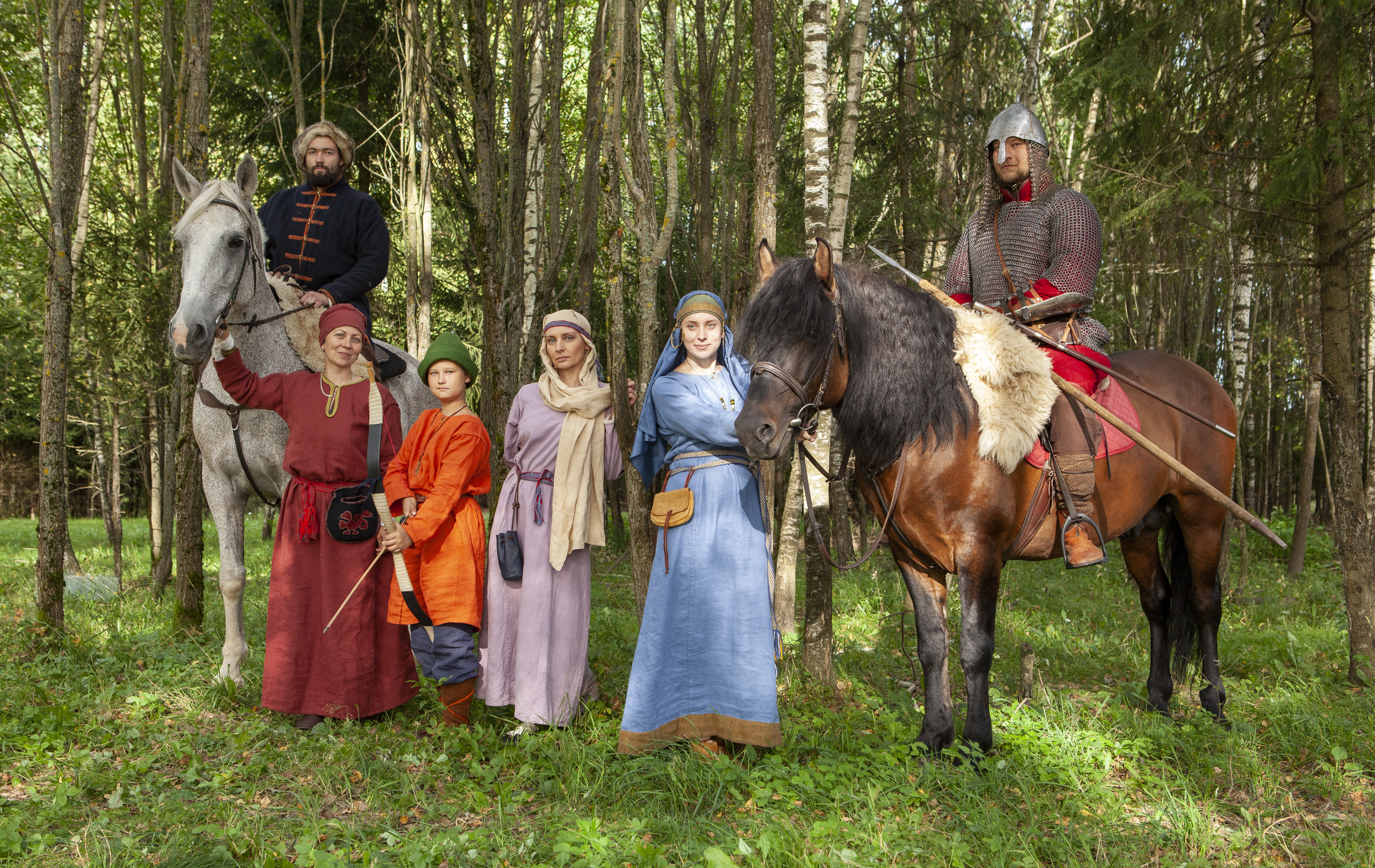
Modern stylized imagery of the Slavs of the 12th–13th centuries. Medieval living history in Russia. Historical Reconstruction Club from Ruzsky Urban District, Moscow Oblast.

There have been many isolated examples of medieval reenactment in Europe, notably the Eglinton Tournament of 1839. In modern times:

- Belgium: Belgium has at least two dozen separate groups of medieval reenactors, including the Order of the Hagelanders, the Gentsche Ghesellen and the Gruuthuse Household serving Louis de Gruuthuse.
- Denmark: The open air museum Middelaldercentret uses living history and historical reenactment to portray a part of a small Danish merchant town. Several reenactment groups exists in Denmark which are doing medieval reenactment at markets around the country.
- France: In France there is an annual reenactment of the Battle of Agincourt representing a battle of the Hundred Years War.
- Germany: Medieval reenactment is usually associated with living history and renaissance fairs and festivals as e.g. the Peter and Paul festival in Bretten., the Ritterfestspiele Bad Bentheim and the Kaltenberger Ritterturnier. In the past few years combat reenactment has gained some ground as well. A few groups are training historical combat such as longsword dueling and dussack fighting at universities, but the majority of combat reenactment groups are battlefield reenactment groups, some of which have become isolated to some degree because of a strong focus on authenticity (some groups refuse to fight groups representing different or wider periods, even if the combat practices would be entirely compatible otherwise). In general, the specific German approach of Authenticity (reenactment) is less about replaying a certain event, but to allow an immersion in a certain era. Historic city festivals and events are quite important to build up local communities and contribute to the self-image of municipalities. Events in monuments or on historical sites are less about the events related to them but as mere staffage for the immersion experience. Among many battlefield reenactors in Germany, the Codex Belli has become a de facto standard.
- Poland: A Battle of Grunwald reenactment every year on 15 July is the best known and attracts participants and visitors from many other countries. It is associated with living history and a medieval fair.
- Portugal: There are many medieval fairs throughout the country, but undoubtedly the largest historical recreation in the Iberian Peninsula is the Viagem Medieval em Terra de Santa Maria . This historical recreation depicts the reign of a different king in Portuguese history each year, so visitors can learn something new and witness completely different spectacles every year.
- Romania: Szeklerland, Transylvania has Hun, Szekler knight, early Hungarian and hussar reenactment groups and camps.
- Sweden: In Sweden there are many different "medieval markets". The largest is one in Gotland, held during an annual "Medieval Week".
- United Kingdom:medieval reenactment has been popular in the United Kingdom starting in the late 1960s. Many UK battles are reenacted at their original battle sites by enthusiasts with a high degree of authenticity, together with Medieval traders, musicians, caterers. UK reenactors can be seen throughout the country during the summer months at battles, fairs, carnivals, fetes, pubs and schools. Almost entirely throughout the UK, reenactors use blunted steel weapons for reenactments and rubber tipped arrows (blunts) for archers, or steel heads when target shooting. The largest early medieval event in the UK is the Battle of Hastings reenactment, which in 2006 had over 3600 registered participants and combined living history and combat reenactment. Most UK battles have at some point been reenacted such as the Battle of Lewes and the Battle of Evesham, many historical battles are reenacted annually from periods such as the Wars of the Roses, including the Battle of Bosworth Field and the Battle of Tewkesbury. Others are carried out at irregular intervals depending on the site availability and funding for the event, such as the Battle of Bannockburn.

== Reenactment in the United States ==
Medieval reenactment in the United States is practiced through a variety of educational and hobby-based organizations. One of the most prominent is the Society for Creative Anachronism (SCA), a nonprofit educational group founded in May 1966 in Berkeley, California. Events hosted by the SCA focus on teaching medieval skills and crafts such as archery, metalwork, and fiber arts.

Renaissance fairs also provide a popular space for public engagement with medieval reenactment. National Geographic journalist Kelly Faircloth reports that millions of Americans attend Renaissance fairs annually, noting their appeal as places for self-expression and creativity.

== See also ==
- Historical martial arts reconstruction
- List of historical reenactment groups
- Medieval Times – a US restaurant chain featuring Medieval combat theatre shows
- The Vikings (reenactment group)
- Regia Anglorum – a British reenactment society
- Vikings Of Middle England – a British reenactment society
- Armored combat (sport) – the modern full contact combat sport recreating medieval melee
