= Nare =

Nare may refer to:

== People ==
- Daniel Nare, Botswanan football manager
- Tadu Teshome Nare (born 2001), Ethiopian runner
- Théophile Naré (born 1966), Catholic bishop of Kaya, Burkina Faso
- Naré Kerobyan, winner of the Junior Eurovision Song Contest 2026 from Armenia

== Other meanings ==
- Nareh (given name) (or Nare, Nara), Armenian feminine name
- Nare River, northern Colombia

== See also ==
- Nares (disambiguation)
