= Regia Anglorum =

Medieval reenactment organisation

- Founded: 1986; 40 years ago in the United Kingdom
- Purpose: Historical reenactment
- Headquarters: United Kingdom
- Region served: Worldwide
- Members: About 700
- Website: regia.org

Regia Anglorum (A term used by early writers in Latin texts, meaning Kingdoms of the English [people]), or simply Regia, is a Medieval reenactment organisation reenacting the life and times of the peoples who lived in and around the Islands of Britain from the time of Alfred the Great to Richard the Lionheart. Its members portray Anglo-Saxon, Viking, Norman and British living history from the period before the Norman Conquest. The society has gained in popularity as a result of being featured in prominent television programmes such as Michael Wood on Beowulf, Time Team and A History of Britain.

It was founded in 1986 by members formerly of The Norse Film and Pageant Society (which went on to become called the Vikings) and has a large British membership. An unincorporated association, it claims to be one of the largest Early Middle Ages re-enactment societies in the world. The organisation comprises a number of local groups, mostly within the United Kingdom.

Regia Anglorum is an Associate Sponsor of the British Museum, and is a founder member of the National Association of Re-enactment Societies (NAReS) and The Battlefields Trust.

== Reconstruction and experimental archaeology ==
=== The Wychurst Project ===
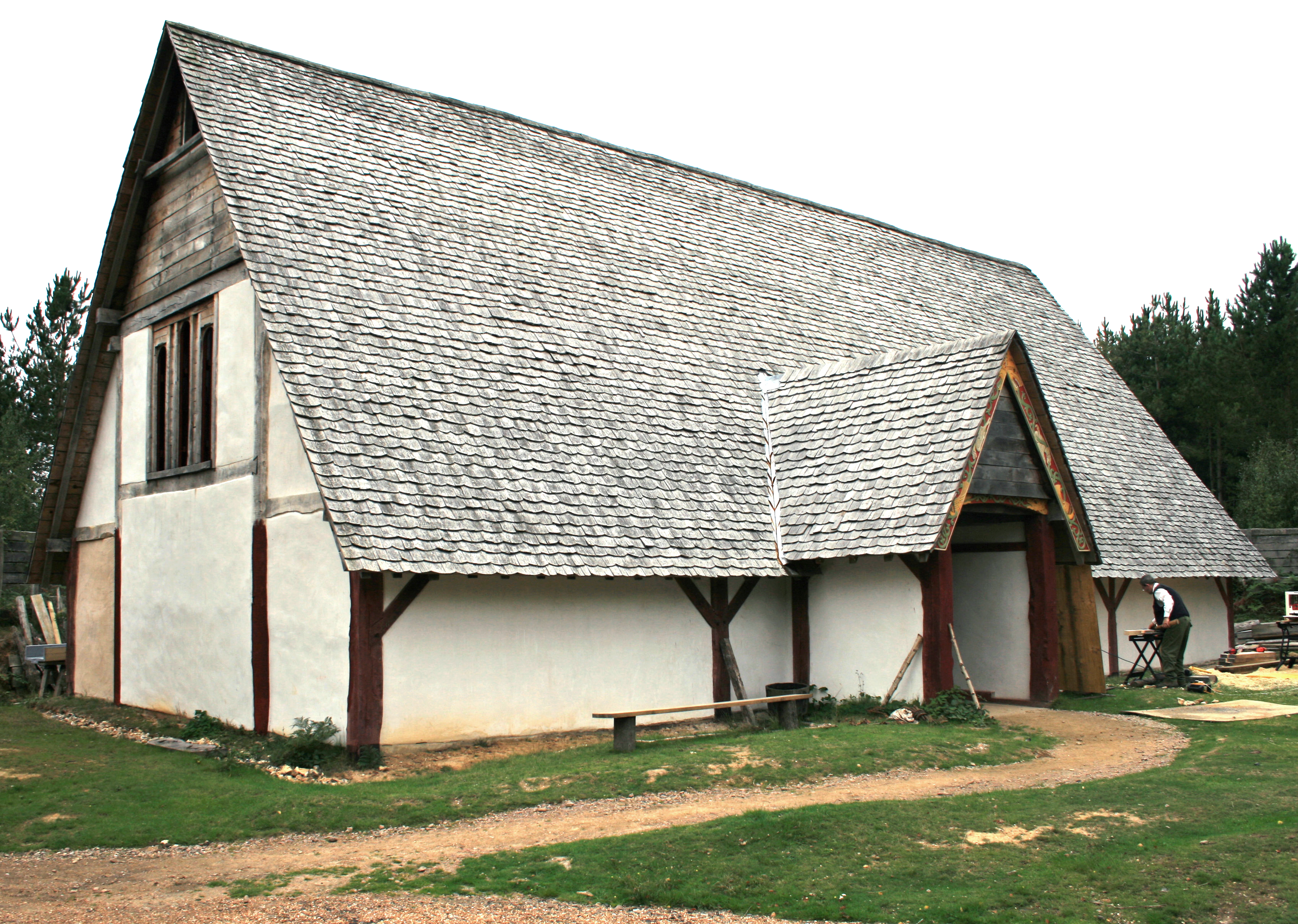
Reconstructed Anglo-Saxon hall from c. 1000 AD at Wychurst, Kent

The most high-profile of Regia Anglorum's activities is the Wychurst Project. On 3 acres (12,000 m^{2}) of freeheld land in Kent, the group built a full-scale replica of a defended manorial burgh and the flooded ring ditch and bank surmounted by 220 metres of palisade enclosing an acre of land. The centre of the burgh sits a Longhall, which at 60' × 30' × 30' (approx 20 × 10 × 10 metres) is by far the largest building of its kind in Britain.

The site is used for educational purposes and is open for public visits on special occasions. Regia Anglorum say that the primary purpose of the settlement is to enable the group's members to experience the lifestyle of the period in a more complete way than ever before. The site's name, Wychurst, is an Anglo-Saxon name meaning the village in the wood, is situated in woods near to the Wildwood Discovery Park 60 miles (97 km) from Central London near Canterbury in Kent.

=== Living history ===
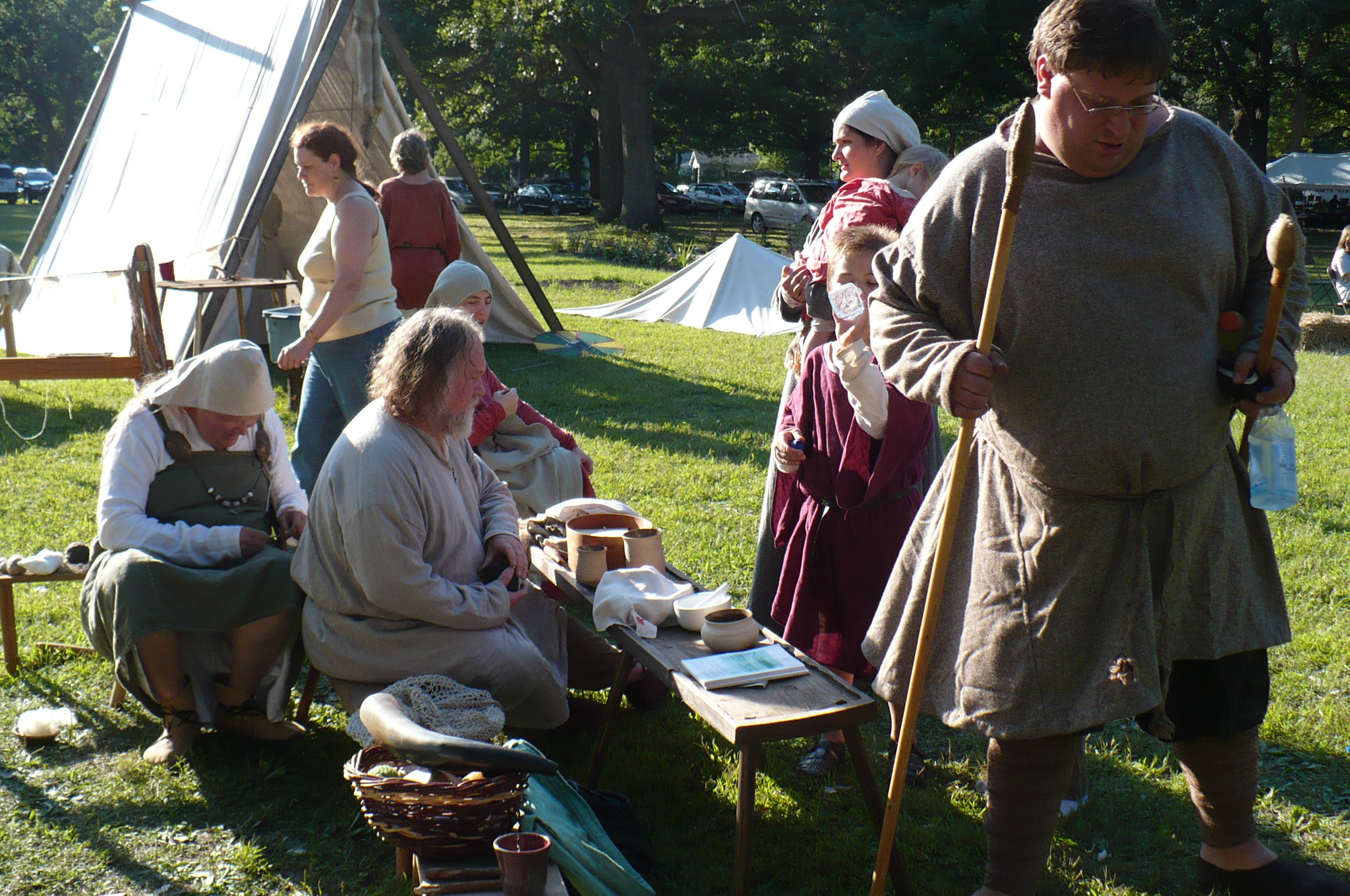
Living History portrayed by Regia Anglorum members in Illinois, US

Living history encampments are a major feature of most re-enactment societies. A range of tented structures is erected at many Regia Anglorum events, and members demonstrate a variety of crafts and everyday activities in their historical context.

=== Ships and sailing ===
Regia Anglorum currently owns seven vessels. The biggest, a 50'-long vessel, is no longer sea-worthy. Next are three similar hulls measuring 47' by 9' in the beam. Drawing about 3', they are suitable for use on inland waters and at sea in coastal waters. A 35' wooden replica is currently in use and sees constant use by the members for events and filmwork. They also own and operate two 20' smallcraft, one a generic shape for European waters, the other a replica of the Gokstad Faering and that too is in constant use at events throughout the UK in the course of a year.

The society's vessels are often used at events and in films on both the big and small screen, including Game of Thrones and Vikings.

== Other activities ==
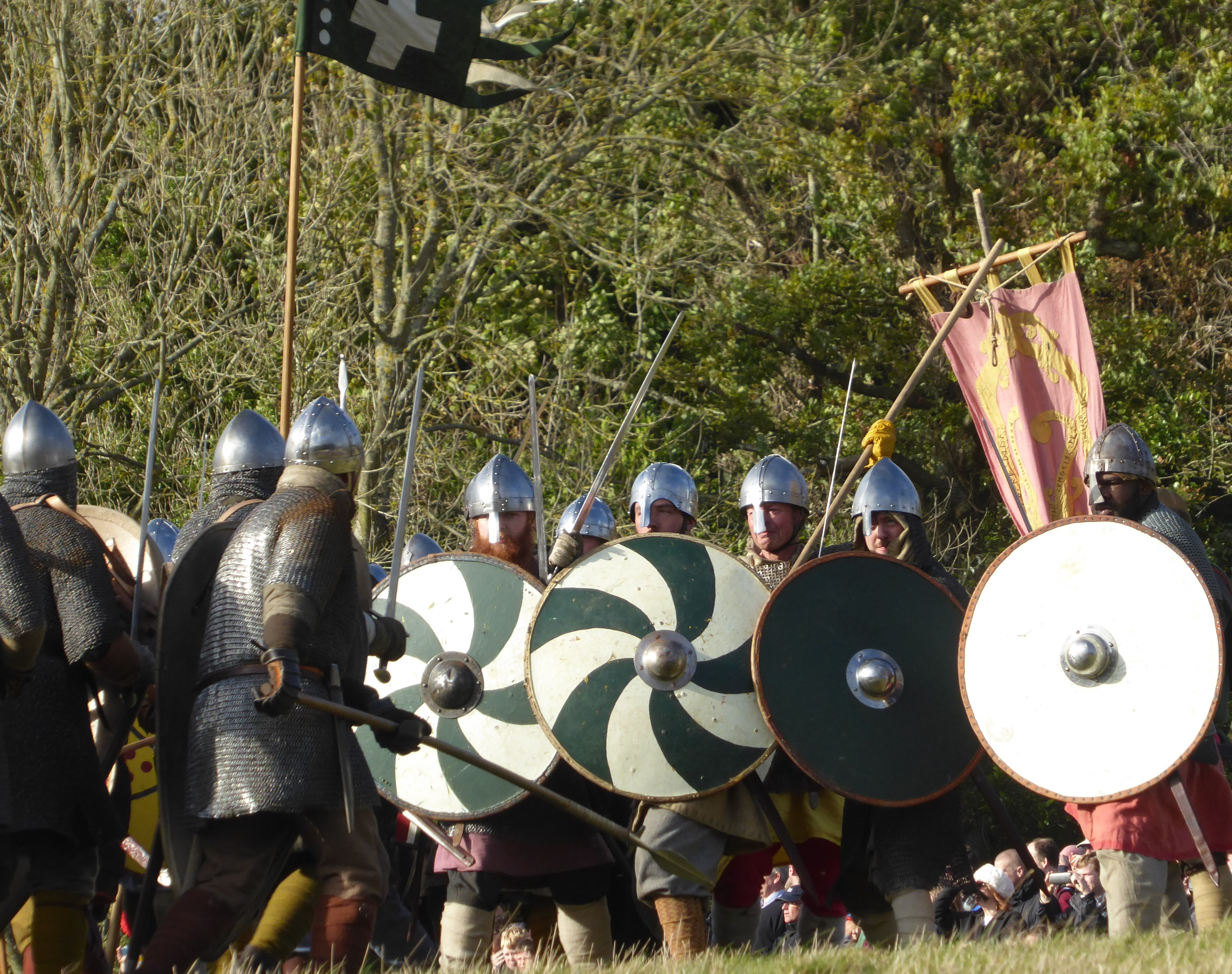
Regia Anglorum reenact the Battle of Hastings

Like most large reenactment groups, Regia Anglorum's activities include participation in local and national reenactment and reconstruction events such as the Battle of Hastings. A National Training Scheme exists to ensure authenticity and safety at these events.

Members of the society frequently appear as extras in film and television, and members have appeared in hundreds of separate works to date, from serious documentaries such as National Geographic's series about the Staffordshire Hoard, Michael Wood's "Beowulf", Blood of the Vikings, 1066: The Battle for Middle Earth and A History of Britain six separate appearances on Time Team, the children's programme Blue Peter on four occasions to adverts and music videos.

Regia Anglorum also has a team of horse riders, called The Radfolc.

== Infrastructure ==
The society funds its activities primarily through membership and events fees. It also provides facilities for school visits at many of its events. There are also teams and individuals who provide a school visitor service. Principally, their work mostly takes place in a Primary context under Key Stage 2 - "Invaders" but can also expand on the Battle of Hastings theme at the beginning of Key Stage 3.
