= Renaissance reenactment =

Historical reenactment

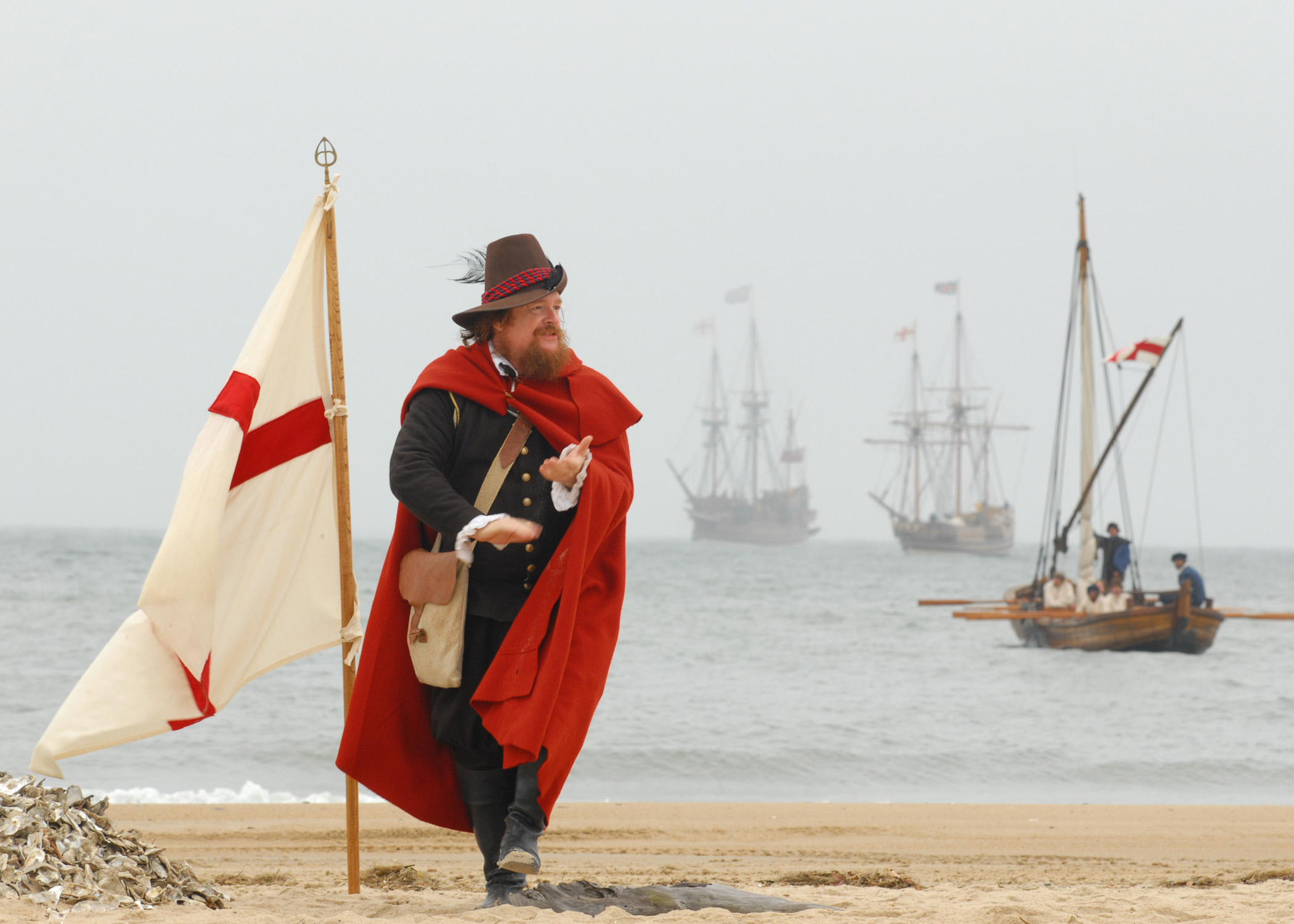
Reenactment of John Smith at Cape Henry, Virginia, on the 400th anniversary of the original landing.

Renaissance reenactment is historical reenactment of events of the Renaissance period and the European Age of Exploration. In its broadest use, it encompasses reenactment of periods from the early 15th century through the mid-18th century. Reenactments of earlier events are commonly termed medieval reenactment, while more recent events are modern reenactment. Events and periods within Renaissance reenactment vary by region and nation, but include the English Civil War in the United Kingdom, the Eighty Years' War in the Low Countries (particularly the Netherlands), L'Escalade in Switzerland, the Polish–Lithuanian Commonwealth in eastern Europe, and the early colonial period in the United States and Canada.

Renaissance fairs, a primarily American phenomenon, are, when historically based, considered part of Renaissance reenactment; however, some fairs favor entertainment over authenticity,

== See also ==
- The Sealed Knot (reenactment), English Civil War reenactors, the largest reenactment and historical society in the UK
- English Civil War Society, reenactors of the First and Second English Civil War
- Re-enactments in Kentwell Hall, re-enactment of the Tudor period
- List of Renaissance fairs
