= Company of the Wolf =

Australian living history group

- Founded: 2005
- Location: Australian, based in Australia
- Period: 1250–1490
- Speciality: Mercenary Campaigning
- Number of members: around 50
- Alliances: none

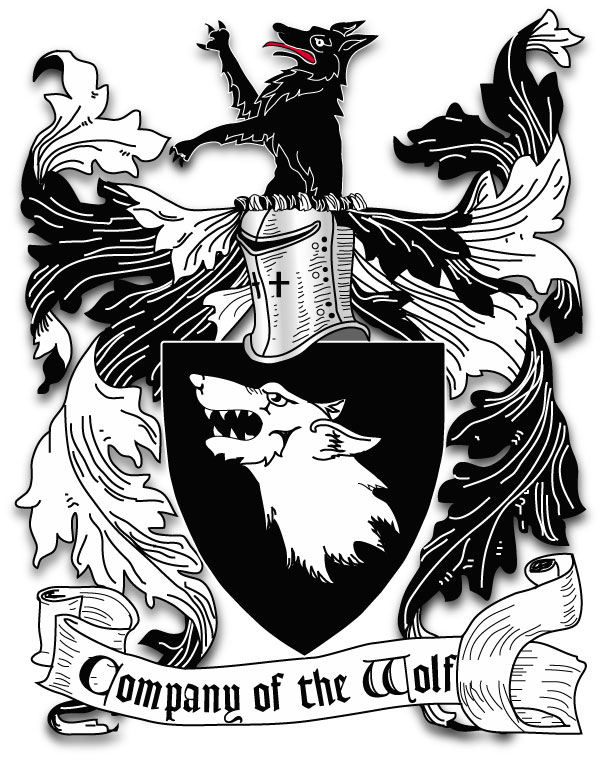
The full armorial achievement of the Company of the Wolf, - Sable a wolf's head erased Argent.

The Company of the Wolf is an Australian living history group focused on combat reenactment of European Middle-Ages warfare. The group takes the form of a mercenary company set during the great warring periods of the High Middle Ages and the Late Middle Ages.

Participating in themed events, the Company revives historic conflicts spanning over two centuries. Starting from about 1250 AD with the Seventh Crusade, through the Hundred Years' War, to the end of the Wars of the Roses and Bosworth Field in 1485. Members portray the varied characters that formed Western European mercenary groups of the era such as landless nobility, veteran professional campaigners, humble foot-soldiers and various camp followers.

== Aims ==
The group's charter states that its intent is twofold;

"To be an accessible reenactment group, catering to anyone with an interest in mediaeval European history, a suitable place in the group will be found for anyone with any level of experience or interest, and; To provide an accurate, interesting and fun educational experience to any institution or educational group interested in learning more about this interesting and largely misunderstood period of history. "

== Origins and history ==
The Company of the Wolf formed in 2005 to provide a vehicle for mediaeval historians and re-enactors living in and around the New England region of New South Wales. Traditionally, the Company has links to other groups in Australia, to reinforce the displays and shows of other groups. The Company is known for its mascot, Loupes De Guerre, or "war wolves". Historically, wolve, or other fierce breeds, would be unleashed before close quarters combat to break and demoralize enemy infantry formations. The Company of the Wolf uses the considerably friendlier Siberian Husky to represent these dogs of war, equipping them with historically accurate armour. While dogs are frequent attendants in historical re-enactment, Company of the Wolf claims to be the only reenactment group in Australia that fields a dedicated armoured war dog sub-unit.

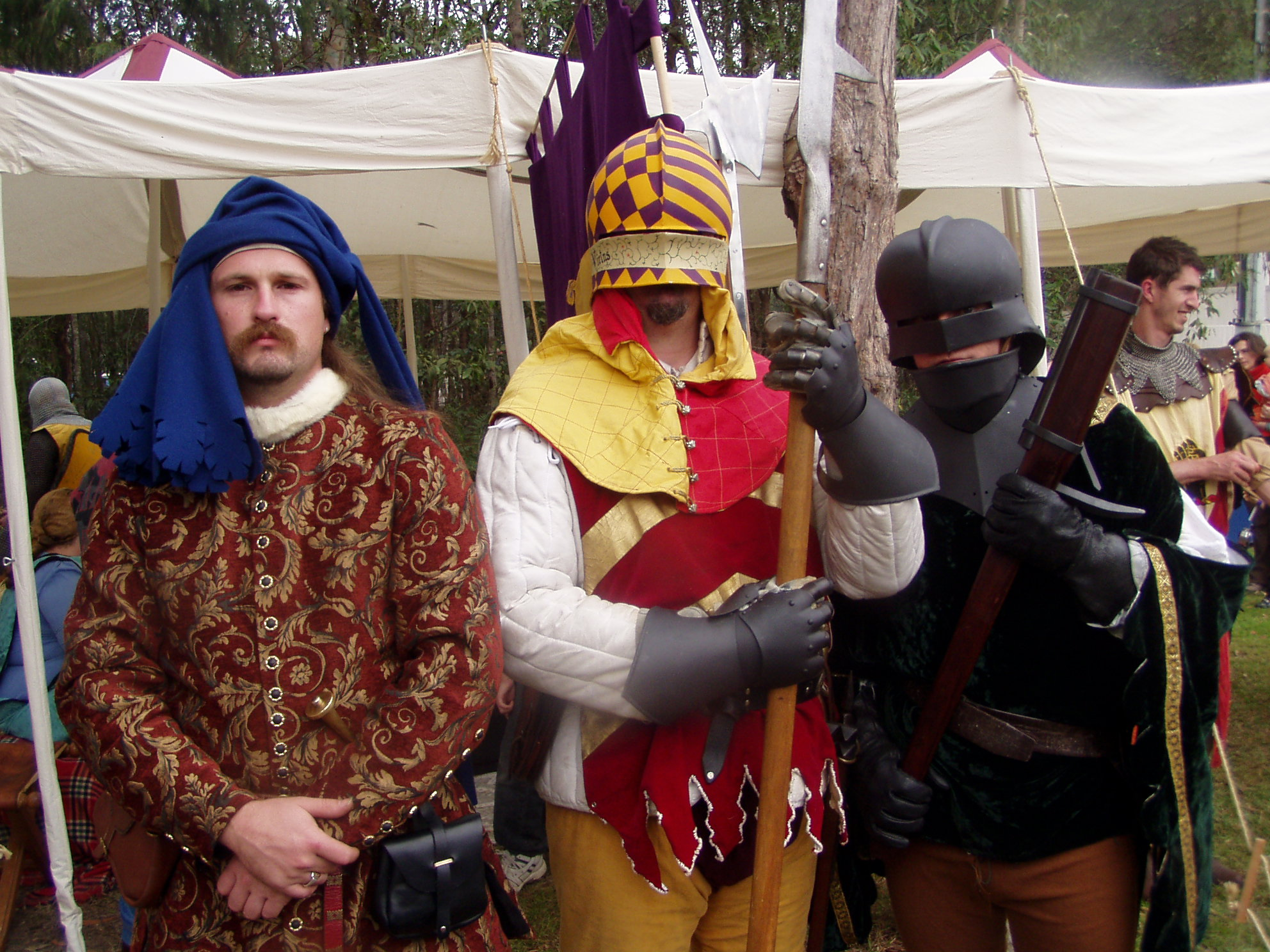
Members of the Company of the Wolf at the Abbey Mediaeval Tournament 2008, portraying examples from the 15th century, from left to right, Civilian dress, an armoured pikeman and an armoured handgunner

== Traditions and customs ==
The Company of the Wolf has a number of internal traditions and customs based on mediaeval practices.

=== Knighthood ===
Members of The Company of the Wolf who have attended three or more major events as members of the Company are awarded the rank of knight. This involves a traditional accolade or "dubbing" ceremony, where the newly elevated member is tapped on the shoulder with a sword and presented to his fellows, followed by a blow from a mailed fist. This represents the last blow that the new knight may ever take without responding to the challenge. The new knight is then presented with a small token of his or her new rank, often a badge. Once a knight, the member is referred to as "Sir" or "Lady", and has the right to wear spurs in the field to display his or her status to friends and foe alike. The knights of the Company of the Wolf are occasionally referred to collectively as "Knights of the Order of the Wolf". Unlike mediaeval orders of knighthood, both male and female members who are granted membership in the order are referred to as "knights", although their pre-nominal honorifics are gender specific.

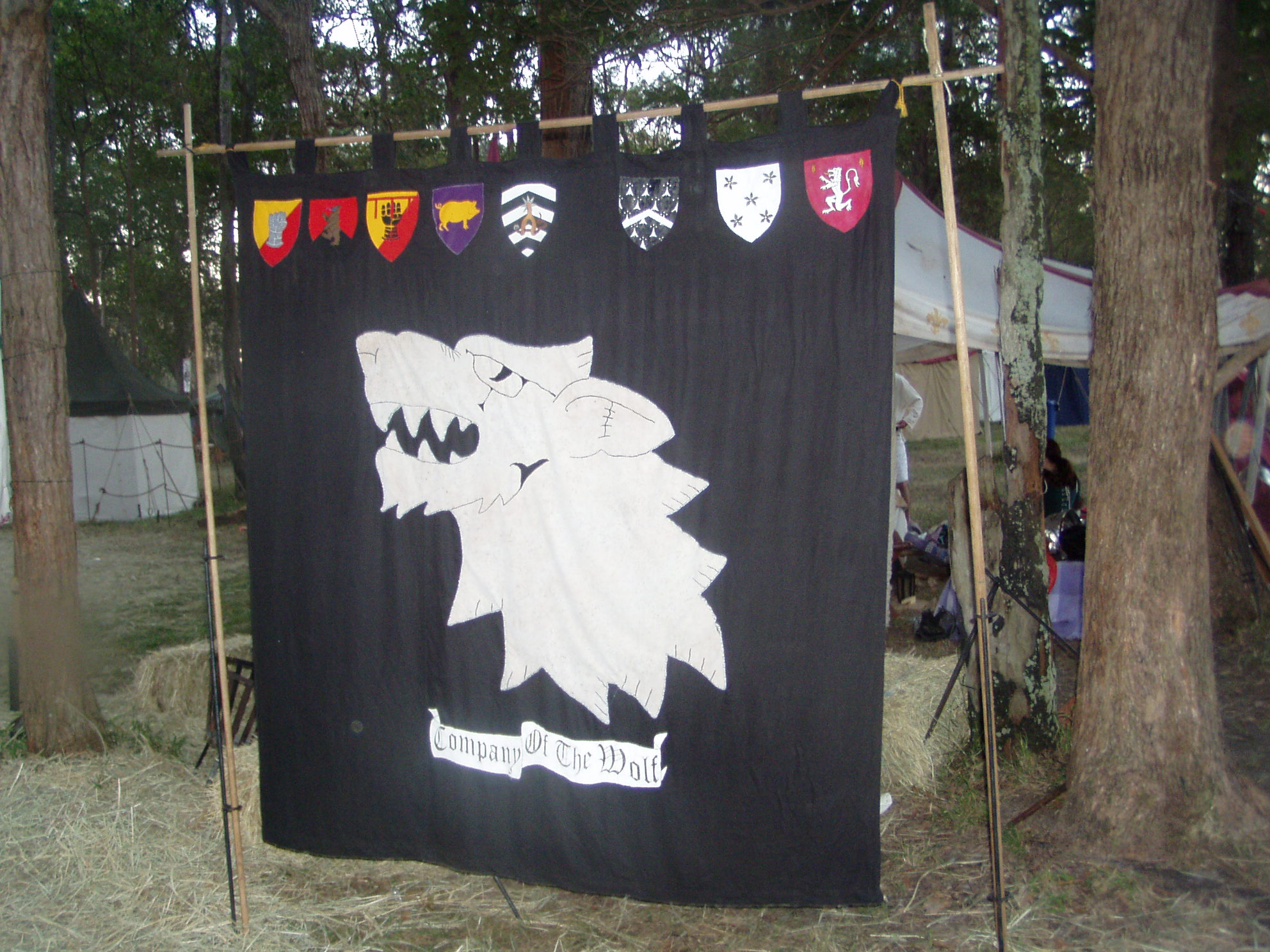
The Company of the Wolf banner, displaying the arms of the Company and the individual arms of the senior members of the Company

=== The Wolf Banner ===
When the Company of the Wolf deploys as a group, the Wolf banner is displayed. This is a large black banner displaying the arms of the Company. When static, this banner remains in the campsite signifying the Company is present and deployed as a unit. On parade or for combat displays, the banner can be carried by two bearers to announce that members of the Company have taken the field. When a member of the Company of the Wolf achieves the rank of knight, the armorial achievement of the member may be added to the banner in miniature. Children of knights, even when not knights themselves, are permitted to display their arms alongside their parents' with appropriate marks of cadency. As accessibility and inclusiveness are key components of the group's mission, children of members have always been encouraged to participate. When an existing member, male or female, becomes the parent of a new child, the baby is bestowed honorary membership until the age of 14, when they may decide for themselves if they wish to continue participation with the Company.

=== The Wolf's Tail Badge ===
Members of the Company of the Wolf will sometimes wear a "wolf's tail" hanging from their belts in both civilian and military attire as a form of group identification. As foxes are officially classed as vermin in Australia, members forgo the use of real wolves tails, and large fox tails are preferred. These "wolves' tails" are also sometimes hung from the poles of the Wolf Banner as a further embellishment of the Banner as the Company's rallying point.

== Events ==
The Company of the Wolf supplies displays, encampments and re-enactors to several high profile re-enactment events in Australia, including the Abbey Tournament at Caboolture in Queensland, and the Vikings! Exhibition at the Australian National Maritime Museum in Sydney. The Company also provides educational or "interest" displays for schools, universities or social groups when requested. Company members cover a range of mediaeval interests, and the group is structured in such a way as to allow the widest range of participation possible. This gives the Company of the Wolf a high degree of versatility, and allows the group to display and educate in civilian and military aspects of mediaeval life. The Company is lucky to count among its members and associates experts in a range of combat styles, mediaeval fashion and clothes making, armouring, heraldry and even mediaeval midwifery. Company of the Wolf is also notable for being one of the few mediaeval living history groups in Australia to field historically accurate black-powder weapons and crews. As well as public displays and shows, the Company of the Wolf also deploy privately to a number of immersive events for re-enactors along the East Coast of Australia.

== See also ==
- List of historical reenactment groups
- Society of Creative Anachronism, Australia
