= HMS Trincomalee =

19th-century British Royal Navy frigate

Coordinates: 54°41′25″N 1°12′24″W

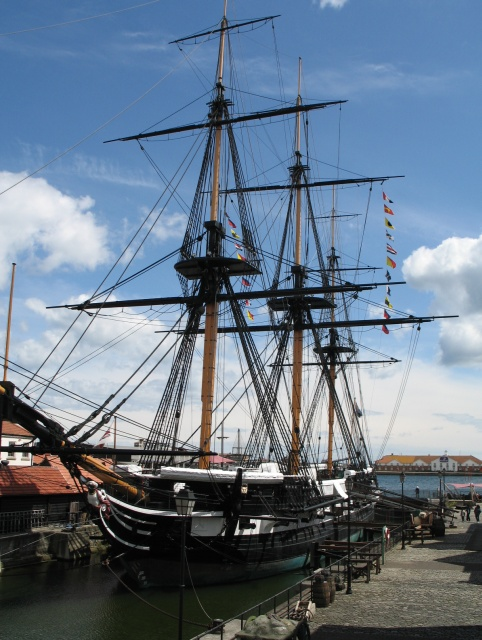
- Trincomalee in her current location in Hartlepool

History

United Kingdom
- Name: HMS Trincomalee
- Operator: National Museum of the Royal Navy
- Ordered: 30 October 1812
- Builder: Wadia Group
- Cost: £23,000
- Laid down: 25 April 1816
- Launched: 12 October 1817
- Out of service: 1986
- Renamed: Foudroyant: 1903; Trincomalee: 1992
- Home port: National Museum of the Royal Navy, Hartlepool, England
- Status: Museum ship

General characteristics
- Class & type: Leda-class frigate
- Tons burthen: 1065.63 bm
- Length: 150 ft 4.5 in (45.834 m) (gundeck); 125 ft 7.25 in (38.2842 m) (keel)
- Beam: 39 ft 11.25 in (12.1730 m)
- Depth of hold: 12 ft 9 in (3.89 m)
- Sail plan: Full-rigged ship
- Complement: 315 officers and men
- Armament: 38-guns: (classed as 46 as carronades were counted in armament from 1817); Gundeck: 28 × 18-pounders; Quarterdeck: 14 × 32-pounder carronades; Forecastle: 2 × 9-pounders; 2 × 32-pdr carronades

HMS Trincomalee is a Royal Navy Leda-class sailing frigate built shortly after the end of the Napoleonic Wars. She is now restored as a museum ship afloat in the National Museum of the Royal Navy, Hartlepool, England.

== History ==
=== 1812–1847 ===
Trincomalee is one of two surviving British frigates of her era—her near-sister HMS Unicorn (of the modified Leda class) is now a museum ship in Dundee. After being ordered on 30 October 1812, Trincomalee was built in Bombay, India, by the Wadia family of shipwrights in teak, due to oak shortages in Britain as a result of shipbuilding drives for the Napoleonic Wars. The ship was named Trincomalee after the 1782 Battle of Trincomalee off the Ceylon (Sri Lanka) port of that name.

Work on the Trincomalee began in May 1816. Ceremonially an engraved silver nail was hammered into the ship's keel by the master shipbuilder Jamsetjee Bomanjee Wadia, this being considered vital for the ship's well-being, according to Parsi Zoroastrian tradition. With a construction cost of £23,000 (approximately £2,015,000 in 2020), Trincomalee was launched on 12 October 1817. Commander Philip Henry Bridges sailed her to Portsmouth Dockyard, where she arrived on 30 April 1819, with a journey costing £6,600. During the maiden voyage the ship arrived at Saint Helena on 24 January 1819, where she stayed for 6 days, leaving with an additional passenger, a surgeon who had attended Napoleon at Longwood House on the island, Mr John Stokoe.

After being fitted out at a further cost of £2,400, Trincomalee was placed in reserve until 1845, when she was re-armed with fewer guns giving greater firepower, had her stern reshaped and was reclassified as a sixth-rate spar-decked corvette.

=== 1847–1895 ===
Trincomalee departed from Portsmouth in 1847 and remained in service for ten years, serving on the North America and West Indies Station. During her time, she was to help quell riots in Haiti, stop a threatened invasion of Cuba, and serve on anti-slavery patrol. In 1849, she was despatched to Newfoundland and Labrador before being recalled to Britain in 1850. In 1852 she sailed to join the Pacific Squadron on the west coast of America, and upon returning to England in 1857, she was put back 'in ordinary' after arriving at Chatham on 4 September.

In 1860 Trincomalee was fitted out and then in January 1861 towed to Sunderland to become tender to the drill ship HMS Castor (1832), whose role was to train Naval Volunteers boys aged 15 to 16 years being signed up to serve for 10 years on reaching the age of 18 years. During this time Trincomalee's gunports were again modified several times to accommodate different types of training armament. Then in 1862 she was moved to West Hartlepool, then the third largest port in Britain, and moored in the Union Dock to become an independent drill ship.

=== TS Foudroyant ===
Trincomalee finished her Royal Navy service as a training ship, but was placed in reserve again in 1895 and sold for scrap two years later on 19 May 1897. She was then purchased by entrepreneur Geoffry Wheatly Cobb, restored, and renamed Foudroyant in honour of HMS Foudroyant, his earlier ship that had been wrecked in 1897.

She was used in conjunction with HMS Implacable as an accommodation ship, a training ship, and a holiday ship first based in Falmouth and then Milford Haven. The relocation caused great dismay in Falmouth. She was based in Portsmouth Harbour in 1954.

She remained in service until 1986, after which she was again restored and renamed back to Trincomalee in 1992.

=== Later years ===
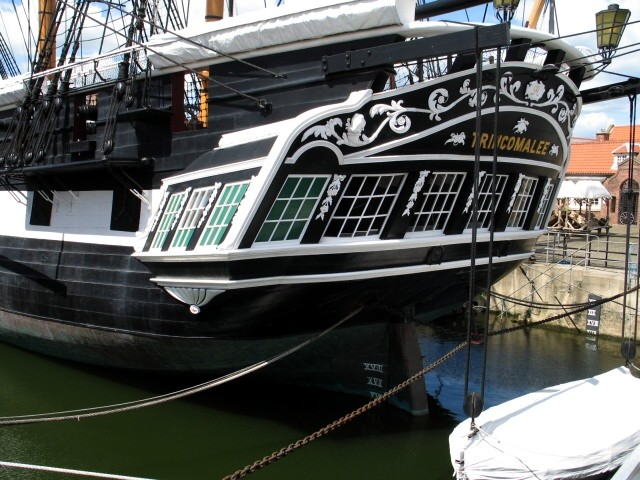
HMS Trincomalee, stern quarter

Now listed as part of the National Historic Fleet, following her recent restoration Trincomalee has become the centrepiece of the National Museum of the Royal Navy based in Hartlepool.

Trincomalee holds the distinction of being the oldest British warship still afloat as HMS Victory, although 52 years her senior, is in dry dock.

Until his death in 1929, the Falmouth-based painter Henry Scott Tuke used the ship and its trainees as subject matter.

== Figurehead ==
The figurehead of HMS Trincomalee was carved by Hellyer & Sons from pine; a suitable wood for figurehead carving owed to its softness, straight grain which enables consistency of working and its lightweight. Yellow pine was often favoured by the Royal Navy for its strength, durability and stability.

It depicts a turbaned man, believed to represent a Sri Lankan, where Trincomalee is a port. The British used Trincomalee as an anchorage for Royal Navy ships in the Indian Ocean, following their permanent occupation of Trincomalee in 1795 after their success during the Battle of Trincomalee. The dockyard was established by the British as a naval dockyard, and was home to the East Indies Station during World War II.

The original design, drawing and correspondence regarding the creation of the figurehead survive within the collection of The National Archives in London. This design of a turbaned man was commonly used for figureheads of ships built in India, which were often named after regions of the subcontinent, such as HMS Carnatic (1823) (Karnataka), HMS Calcutta (1831) and HMS Seringapatam (1819) (Srirangapatna).

The figurehead itself was carved in Britain, rather than alongside the ship in Bombay (modern day Mumbai). This was not uncommon, with prominent carving families such as the Hellyers petitioning the Naval Board for the contracts to carve for ships being built within the British Empire. The ship would then have the figurehead attached when it reached its port of creation.

The figurehead was conserved by Orbis Conservation in 2020, revealing historical restoration and paint work. Earliest paint samples revealed reds, greens and gold used later that matched a cigarette card issued in 1931, suggesting this scheme was followed by a previous restorer.

== Gallery ==
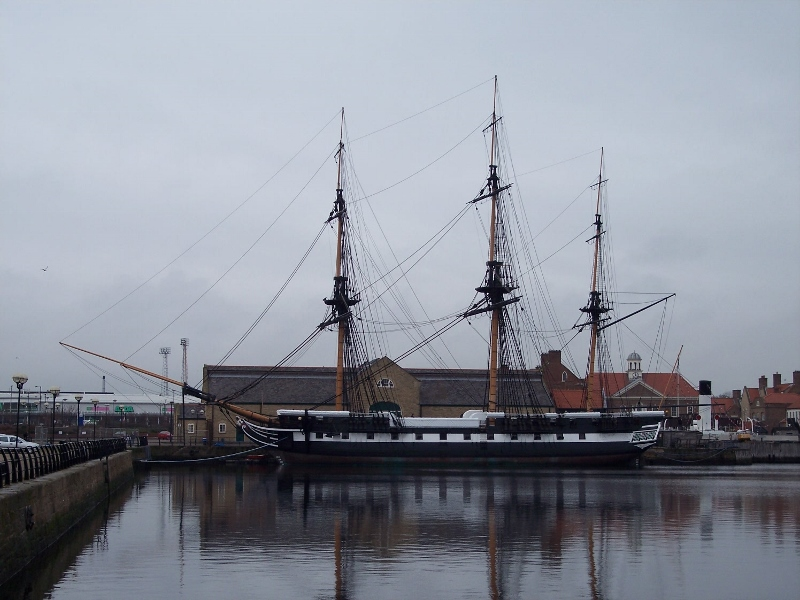

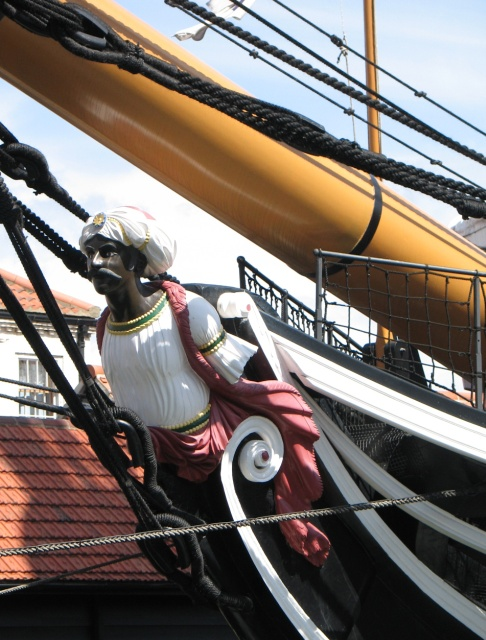

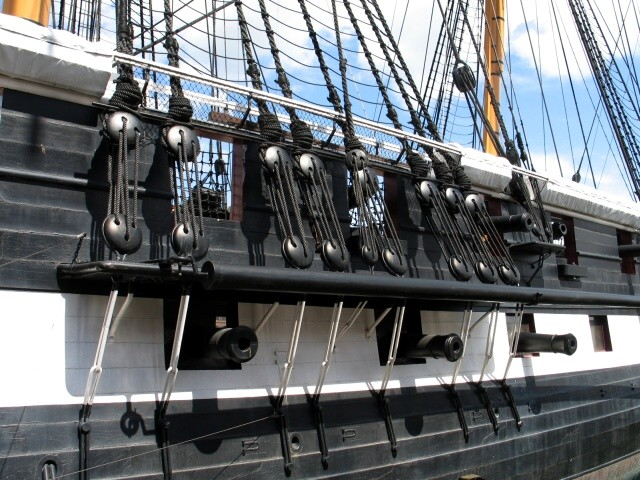

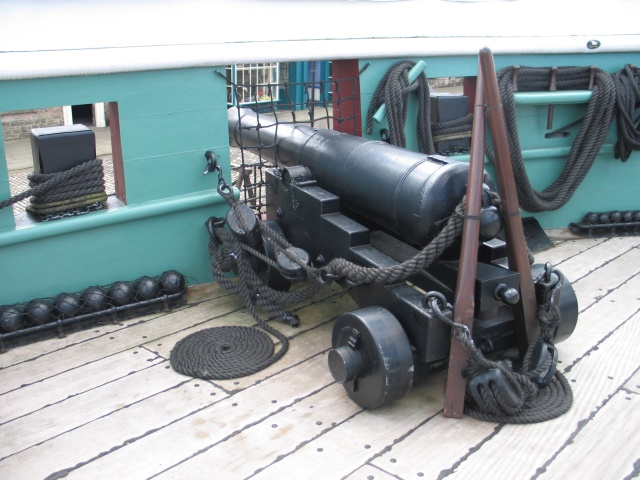

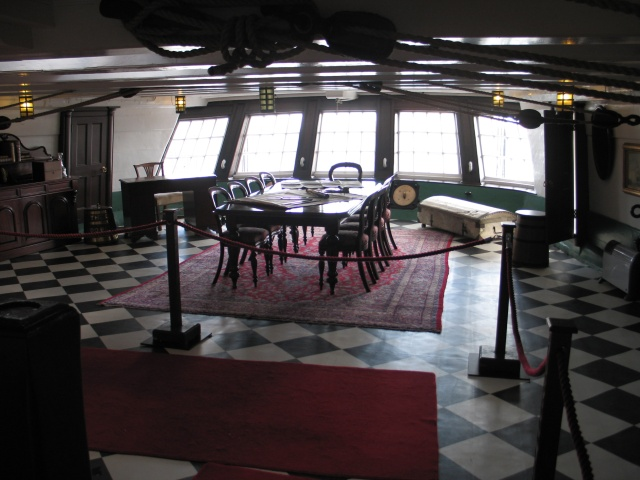

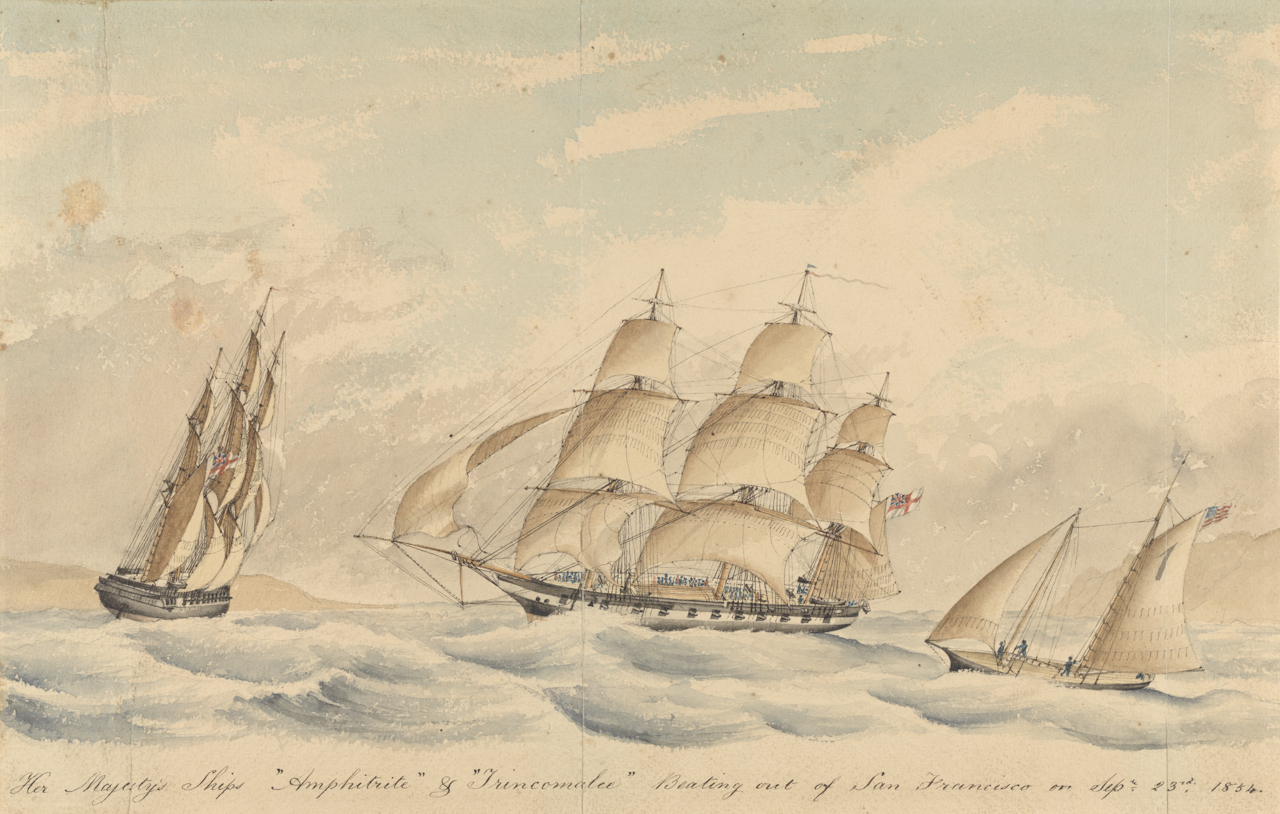
Trincomalee beating out of San Francisco on 23 Sept 1854

== See also ==
- HMS Victory – 18th-century first rate ship of the line
- USS Constitution – 18th-century US Navy frigate
- HMS Unicorn – a surviving sister ship
- Historical Maritime Society
