= Historical Maritime Society =

British naval reenactment society

The Historical Maritime Society
- Founded: 1995
- Location: Lancashire, England
- Period: Modern
- Earliest year portrayed: 1805
- Latest year portrayed: 1945
- Umbrella group(s): European Napoleonic Society
- Website: hms.org.uk

The Historical Maritime Society (HMS) is a United Kingdom-based historical reenactment organisation researching and portraying life in Horatio Nelson, 1st Viscount Nelson's Royal Navy. There is also a growing interest within the Society in all matters naval and in other periods – including the Second World War

== History ==
The society was established in 1996 by members of The English Civil War Society who were also interested in Napoleonic naval history. The first reenactment event was a living history at the Hartlepool Historic Quay.

== Events ==
The society aims to entertain and inform and is linked to educational sites. It has performed reenactment events of the Napoleonic period aboard HMS Victory at the Royal Naval Dockyard at Portsmouth, HMS Trincomalee, which is permanently moored at the historic quay at Hartlepool, the National Maritime Museum, and many more locations in the UK. The society has also taken part in international reenactment events including Malta.

== Appearances in the media ==
HMS appeared in the Channel 4 series The Worst Jobs in History (2004), describing life in the Georgian Royal Navy. The filming took place aboard HMS Trincomalee, UK. The society featured in Paul Lewis Isemonger's book Wellington's War. about the Napoleonic period and provided accurate portrayals of life aboard one of the Royal Navy's frigates during the Napoleonic Wars

== Projects ==
HMS recently constructed its own replica 'cutter' or launch which can be equipped with its own, fully operational replica carronade. and a swivel gun. A recent article in Skirmish Living History Magazine recounts the history of this project complete with pictures of HMS in action

The Cutter is a working boat, designed for transport (including a company of Royal Marines), transfer of crews, provisions - including beer and water barrels. One of the crucial uses for such a vessel was that of 'kedging' where a kedge anchor would be rowed ahead, dropped and for the ship to be then drawn - or warped - ahead by winding the capstan. This would be necessary for hauling off sandbanks or shoals, to escape a lee position and for tight manoeuvering when entering harbours at the heads of river estuaries or tight anchorages.

Work to up-rate the 12-oar launch to a gaff rig sailing launch, or cutter, is now complete. This has equipped the society with a vessel comparable to that in which the then lieutenant William Bligh and the loyal non-mutineers from HMS Bounty were cast away on 29 April 1789.

HMS is currently building a replica Mk 8 'Cockle' canoe, reflecting the Society's interest in aspects of WW2 activity. There are a few other extant examples of the marques of the family of canoes that followed on from those used in Operation Frankton - immortalised in the film The Cockleshell Heroes - including those owned and on loan to the Falmouth Maritime Museum (these are the aluminium versions) but the wooden versions are long gone. There is a dedicated site showing current state of construction.

All of the work on the uniforms, kit and the launch itself - including the rig - has been undertaken by members of the society and has been funded entirely by the membership.
