= Nares (disambiguation) =

Nares is the plural of naris, meaning nostril.

Nares may also refer to:

== Anatomy and medicine ==
- Anterior nares, the external or frontal part of the nasal cavity
- NARES, acronym for Non-allergic Rhinitis with Eosinophilia Syndrome

== Places ==
- Nares River, a river in the Yukon and British Columbia, Canada
- Nares Land, Greenland
- Nares Rocks, Tasmania, Australia
- County of Nares, Queensland, Australia
- Mount Nares, Antarctica

== Other uses ==
- National Association of Re-enactment Societies (NAReS), United Kingdom

== People with the surname ==
- Edward Nares, English historian
- Eric Paytherus Nares, major general, commander of British troops in Berlin 1945–1947
- Geoffrey Nares, English stage actor
- George Nares, English explorer and naval officer
- George Nares (judge), English judge
- James Nares (artist), British-American artist
- James Nares (composer), English composer
- Owen Nares, English stage and film actor
- Robert Nares, English writer

== See also ==
- Naresh, an Indian male given name
  - Naresh (actor), an Indian actor
