= Vikings of Middle England =

Historical re-enactment group in Leicester, England

- Founded: 1991; 35 years ago
- Purpose: Historical reenactment, Viking reenactment, living history
- Location: Leicester, United Kingdom
- Region served: United Kingdom
- Members: 60–100
- Website: vikingsof.me

Vikings of Middle England (also known as Tÿrslið) is a Viking re-enactment and living history group based in Leicester, UK. They portray through historical costume and activities the people who lived, travelled to, and invaded Britain in the Viking-Age. Tÿrslið aims to entertain and educate its audience through a mix of drama, pageantry, special effects, historical context, demonstrations, and audience participation. Tÿrslið are one of the few groups to display Icelandic Horses in a Viking-Age presentation, with horses and riders from Oakfield Icelandic Horses joining them at events. As well as arena displays, Vikings of Middle England erect a Living History encampment where members demonstrate Viking-age crafts such as blacksmithing or where the audience can have a go at certain activities such as coin-striking. The organisation once owned a scale replica Longship called Ratatosk.

Vikings of Middle England perform at events throughout the UK, including at places of historical interest such as Rockingham Castle, carnivals, festivals and local events, and also at other visitor attractions such as Conkers. Vikings of Middle England also provide displays and resources for education, at schools and for seminars. The organisation has lent expertise and kit to researchers for books, websites, TV and film productions, and conferences while also publishing articles on their website suitable for UK Key Stage 2 pupils.

Vikings of Middle England's membership is mostly based in the city of Leicester. However, some members hail from the surrounding East Midlands and further afield. A number of other Viking re-enactment groups have been started by former members.

== Notable Members, Achievements and Performances ==
- Members performed in vignettes for the TV show Viking Warrior Women (Wild Blue Media for National Geographic, 2019)
- Members appeared on the TV gameshow The Crystal Maze in 2018
- The group is featured heavily in 'Dkfindout! Vikings' Published in 2018, showing a wide range of reproduction artefacts, costumes and tools.
- Member and Blacksmith Jason Green, and member Alan Ball appeared in the BBC's 'From Ice to Fire: The Incredible Science of Temperature' Episode 3 'Playing with Fire' (2018). Jason explained the heating and cooling processes of historical ironworking while dressed in Viking Age clothing and using Viking-Age replica tool (the same set that appears in the aforementioned DKFindout! Vikings book).
- Members of the group appeared in the British Museum's Vikings Live cinema broadcast in 2014 to launch the Vikings: Life and Legend exhibition.
- Member Peter Holyoake starred in the Kerry Food's 'Walls! Bring It On Britain!' advertising campaign in 2010. Footage from the groups re-enactment at Hemsby Viking Festival 2010 is used in the ad.
- Dr. Gareth Williams, Curator of Early Medieval Coins at the British Museum is a former member, and notes his experience in online articles and his published work.
- The author Tim Moore spent time with Vikings of Middle England who were a subject for his book I Believe in Yesterday.
- Performed in BBC's 'Blood of the Vikings' mini series (2001).
- Performed in 'Weapons that Made Britain' Episode 4 Shield (Lion TV for Channel 4, 2004).
- Performed in 'Warrior Queen — Boudica' (Indigo Films for History Channel, 2005).
- Performed in the music video for 'Assessment' by the Beta Band.
- Performed in 'Faintheart' (Vertigo Films, 2008), a feature film about a Viking Re-enactor. The film was the result of a competition by MySpace (along with Film4 and Vertigo Films), where the director Vito Rocco won, with the help of the group in his pitch video 'Votes for Vito'.
- Performed in 'Born of Hope' (Actors at Work Production, 2009).
- Vikings of Middle England are one of eight groups mentioned in Writing History 7-11: Historical writing in different genres for children to understand what is meant by reconstruction, an activity for the National Curriculum for History (DfE 2013).

=== Reviews ===
- Spectator Damien Brook described an event at Tutbury Castle in May 2004, saying 'Once again, Vikings of Middle England had demonstrated their professionalism and their ability to educate, entertain and thrill a crowd of two to three thousand people with yet another quality performance of frighteningly realistic combat and evocative drama. Their reputation can only be enhanced by this performance. This was staggeringly good entertainment.'
- Jonathon Davies summarising in Skirmish Magazine in 2010 said 'A number of points impressed me over the weekend. The first is how privileged we are to have and to work at such a beautiful site, and with a public that was both numerous and highly appreciative. Next is the variety of presentation styles represented by the different groups, which complemented each other over the weekend. There were the fighting groups that put on a tremendous show for the public in the arena, there were the re-enactors who acted with enthusiasm and wit and then there were the specialists; highly knowledge-able about the period and with the ability to communicate their passion and understanding.'
- The group was reviewed and included in the 'Top Ten Re-Enactments for Family' by BBC CountryFile Magazine.

== See also ==
- List of historical reenactment groups
