= List of historical reenactment groups =

This is a list of notable historical reenactment groups.

Name	Real world location	Period	Earliest year portrayed	Latest year portrayed	Speciality
Company of Saynt George	Switzerland, France, UK, Sweden, Austria, Italy, Netherlands, Belgium, Denmark, Poland, Czech Republic, Germany	Middle Ages	1470 AD	1480 AD	Living history, artillery, black powder
Company of the Wolf	Australia	Middle Ages	1250 AD	1490 AD	Combat reenactment, living history
The English Civil War Society	UK	English Civil War	1642 AD	1651 AD	Combat reenactment, living history, educational visits, film and TV work
Ermine Street Guard	UK	Roman army	50 AD	200 AD	Combat reenactment, living history, TV and film work, education work, research
Historia Normannis	UK France USA	Middle Ages	1100	1215	Combat reenactment, living history
Historical Maritime Society	UK	Modern	1805 AD	1945 AD	Combat reenactment, living history, naval
The Medieval Siege Society	UK	War of the Roses	1350 AD	1490 AD	Combat reenactment, living history, artillery, black powder
Nova Roma	US, Canada, Mexico, Brazil, Argentina, Italy, France, Spain, Portugal, UK, Germany, Hungary, Romania, Finland, Sweden, and Australia	Ancient Rome	753 BCE	394 CE	Education, Roman religion, living history
Regia Anglorum	UK, US, Canada	Early Middle Ages	850 AD	1100 AD	Combat reenactment, living history, educational visits, film and TV work
The Sealed Knot	UK, (links with Germany and Czech Republic)	English Civil War, Monmouth Rebellion	1642 AD	1685 AD	Combat reenactment, living history, educational visits, film and TV work
Society for Creative Anachronism	US, Canada, Australia, New Zealand, Europe, Israel, South Africa, Japan, South Korea, Thailand	Early Middle Ages to Early Renaissance	None (official); 600 AD (unofficial)	1600 AD	Combat re-enactment, period arts and sciences, living history
The Vikings	UK, US, Canada, Netherlands, Ireland, Italy	Vikings	793 AD	1066 AD	Combat reenactment, living history, educational visits, film and TV work
Vikings of Middle England	UK	Vikings	793 AD	1066 AD	Combat reenactment, living history, educational visits, film and TV work
