= The Sealed Knot (reenactment) =

British historical association and charity

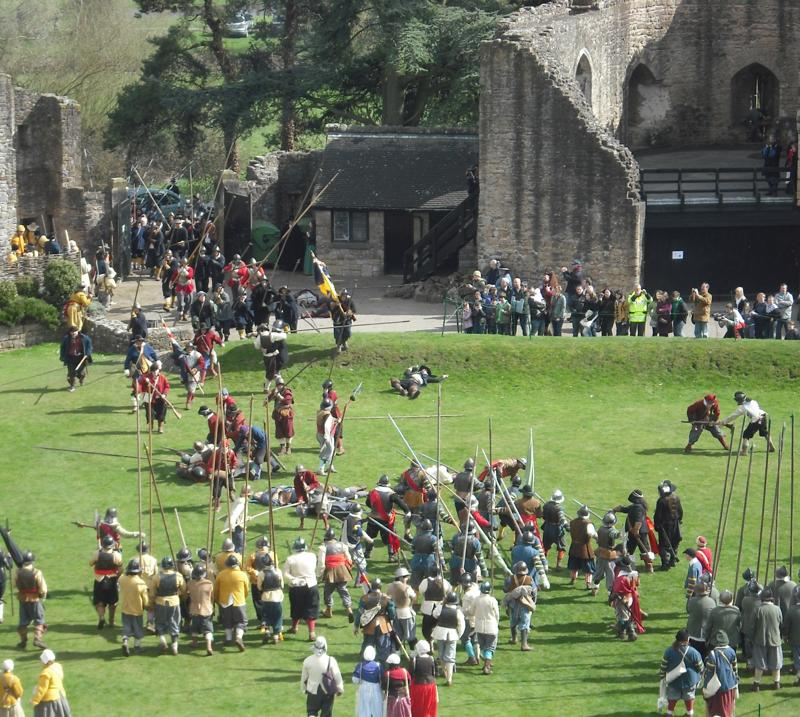
Reenactment of an assault by Parliamentarian forces upon Caldicot Castle

The Sealed Knot is a British historical association and charity, with many members from outside the United Kingdom, dedicated to costumed reenactment of battles and events surrounding the English Civil War.

== About ==
The Sealed Knot takes its name from the original Sealed Knot, a secret association aimed at the restoration of the monarchy, although the modern incarnation has none of the political affiliations of its namesake. Apart from reenactment, it is also involved in research into the history of the Civil War, and education (at the school or college level) about the same.

== History ==
The Sealed Knot was founded by Brigadier Peter Young, who was a military historian and a Second World War veteran. The idea of the Sealed Knot re-enactment group started at a dinner party with a small group of friends on 28 February 1968 following the publication of "Edgehill 1642 – the Campaign and the Battle". Within a few months it had 200 members and today has a membership of several thousand, making it the largest re-enactment society in Europe. The group is a registered charity, and has its own coat of arms.

With its large membership and high profile the Sealed Knot is the largest and best known of all the many re-enactment and historical groups and societies in the UK. Its official journal, Orders of the Day, is published every three months and sent to all members. It contains information about forthcoming events.

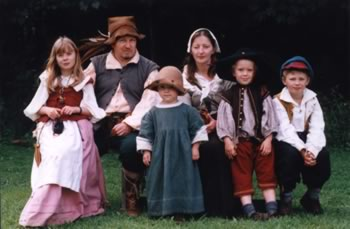
Sealed Knot Members in the gardens of Bank Hall in Bretherton, re-enactment of the Civil War in 2008.

The Sealed Knot comprises a number of regiments split into Parliamentarian, Royalist and Scots armies. The group was responsible for the first commemoration in 1971 of the Battle of Nantwich (which took place in 1644) and in 1973 the Sealed Knot staged the first re-enactment of the battle, which has now become an annual event at the end of January and is known as "Holly Holy Day".

== Regiments ==
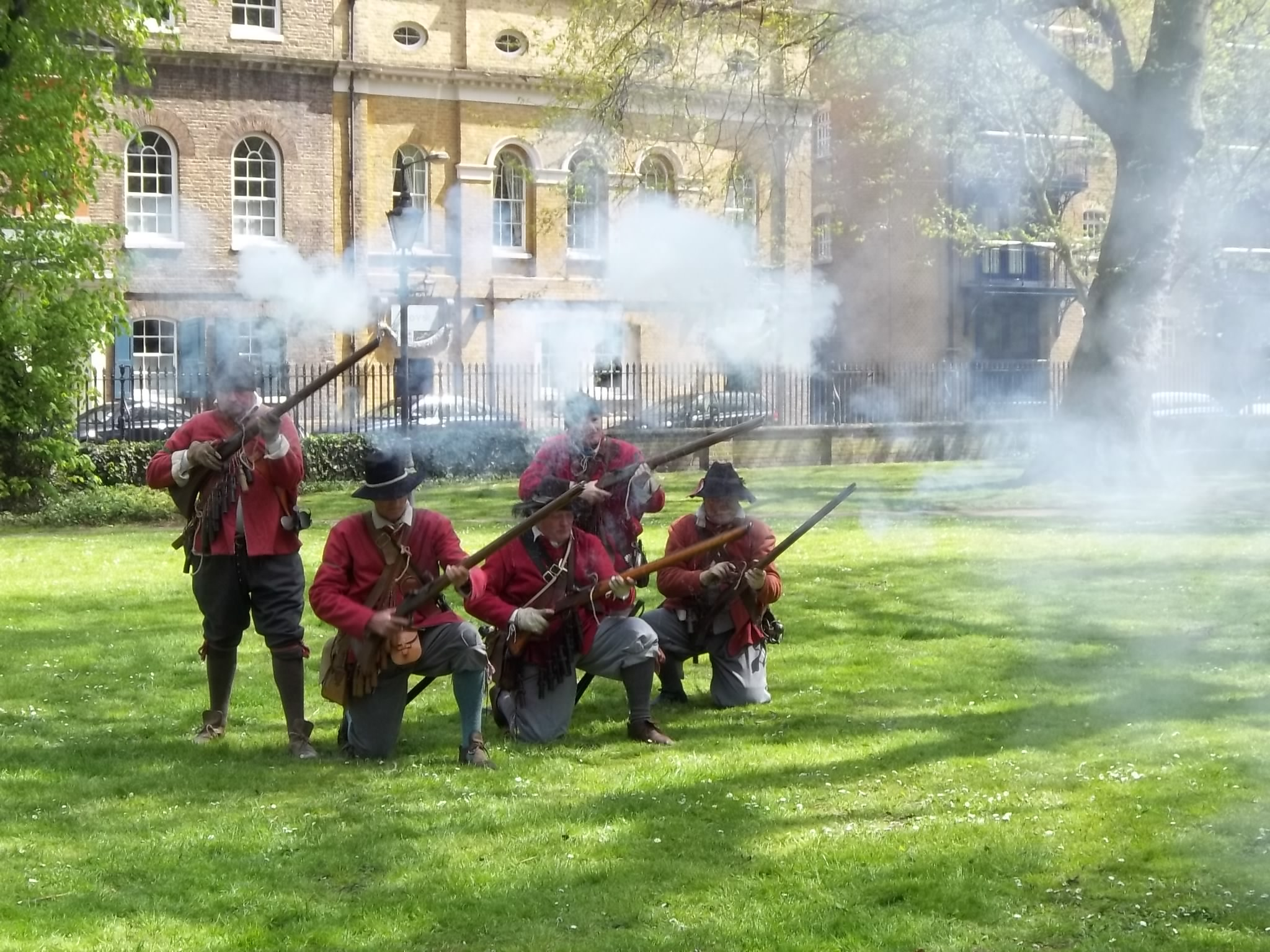
Thomas Rainsborough Company of the Sealed Knot firing in salute, Wapping 2013

The Sealed Knot is made up of smaller groups, each run semi-autonomously, and known to their members as "regiments", their names and identities closely linked to regiments that took part in the English Civil War. Each of these regiments falls under one of the armies of the society: the Royalist Army, the Army of Parliament and the Army of Ireland and Scotland. The other sections are those who deal with pyrotechnics, the medical service, the living history group and Friends of the Knot. There are two different types of regiment – "foote" are infantry with pikemen and musketeers, while "horse" are regiments of cavalry. The Thomas Rainsborough Company took part in the opening ceremony for a plaque commemorating the burial of Thomas Rainsborough in Wapping on 12 May 2013.

Parliament The Army of Parliament is divided into four Brigades, each made up of regiments, bands and dragoones. In addition there are three units that report directly to the Lord General: Sir William Waller’s Lifeguard of Horse, Okey’s Dragoons, and the trayne of Artillery. The Lord General heads the Army. He is assisted by his Staff, who range from the Chief of Staff to humble runners. The following list shows the regiments in each brigade:

CITTIE OF LONDON BRIGADE: The Blew Regiment of the Cittie of London Trayned Bandes,
The Earl of Essex Hys Regiment of Foote,
Colonel Roberts Hammond's Regiment of Foote,
Colonel Samuel Jones' Regiment of Foote,
Tower Hamlets Trayned Bandes,
Sir Arthur Heselrigge's Independent company,
OLIVER CROMWELL'S: Colonel John Birch's Regiment of Foote,
Sergeant Major General Phillip Skippon's Regiment of Foote,
Colonel John Pickering’s Regiment of Foote,
Lieutenant Colonel John Lilburne's Regiment of Foote,
SIR THOMAS FAIRFAX'S: Sir John Gell’s Regiment of Foote,
Colonel John Hutchinson's Regiment of Foote,
Earl of Manchester's Regiment of Foote,
Lord Saye & Sele's Regiment of Foote,
SIR WILLIAM WALLER'S: Colonel Thomas Ballard’s Regiment of Foote,
Sergeant Major General James Carr’s Regiment of Foote,
Lord John Robarte’s Regiment of Foote,
Earl of Stamford's Regiment of Foote

== Parody ==
The Sealed Knot is parodied as "The Peeled Nuts" in the Discworld series of novels by Terry Pratchett. It has also been parodied in Chris Morris' On The Hour, where it is referred to as "The Soiled Nut". Half Man Half Biscuit's song "Uffington Wassail" on their 2000 album Trouble over Bridgwater challenges the Society to re-enact "Luton Town – Millwall, nineteen eighty-five", a notorious incident of football hooliganism involving rival supporters.

== See also ==
- List of historical reenactment groups
- English Civil War reenactment
- English Civil War Society
