= HMS Unicorn (1824) =

Leda-class sailing frigate

Coordinates: 56.46161°N 2.95851°W

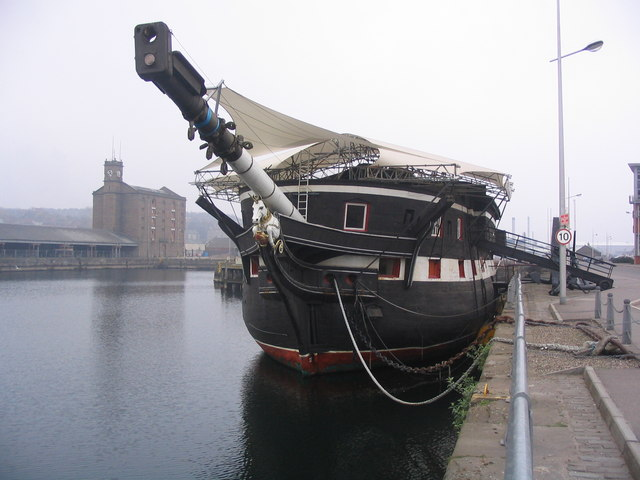

History

United Kingdom
- Name: HMS Unicorn
- Operator: Royal Navy
- Ordered: 23 July 1817
- Builder: Royal Dockyard, Chatham, Kent, England
- Laid down: February 1822
- Launched: 30 March 1824; 202 years ago
- In service: 1824
- Out of service: ~1964
- Refit: 1824, refit during construction to receiving/barracks vessel
- Home port: Dundee, Scotland
- Status: Museum ship, Dundee, Scotland

General characteristics
- Class & type: Modified Leda-class frigate
- Tons burthen: 1077 bm
- Length: 151 ft 9 in (46.25 m) (lower deck); 125 ft (38 m) (keel)
- Beam: 40 ft 3 in (12.27 m)
- Depth of hold: 12 ft 9 in (3.89 m)
- Sail plan: Although never given masts, she was planned as a full-rigged ship
- Range: Cannot move without tow (never rigged)
- Complement: 315
- Armament: Upper deck: 28 × 18-pounder guns; Quarter deck: 14 × 32-pounder carronades; Forecastle: 2 × 9-pounder guns, 2 × 32-pounder carronades

HMS Unicorn is a surviving sailing frigate of the successful Leda class, although the original design had been modified by the time that the Unicorn was built, to incorporate a circular stern and "small-timber" system of construction. Listed as part of the National Historic Fleet, Unicorn is now a museum ship in Dundee, Scotland, United Kingdom. She is the oldest ship in Scotland, one of the oldest ships in the world, and one of the last intact warships from the age of sail. As of January 2025, the ship is due to undergo restoration and relocation to a newly restored dry dock (Dundee's East Graving Dock).

== History ==
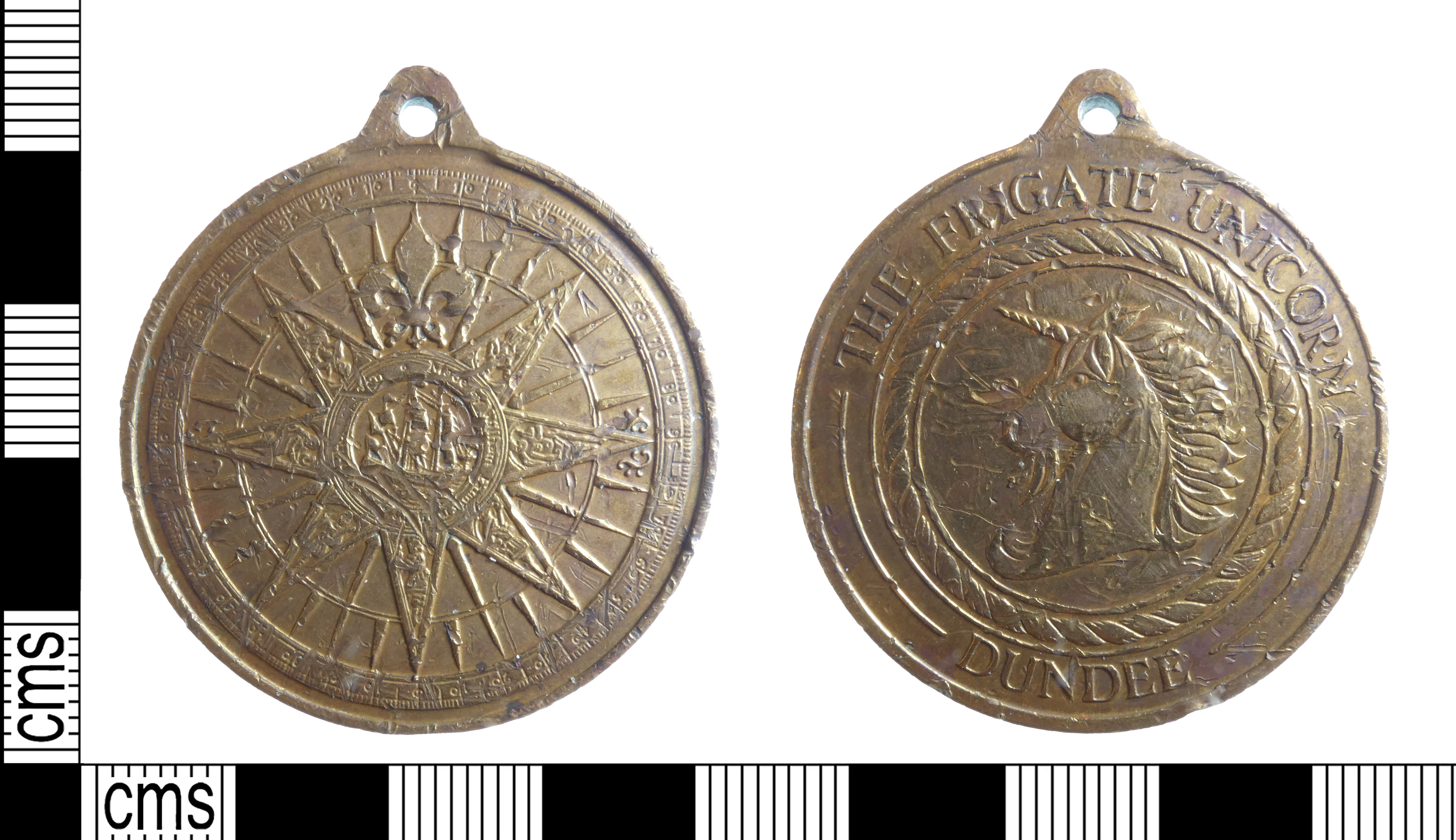
Modern medallion commemorating HMS Unicorn

HMS Unicorn was built in peacetime at Chatham Dockyard, Kent and launched in 1824. This was a transitional period for shipbuilding, as suitable timber was becoming more difficult to obtain, and iron was increasingly available. Under the direction of Sir Robert Seppings, then Surveyor of the Royal Navy, Unicorn was built with diagonal riders made with iron straps and iron "knees" that strengthened the hull.

As Unicorn was built shortly after the naval wars against Napoleon ended, she was never rigged; a superstructure was built over her main deck and she was laid up "in ordinary", serving as a hulk and a depot ship for most of the next 140 years. In 1857, she was loaned to the War Department for use as a floating gunpowder store at the Royal Arsenal at Woolwich, returning to her original berth at Sheerness in 1863. Her lack of sea service meant that her hull remained in good condition and in 1873 was selected to be a drill ship for the Royal Naval Reserve at Dundee to replace HMS Brilliant (1814). Unicorn was towed on her only sea voyage by the steam sloop, HMS Salamander.

In 1906 Unicorn was transferred to the Royal Naval Volunteer Reserve, and in both World Wars she was the Area Headquarters of the Senior Naval Officer, Dundee. In 1939 a new aircraft carrier was named HMS Unicorn (I72) and the old frigate became HMS Unicorn II, but in 1941 was renamed HMS Cressy to avoid confusion. During the Second World War she also acted as training centre for the Women's Royal Naval Service and more than 1,500 women trained there. On 14 May 1945, Unicorn accepted the surrender of German submarine U-2326.

In 1959, after the aircraft carrier had been scrapped, Cressy recovered her original name. In 1962, Unicorn's original berth in the Earl Grey Dock was filled-in for the new Tay Road Bridge and she was moved downstream accordingly, surviving a proposal to have her scrapped after the intervention of her former captain. In 1967, a new shore establishment for the Tay Division reservists was opened, and the ship's future was again brought into question, resulting in the creation of the Unicorn Preservation Society, led by Lord Dalhousie. Prince Philip, Duke of Edinburgh accepted Unicorn on behalf of the society on 26 September 1968.

Her lack of active duty left her timbers well preserved, and in the late 1960s steps were initiated to convert her to a museum ship. The roof that covers her upper deck is thought to be original, although portions of it were removed in the 1970s, leading conservators to replace the foc'sle roof.

In April 2019 the Unicorn Preservation Society, whose patron is Anne, Princess Royal, received a National Lottery Resilient Heritage Fund Grant in the amount of £28,900.

=== 21st century ===
In March 2021 the frigate was surveyed; most of the planking was found to be in a very poor state, with even newer planking (from the 1850s) also deteriorated. However, according to one of the restorers, of all the old ships of this type, "this one is probably the most original, certainly inside ... Virtually all of what you see dates back to the day it was built and it hasn't been largely rebuilt over that time."

It was planned to move the ship to the nearby East Graving Dock for conservation work (Operation Safe Haven), and ultimately set up a maritime heritage centre for the ship. The Unicorn Preservation Society was seeking gifts of large oaks to replace the planking and strengthen the hull before moving the ship to dry dock. These donations have included £1.11m in July 2023 from the National Heritage Memorial Fund.

In January 2025, it was announced that the ship had received approximately £796,000 (US$1 million) in funding from the UK National Lottery. The funding will form part of what is hoped will be a £10 million (about US$12 million) restoration project. However, to achieve the full £10 million funding, the preservation society has until an April deadline to raise an additional £650,000 ($820,000 USD) to demonstrate the viability of the ship restoration.

== Similar ships ==
Unicorn's sister ship, HMS Trincomalee, has also been preserved and is the centrepiece of the National Museum of the Royal Navy based in Hartlepool. Trincomalee and Unicorn are the second- and third-oldest ships still afloat, the oldest being the USS Constitution of 1797. Unicorn is believed to be the most original preserved ship of her era, retaining 90 per cent of her original fabric.

== Gallery ==
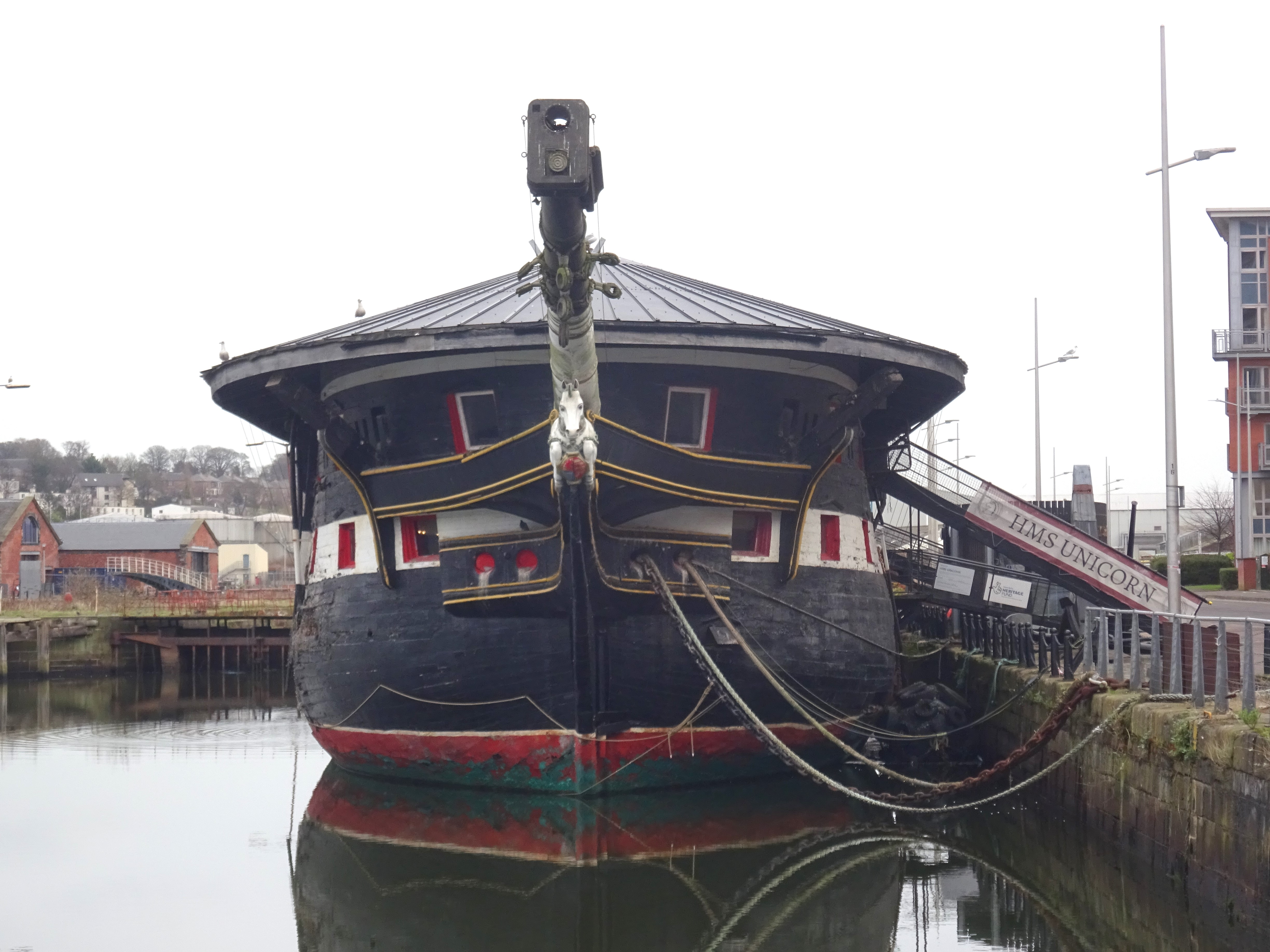
Bow View.

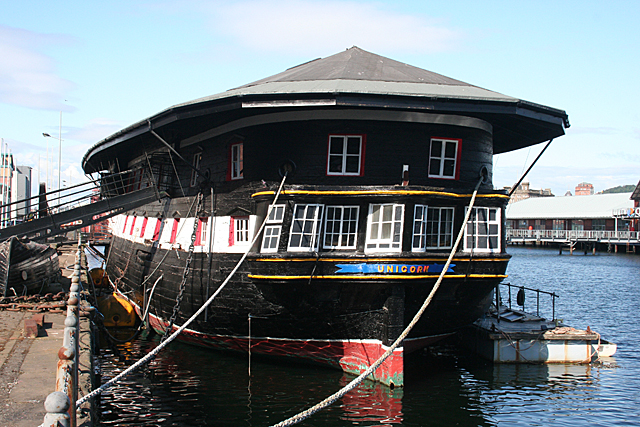
Stern View.

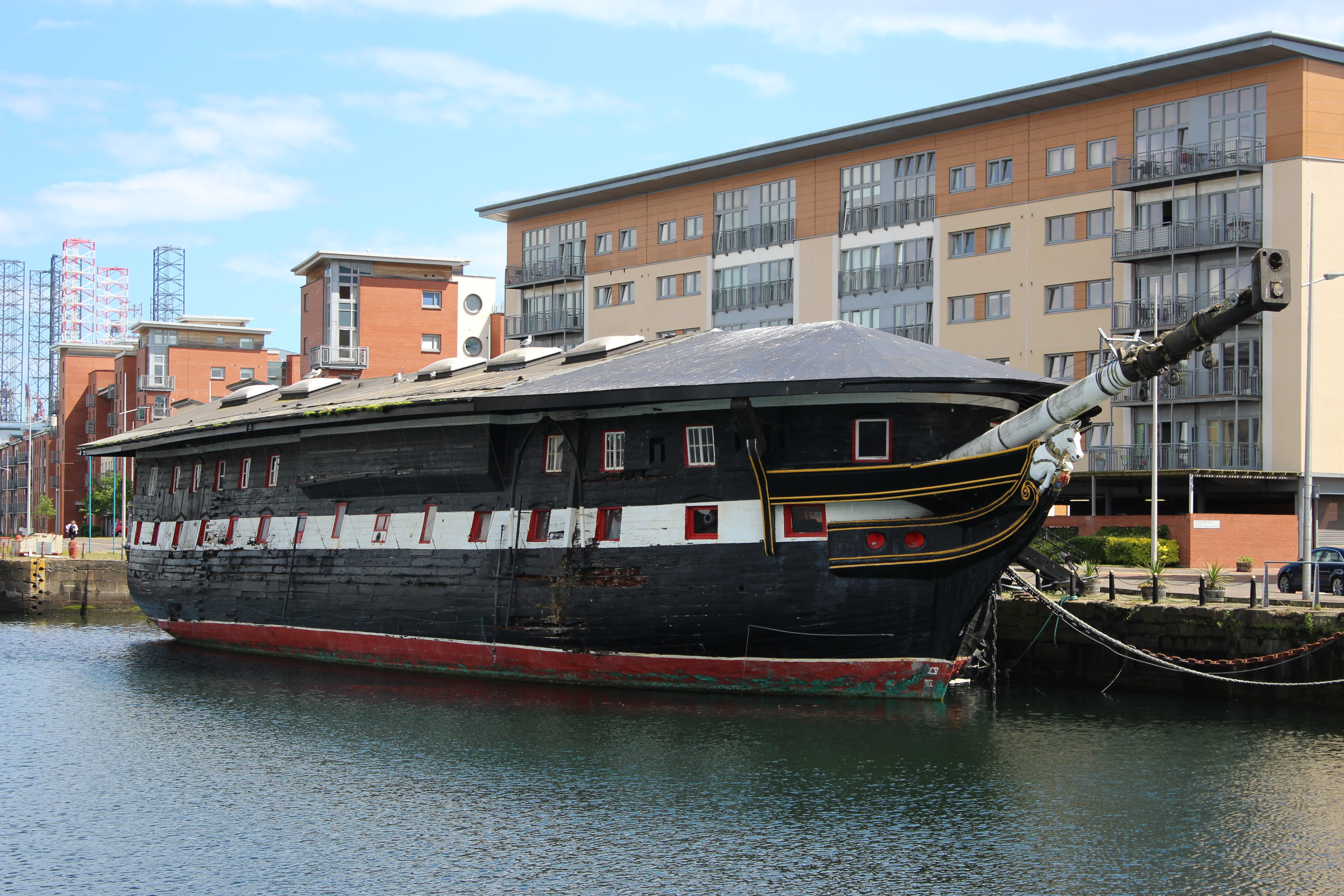
Starboard View.

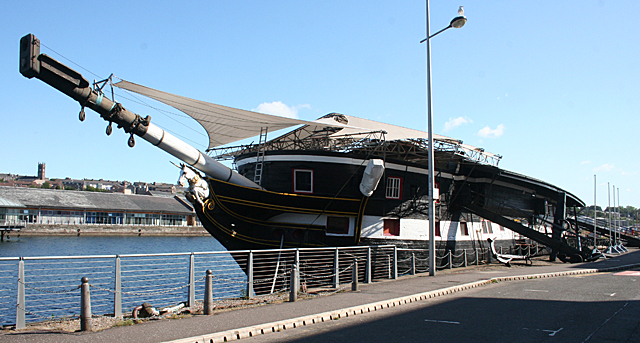
Larboard (Port) View.

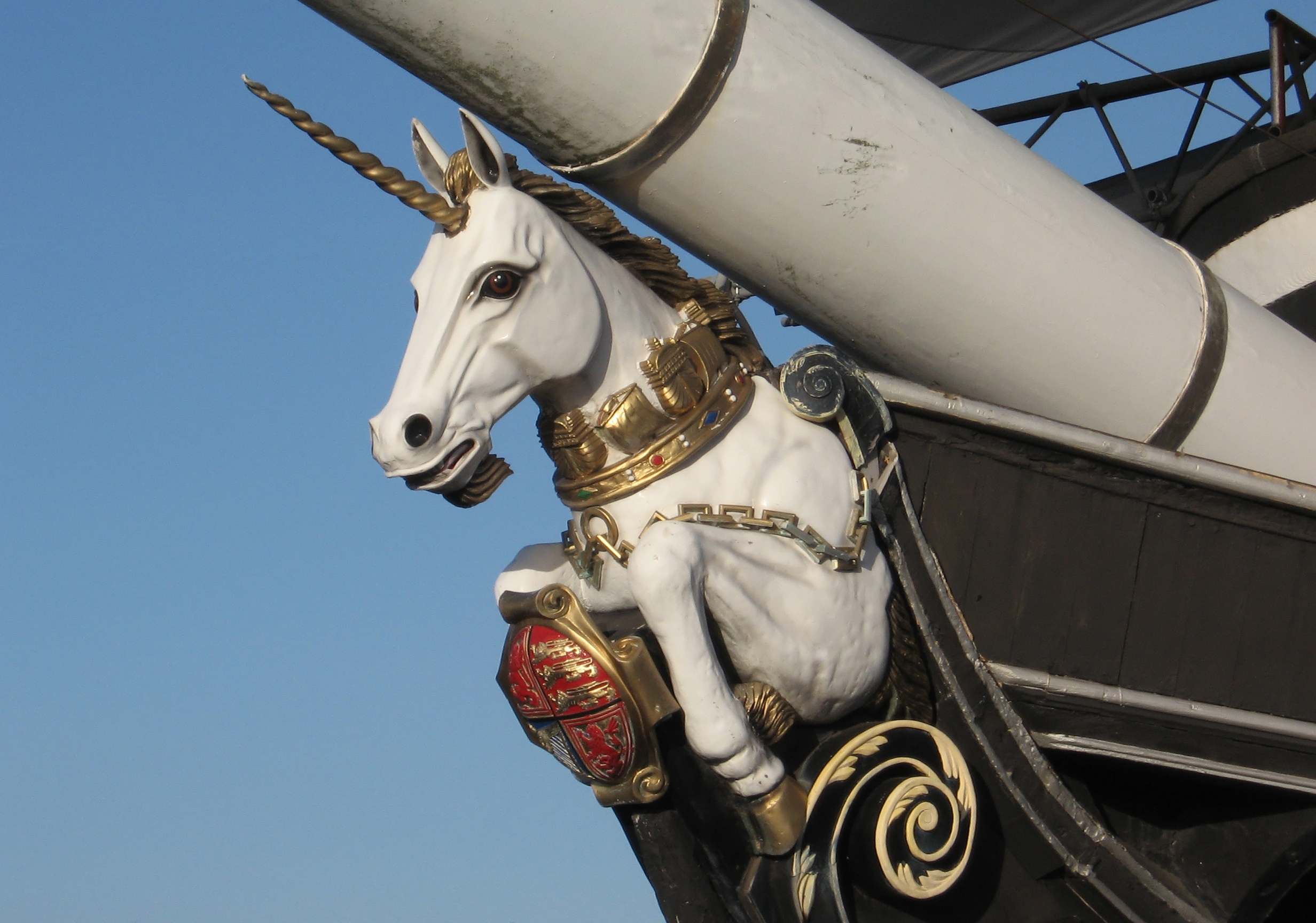
Unicorn figurehead below the bowsprit.

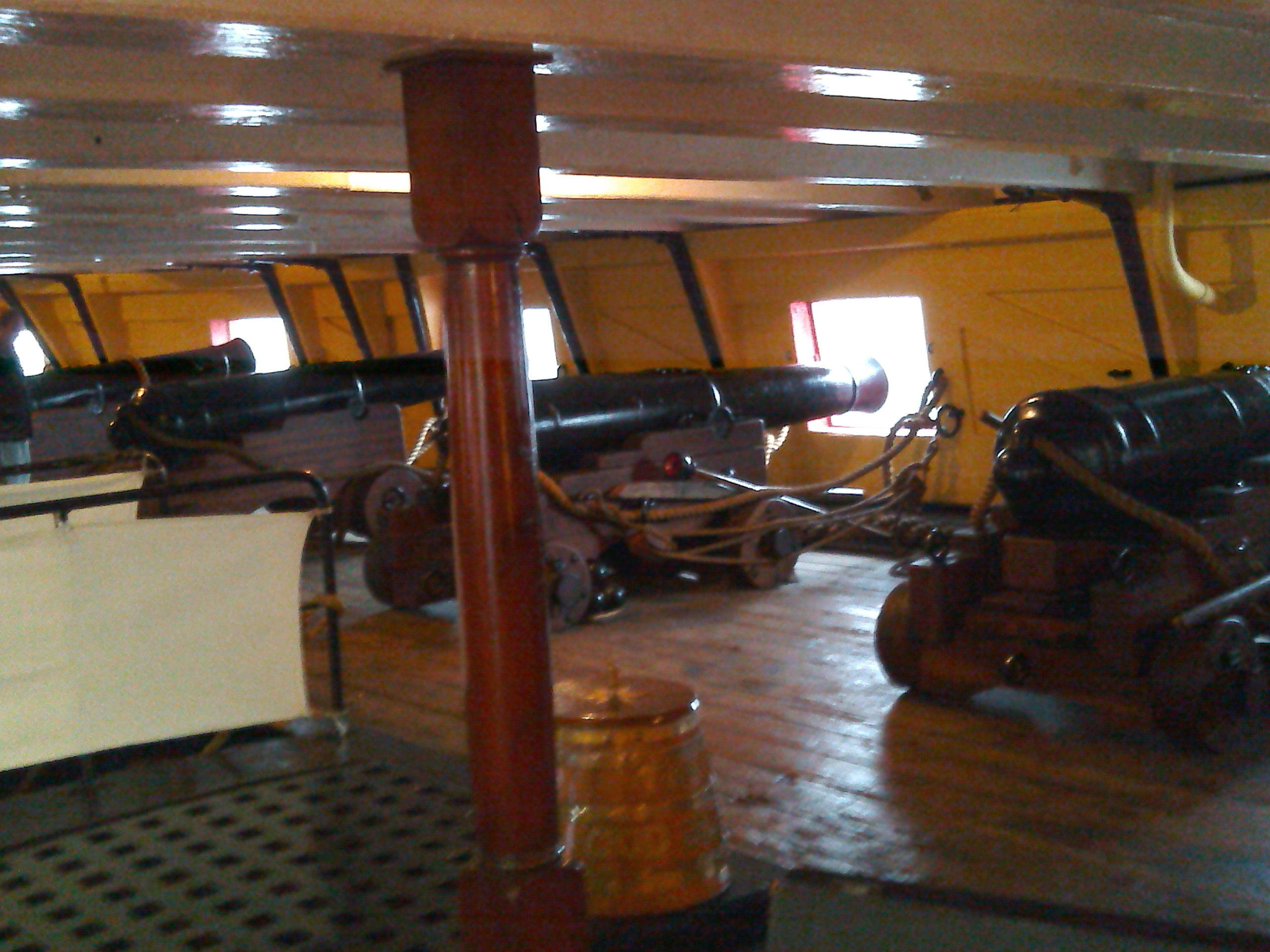
The Gun Deck.

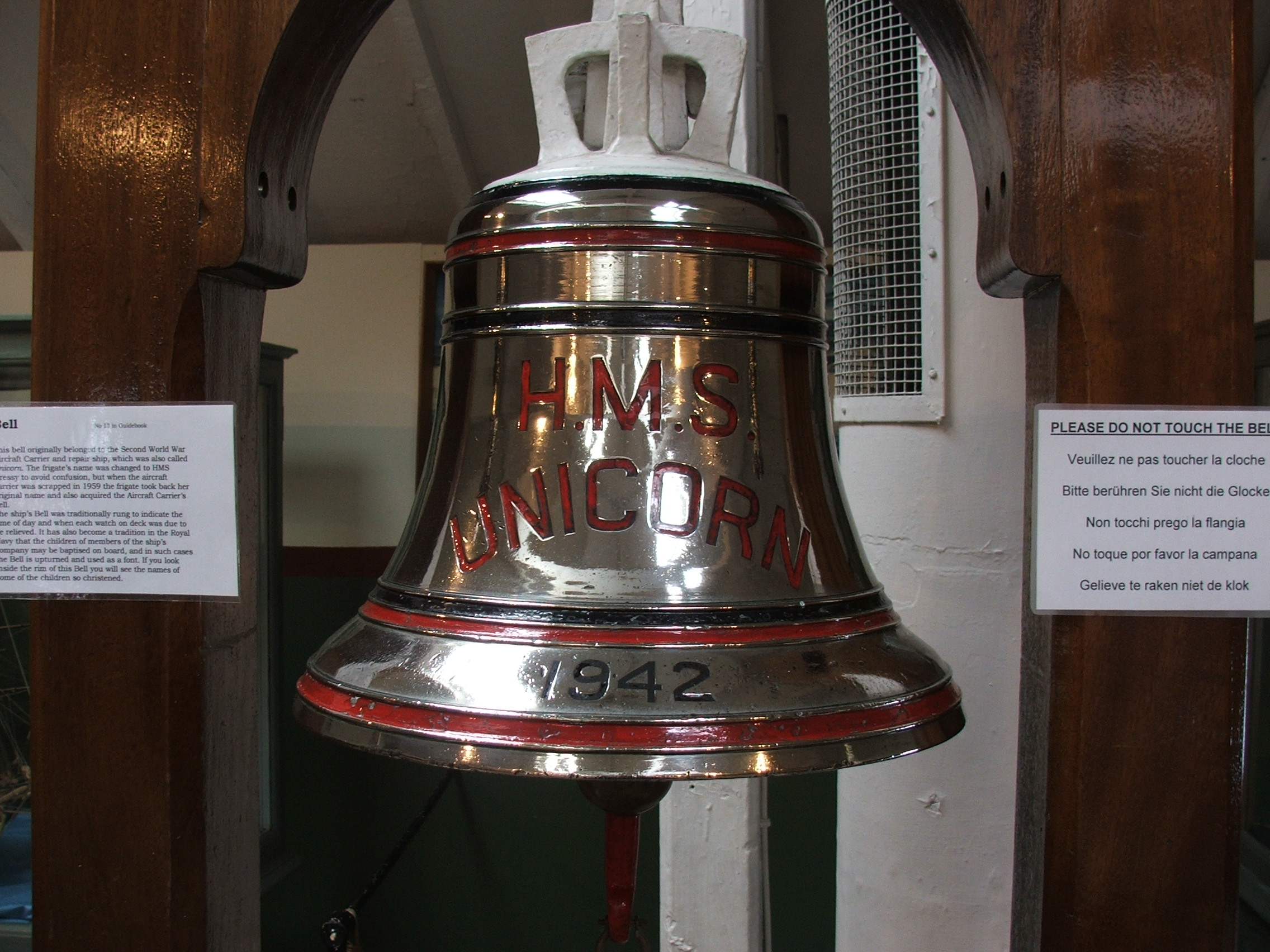
Ship's bell from the 1943 HMS Unicorn onboard the wooden warship.

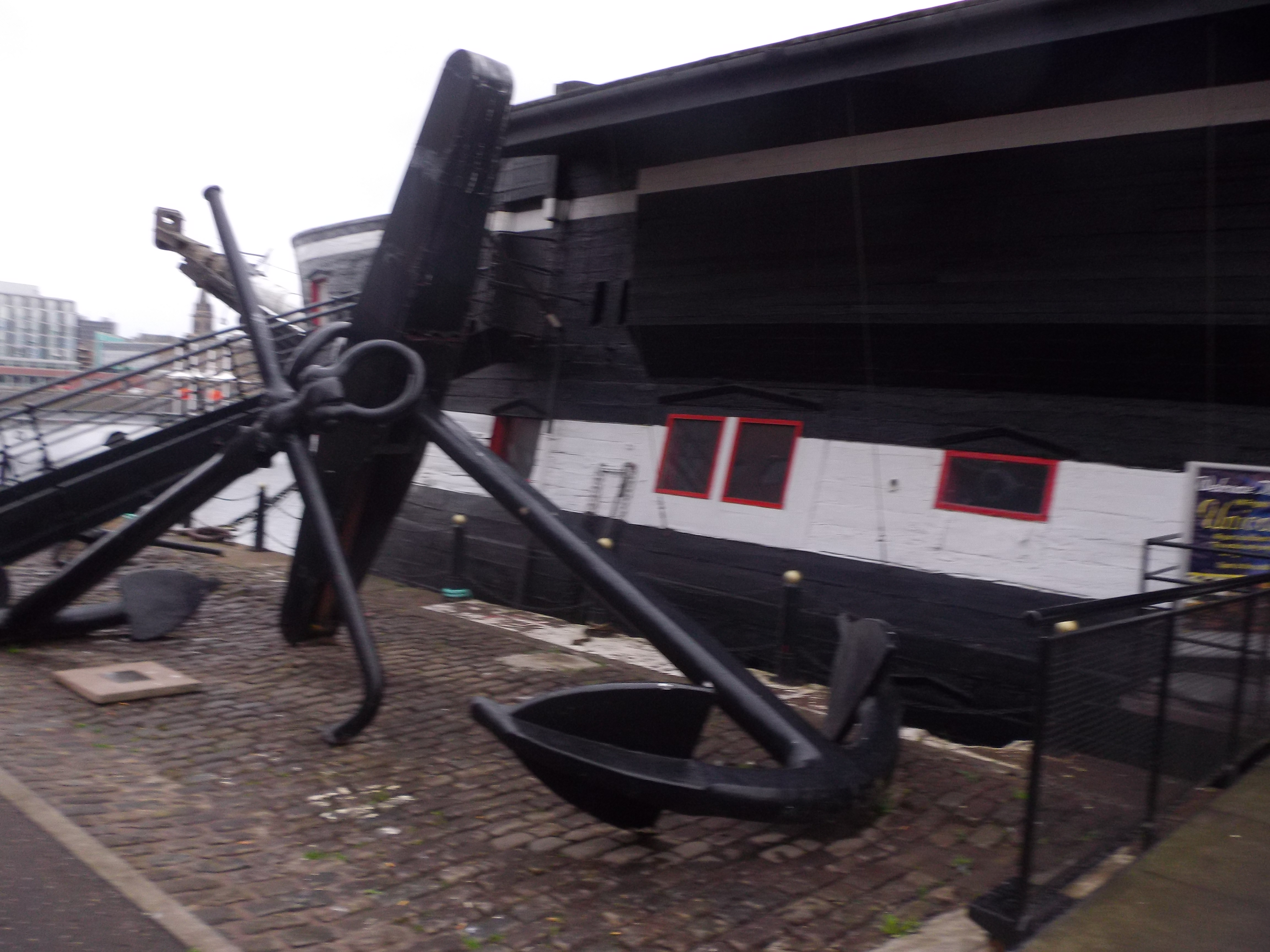
Ship's Anchor.

== Footnotes ==
- David Lyon and Rif Winfield (2004), The Sail and Steam Navy List: All the Ships of the Royal Navy 1815-1889. Chatham Publishing. ISBN 1-86176-032-9.
