= The Vikings (reenactment group) =

- Founded: 1971
- Location: United Kingdom, Ireland, Netherlands, United States, Canada, Italy
- Period: Early Middle Ages
- Speciality: Combat reenactment, living history, educational visits
- Number of members: 1,500+
- Member groups: 45+
- Website: www.vikingsonline.org.uk

The Vikings (previously the Norse Film and Pageant Society) is a British-based society of historical re-enactors, dedicated to the study and re-enactment of the culture of the Viking Age (790–1066) and the display of authentic Dark Ages living history and combat.

== Origins ==
The group was founded by Peter Seymour and Alan Jeffery in 1971 as the Norse Film and Pageant Society (NFPS), initially as an extension to their 'Central Focus' WWII film club, with the purpose of bringing an awareness of the Norse Myths and the Viking culture to the public through dramatic entertainment. Originally, the society consisted of some thirty core members, including the 'Odin Guard', an elite combat group maintaining Norse Heathen religious practices and values. The Odin Guard left the society during the leadership of Gerry East, whose recruitment tactics eventually took the membership over three hundred.

The Vikings is the oldest and largest Dark Ages society in the United Kingdom, and is a founding member of the National Association of Re-enactment Societies. The society now has over 1,500 members throughout Britain, Europe and North America. While the Society concentrates mainly on the 10th Century, events are often set in the wider period from 790 to 1066, with the appropriate modifications to dress and equipment used.

Despite the name of the society, the groups within it portray Saxon, Norman, Celtic, and Viking cultures.

== Objectives ==
The Vikings' goal is to provide an accurate and educational portrayal of the Viking period, with equal emphasis on the daily life of the period and on the more warlike aspects of life in what was a formative period in European history. Events staged by The Vikings aim for a high standard of presentation, historical accuracy and attention to detail. For combat displays, which combine public entertainment with a historical background, the battle organisers strive to recreate an event local to the area. Aside from the combat, at each event there are extensive living history displays which present a cross-section of life in the tenth century.

== Local groups ==
The Vikings has local groups in the UK, mainland Europe and Northern America, each group usually numbers between 5 and 50 members depending on the region. The groups are each led by a Sturaesman (or -woman) or Jarl, who deals with the administrative and organisational aspects, and when at large events each will usually fight as one unit.

== Educational visits ==
Aside from the main events, in many regions of the UK the society offers school visits by experienced and knowledgeable personnel in full period dress and equipment. These visits include a variety of activities based around the UK National Curriculum framework of Key Stage Two's “Invaders and Settlers” topic.

The society also provides resources for schools, including a teacher's resource book for KS2. In some cases, clothing and equipment can be loaned to schools for short periods to assist in classroom work.

All visitors hold either a CRB disclosure to a minimum of standard level, or one from Disclosure Scotland.

== Membership ==
Full membership of The Vikings is open to anyone over the age of 18. In the UK, children aged 16 and 17 are allowed to train and participate in the combat displays when accompanied by an adult. Due to safety regulations, children under 16 years old may not take part in combat displays, although correctly dressed and equipped 13-15 year olds are used as battlefield runners and/or waterbearers.

== Battle of Hastings reenactments ==
Since 1995, The Vikings has been the primary organiser for the combat and living history portions of the Battle of Hastings reenactment events.

== See also ==
- List of historical reenactment groups
- The Vikings Canada (now "The Vikings Vinland")
