= English Civil War Society =

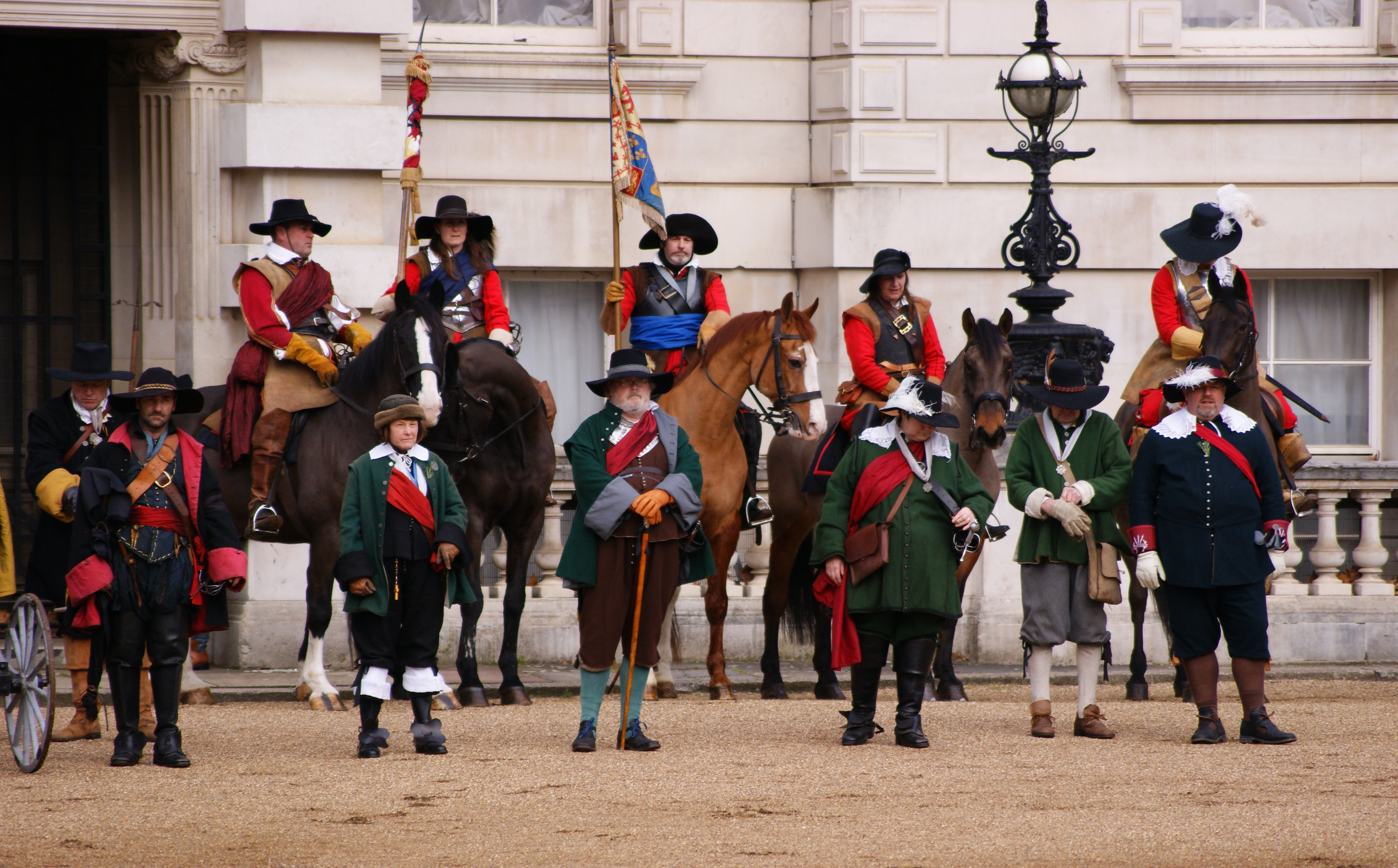
English Civil War Society reenactment people in 2015

The English Civil War Society was founded in 1980 and is the umbrella organisation for the King's Army and the Roundhead Association. The purpose of the Society is to raise awareness of the conflict between King Charles I of England and his supporters and their opponents in Parliament and Scotland. The society does this by staging re-enactments of civil war battles and other types of living history and educational displays across the UK. The re-enactment societies are concerned with technical details about regiments, their weapons and their clothing and way of life as well as mock battles using authentic pikes, muskets and cannon.

== Regiments ==
The English Civil War Society consists of many smaller subdivisions, each run semi-autonomously, and which are known to their members as "regiments". Each of these regiments falls under one or other of the two armies of the English Civil War Society, the Roundhead Association and the King's Army. The Roundhead Association army represents the army of Parliament – the "roundheads" – and also the Covenanters of Scotland, whilst the Kings Army represents that of the King – the "cavaliers" or "royalists". The King's Army currently has seven regiments under its control and the Roundhead Association has thirteen. There are regiments of "foote", which are common foot soldiers and are armed with pike or musket; regiments of "horse", which are groups on horseback and armed with swords and carbines; and regiments of artillery armed with cannon of various sizes.

== See also ==
- List of historical reenactment groups
