= National Association of Re-enactment Societies =

The National Association of Re-enactment Societies (NAReS) was formed in 1991 and is a UK organisation that brings together UK historical re-enactment groups.

== Objectives ==
Its aim is to take the lead in safety standards and professionalism within historical re-enactment.

== Activities ==
It acts as a liaison and negotiating body between UK government, other legislative bodies and the police. Guidance on a wide range of topics (e.g. Health & Safety, Firearms) is issued and conferences and training events are held for re-enactment societies throughout the United Kingdom.

== Current Member Groups & Societies for 2020 ==
• Crown and Empire

• Linstock & Pledget

• Re-enacting Ancient Times Society

• East Yorkshire Regiment Living History Association

• 2nd Guards Rifle Division

• Northern Rough Riders

• Regia Anglorum

• The Sealed Knot

• Trailblazers

• The Vikings

• World War 2 Living History Association

• 43rd Reconnaissance Regiment LHG

• The Manchester Regiment 1914 – 1918

• The Medieval Siege Society

• Rolling Thunder

• The Ragged Victorians – The Great Unwashed

• The Southern Skirmish Association

• The Wyomings - Authentic Western Society

• The American Civil War Society

• The Mid-Victorian Militia

• The Cheshire Home Guard

This list will be updated as new Groups & Societies become member organisation of NAReS

This page is also monitored regularly.

Richard Simmons NAReS Chairman
