= The Civil War: A Narrative =

Work by Shelby Foote

- Volumes 1–3, hardcover
- Author: Shelby Foote
- Language: English
- Subject: American Civil War
- Genre: Narrative history
- Publisher: Random House
- Publication date: 1958, 1963, 1974
- Publication place: United States
- Pages: 2,968
- ISBN: 0-307-29038-7 (original three-volume set)
- OCLC: 704441101
- Dewey Decimal: 973.7
- LC Class: E468 .F7

The Civil War: A Narrative (1958–1974) is a three-volume, 2,968-page, 1.2 million-word history of the American Civil War by Shelby Foote. Although previously known as a novelist, Foote is most famous for this non-fictional narrative history. While it touches on political and social themes, the main thrust of the work is military history. The individual volumes include Fort Sumter to Perryville (1958), Fredericksburg to Meridian (1963), and Red River to Appomattox (1974).

== Writing ==
On the strength of his novel Shiloh, Bennett Cerf of Random House asked Foote to write a short history of the Civil War in time to capitalize on the centenary of the war. Cerf offered him a contract for a work of approximately 200,000 words. Foote worked for several weeks on an outline and decided that Cerf's specifications were too small. He requested the project be expanded to three volumes of 5–600,000 words each. He estimated it would take nine years. It took twenty.

During the project, Foote lived off three Guggenheim Fellowships (1955, 1956, 1959), Ford Foundation grants, and loans from his longtime friend Walker Percy. Foote finished the trilogy's first volume, Fort Sumter to Perryville, a 400,000-word account, in 1958. By 1963 Foote had finished the second volume, Fredericksburg to Meridian. In 1964 he began Volume 3, Red River to Appomattox, but found himself repeatedly distracted by the ongoing events in the nation and was not able to finish and publish it until 1974. Writing the third volume took as many years as had the first two combined.

Foote had no training as a historian. He visited battlefields and read widely: standard biographies, campaign studies, and recent books by Hudson Strode, Bruce Catton, James G. Randall, Clifford Dowdey, T. Harry Williams, Kenneth M. Stampp and Allan Nevins. He also mined the primary sources in the 128-volume Official Records of the War of the Rebellion. He developed new respect for such disparate figures as Ulysses S. Grant, William T. Sherman, Patrick Cleburne, Edwin Stanton and Jefferson Davis. By contrast, he grew to dislike such figures as Phil Sheridan and Joe Johnston.

Foote described himself as a "novelist-historian" who employed "the historian’s standards without his paraphernalia" and "employed the novelist’s methods without his license." To heighten the storytelling of his book, Foote did not utilize footnotes. Citations would have "totally shattered what I was doing. I didn't want people glancing down at the bottom of the page every other sentence".

== Volumes ==
The Civil War: A Narrative
Volume 1, first edition

Volume 2, first edition

Volume 3, first edition

=== Fort Sumter to Perryville ===
The first volume covers the roots of the war to the Battle of Perryville on October 8, 1862. All the significant battles are here, from Bull Run through Shiloh, the Seven Days Battles, Second Bull Run to Antietam, and Perryville in the fall of 1862, but so are the smaller and often equally important engagements on both land and sea: Ball's Bluff, Fort Donelson, Pea Ridge, Island No. Ten, New Orleans, Monitor versus Merrimac, and Stonewall Jackson's Valley Campaign.

=== Fredericksburg to Meridian ===
The second volume is dominated by the almost continual confrontation of great armies. The starting point for this volume is the Battle of Fredericksburg, fought on December 13, 1862, between General Robert E. Lee's Army of Northern Virginia and the Army of the Potomac commanded by Maj. Gen. Ambrose E. Burnside. For the fourth time, the Army of the Potomac attempts to take Richmond, resulting in the bloodbath at Fredericksburg. Then Joseph Hooker tries again, only to be repulsed at Chancellorsville as Stonewall Jackson turns his flank, resulting in Jackson's mortal wounding.

External videos
- Booknotes interview with Foote on Stars in Their Courses, September 11, 1994, C-SPAN

In the West, one of the most complex and determined sieges of the war has begun. Here, Ulysses S. Grant's seven relentless efforts against Vicksburg demonstrate Lincoln's and Grant's determination. With Vicksburg finally under siege, Lee again invades the North. The three-day conflict at Gettysburg receives significant coverage. (The lengthy chapter on Gettysburg has also been published as a separate book, Stars in Their Courses: The Gettysburg Campaign, June–July 1863; his account of Vicksburg was published separately as The Beleaguered City: The Vicksburg Campaign, December 1862 – July 1863.)

=== Red River to Appomattox ===
The final volume opens with the beginning of the two final, major confrontations of the war: Grant against Lee in Virginia, and Sherman pressing Johnston in north Georgia in 1864. The narrative describes the events and battles from Sherman's March to the Sea to Lincoln's assassination and the surrender of Lee at Appomattox.

== Reception and legacy ==
Many reviews of The Civil War: A Narrative praised its style. Southern historian C. Vann Woodward argued Foote's work was acceptable "narrative history," which "nonprofessionals have all but taken over." Foote was criticized for his lack of interest in more current historical research, and for a less firm grasp of politics than of military affairs. John F. Marszalek praised Foote's grasp of military history, "Twenty years of dedicated labor have resulted in a literary masterpiece which places Shelby Foote among those very few historians who are authors of major syntheses...this history will long stand with the volumes of Bruce Catton as the final word on the military history of the Civil War."

In 1993, Richard N. Current argued that Foote too often depended on a single source for lifelike details, but "probably is as accurate as most historians...Foote's monumental narrative most likely will continue to be read and remembered as a classic of its kind." Academic historians routinely lament Foote's lack of citations.

Eric Foner and Leon Litwack felt Foote underplayed the extent of Southern white racism, treating "white southerners" as synonymous with all "southerners." Litwack concluded that "Foote is an engaging battlefield guide, a master of the anecdote, and a gifted and charming story teller, but he is not a good historian." Foote's biographer concluded, "at its best, Foote's writing dramatised tensions related to racial and regional identity. At its worst, it fell back on the social prescriptions of Southern paternalism."

Many critics read Foote as sympathetic to the Lost Cause of the Confederacy. He relied extensively on the work of Hudson Strode, whose sympathy for Lost Cause claims resulted in a portrait of Jefferson Davis as a tragic hero without many of the flaws attributed to him by other historians. Annette Gordon-Reed suggested Foote's work is powered by romantic nostalgia and bears "the very strong mark of memory as opposed to history...the memories of that war which grew up with many white Southern males of his generation, are what power the narrative."

Chandra Manning suggests Foote belongs to a school of Civil War historiography that "answers 'where does slavery fit in the Union cause' by saying 'nowhere,' except maybe in the most reluctant and instrumental way". Joshua M. Zeitz described Foote as "living proof that many Americans...remain under the spell of a century-old tendency to mystify the Confederacy's martial glory at the expense of recalling the intense ideological purpose associated with its cause...we remain very much under the spell of Robert E. Lee, even as we decry slavery and its legacy".

In a 2011 commentary, Ta-Nehisi Coates concluded that The Civil War was not a "neo-Confederate apologia", but he lamented Foote's lack of a black perspective: "Shelby Foote wrote The Civil War, but he never understood it. Understanding the Civil War was a luxury his whiteness could ill-afford."

In 2017, the conservative writer Bill Kauffman, writing in The American Conservative, argued for a revival of Foote's sympathetic portrayal of the South. In October 2017, John F. Kelly, the White House Chief of Staff for President Donald Trump, argued that "the lack of ability to compromise led to the Civil War" and praised Robert E. Lee as an "honorable man". White House Press Secretary Sarah Huckabee Sanders defended Kelly's controversial remarks by citing Foote's work.

== Detailed release information ==
An in general well received work, it has over the decades seen several editions issued pursuant its original release.

- Original hardcover with dust jacket release by Random House:
  - The Civil War: A Narrative. New York: Random House. 1958–1974. ISBN 0-307-29038-7. – boxed set
  1. The Civil War: A Narrative, Vol. 1: Fort Sumter to Perryville. New York: Random House. 1958. ISBN 0-307-29039-5.
  2. The Civil War: A Narrative, Vol. 2: Fredericksburg to Meridian. New York: Random House. 1963. ISBN 0-307-29040-9.
  3. The Civil War: A Narrative, Vol. 3: Red River to Appomattox. New York: Random House. 1974. ISBN 0-307-29041-7.
- Vintage Books, a Random House subsidiary, reissued the set twice as trade paperbacks in January and November 1986, with different cover art for each printing but without changing the ISBNs:
  - The Civil War: A Narrative. New York: Vintage Books. 1986. ISBN 0-394-74913-8. – boxed set
  1. The Civil War: A Narrative, Vol. 1: Fort Sumter to Perryville. New York: Vintage Books. 1986. ISBN 0-394-74623-6.
  2. The Civil War: A Narrative, Vol. 2: Fredericksburg to Meridian. New York: Vintage Books. 1986. ISBN 0-394-74621-X.
  3. The Civil War: A Narrative, Vol. 3: Red River to Appomattox. New York: Vintage Books. 1986. ISBN 0-394-74622-8.
- Easton Press, reissued the work as a deluxe in burgundy red gold imprinted leather bound signed (so indicated on the spine of some, but not all, copies of volume I) facsimile three-volume "Collector's Edition" set in 1991 along with a cheaper non-signed variant, none of which endowed with ISBNs. Seven years later they reissued the three-volume set again, but now as part of their massive equally deluxe black leather bound The Civil War Library in 35 Volumes collection, still without ISBNs.
- Beginning in 1999, Time–Life Books published a fourteen volume "40th Anniversary Edition" with contemporary photographs and illustrations, addended with maps originally commissioned for their own 1983-87 comprehensive The Civil War book series. This hardcover with dust jacket edition was sold by subscription, but after Time–Life had exited the book business in 2001, remaindered copies started to appear in bookstores from 2009 onward. Relatively few copies of volume 13 were printed, for the time being increasing the after-market value of that particular volume and the set as a whole. The divisions were based on keeping each volume to 288–300 pages (a few are shorter or longer), rather than historic or thematic considerations. Each volume has its own index, which appears to be more detailed than the indexes in the three-volume edition. For example, "Rockfish Gap" appears in volume 13 of the Time–Life set, but not in volume 3 of the original edition.
  1. The Civil War: A Narrative, Secession to Fort Henry (40th Anniversary ed.). Alexandria, VA: Time-Life. 1999. ISBN 0-7835-0100-5.
  2. The Civil War: A Narrative, Fort Donelson to Memphis (40th Anniversary ed.). Alexandria, VA: Time-Life. 1999. ISBN 0-7835-0101-3.
  3. The Civil War: A Narrative, Yorktown to Cedar Mountain (40th Anniversary ed.). Alexandria, VA: Time-Life. 1999. ISBN 0-7835-0102-1.
  4. The Civil War: A Narrative, Second Manassas to Pocotaligo (40th Anniversary ed.). Alexandria, VA: Time-Life. 1999. ISBN 0-7835-0103-X.
  5. The Civil War: A Narrative, Fredericksburg to Steele Bayou (40th Anniversary ed.). Alexandria, VA: Time-Life. 1999. ISBN 0-7835-0104-8.
  6. The Civil War: A Narrative, Charleston Harbor to Vicksburg (40th Anniversary ed.). Alexandria, VA: Time-Life. 1999. ISBN 0-7835-0105-6.
  7. The Civil War: A Narrative, Gettysburg to Draft Riots (40th Anniversary ed.). Alexandria, VA: Time-Life. 1999. ISBN 0-7835-0106-4.
  8. The Civil War: A Narrative, Tullahoma to Missionary Ridge (40th Anniversary ed.). Alexandria, VA: Time-Life. 1999. ISBN 0-7835-0107-2.
  9. The Civil War: A Narrative, Mine Run to Meridian (40th Anniversary ed.). Alexandria, VA: Time-Life. 2001. ISBN 0-7835-0108-0.
  10. The Civil War: A Narrative, Red River to Spotsylvania (40th Anniversary ed.). Alexandria, VA: Time-Life. 2001. ISBN 0-7835-0109-9.
  11. The Civil War: A Narrative, Yellow Tavern to Cold Harbor (40th Anniversary ed.). Alexandria, VA: Time-Life. 2000. ISBN 0-7835-0110-2.
  12. The Civil War: A Narrative, James Crossing to Johnsonville (40th Anniversary ed.). Alexandria, VA: Time-Life. 2000. ISBN 0-7835-0111-0.
  13. The Civil War: A Narrative, Petersburg Siege to Bentonville (40th Anniversary ed.). Alexandria, VA: Time-Life. 2000. ISBN 0-7835-0112-9.
  14. The Civil War: A Narrative, Fort Stedman to Reconstruction (40th Anniversary ed.). Alexandria, VA: Time-Life. 2000. ISBN 0-7835-0113-7.
- In 2005, Random House published the narratives as nine hardcover with dust jacket volumes by splitting the original three into three volumes each. As with the preceding Time-Life edition, some of the maps from the original work, hand drawn by Foote, were replaced by more elaborate, full-color maps that originally appeared in the Time-Life Civil War history books series. Photographs and artwork were also added. Like the Time-Life edition, no box set variant was issued for this release.
  1. The Civil War: A Narrative, Fort Sumter to Kernstown: First Blood–The Thing Gets Under Way. New York: Random House. 2005. ISBN 0-307-29023-9.
  2. The Civil War: A Narrative, Pea Ridge to the Seven Days: War Means Fighting, Fighting Means Killing. New York: Random House. 2005. ISBN 0-307-29024-7.
  3. The Civil War: A Narrative, Second Manassas to Perryville: The Sun Shines South. New York: Random House. 2005. ISBN 0-307-29025-5.
  4. The Civil War: A Narrative, Fredericksburg to Chancellorsville: The Longest Journey. New York: Random House. 2005. ISBN 0-307-29026-3.
  5. The Civil War: A Narrative, Gettysburg to Vicksburg: Unvexed to the Sea. New York: Random House. 2005. ISBN 0-307-29027-1.
  6. The Civil War: A Narrative, Tullahoma to Meridian: Riot and Resurgence. New York: Random House. 2005. ISBN 0-307-29028-X.
  7. The Civil War: A Narrative, Red River to Chattahoochee: Another Grand Design. New York: Random House. 2005. ISBN 0-307-29029-8.
  8. The Civil War: A Narrative, Petersburg to Savannah: War Is Cruelty–You Cannot Refine It. New York: Random House. 2005. ISBN 0-307-29030-1.
  9. The Civil War: A Narrative, Five Forks to Appomattox: Victory and Defeat. New York: Random House. 2005. ISBN 0-307-29031-X.
- In 2011, Random House released a new hardcover (without dust jacket) edition of the trilogy, edited by Jon Meacham, along with a companion volume by Meacham entitled American Homer: Reflections on Shelby Foote and His Classic The Civil War: A Narrative:
  - The Civil War: A Narrative. New York: Random House. 2011. ISBN 978-0-679-64370-8. OCLC 671703677. – boxed set (individual volumes not endowed with ISBN)
  1. The Civil War: A Narrative, Vol. 1: Fort Sumter to Perryville. New York: Random House. 2011.
  2. The Civil War: A Narrative, Vol. 2: Fredericksburg to Meridian. New York: Random House. 2011.
  3. The Civil War: A Narrative, Vol. 3: Red River to Appomattox. New York: Random House. 2011.
  4. Meacham, Jon, ed. (2011). American Homer: Reflections on Shelby Foote and His Classic The Civil War: A Narrative. New York: Random House.
