= Confederates in the Attic =

1998 nonfiction book by Tony Horwitz

Confederates in the Attic: Dispatches from the Unfinished Civil War
- First edition
- Author: Tony Horwitz
- Language: English
- Genre: Historical, Non-fiction
- Publisher: Pantheon
- Publication date: March 3, 1998
- Publication place: United States
- Media type: Print (Hardback and Paperback)
- Pages: 432 pp
- ISBN: 0-679-75833-X

Confederates in the Attic (1998) is a non-fiction book by Tony Horwitz. Horwitz explores his interest in the American Civil War and investigates the ties in the United States among citizens to a war that ended more than 130 years previously. He reports on attitudes on the Civil War and how it is discussed and taught, as well as attitudes about race.

Among the experiences Horwitz has in the book:

- Horwitz's first day with reenactors, led by Robert Lee Hodge, a hardcore reenactor who is featured on the cover of the book. He is a waiter.
- Lee-Jackson Day in North Carolina
- Touring Charleston, South Carolina, including Fort Sumter National Monument
- Studying a Union soldier on a monument celebrating Confederates in Kingstree, South Carolina
- The aftermath of the murder of Michael Westerman, a Todd County, Kentucky man killed by a shot fired from a car containing black teenagers, for having a Confederate flag on the back of his pickup truck
- A reenactment of the Battle of the Wilderness in Virginia
- A visit with the historian and novelist Shelby Foote, author of The Civil War: A Narrative (1958, 1963, 1974). He had become more widely known after appearing in Ken Burns's Civil War documentary
- Visiting Shiloh National Military Park during the anniversary of the battle.
- Exploring the "truth" about Gone with the Wind
- Visiting Andersonville National Historic Site, site of a Confederate prison where Union soldiers were held
- Visiting Fitzgerald, Georgia, a town founded by union veterans in Georgia which became notable for reconciliation between Union and Confederate veterans
- Touring Vicksburg, Mississippi
- Going on Robert Hodge's "Civil Wargasm", a week-long journey to various battle sites in Virginia and Maryland, remaining in authentic uniform and sleeping on the battlefields
- An off-and-on chat with Alberta Martin, believed at the time to be the last surviving widow of a Confederate soldier.
- Confederate heritage in Selma, Alabama
- "[R]esurgence of anti-Federal hostility and racial separatism"

Confederates in the Attic became a bestseller in the United States. The New York Times described it as intellectually honest and humorous, saying Horwitz seemed uncomfortable placed between two sides, seeking peace between the factions.

Toward the end of the chapter on Alberta Martin, Horwitz states that Martin's Confederate husband was a deserter. In response, in 1998 the Southern Legal Resource Center threatened to sue Horwitz on Martin's behalf, with encouragement from the Sons of Confederate Veterans, saying that two other William Martins were on the rolls of the same company as Alberta's husband.

In 2000 the University of North Carolina's Chapel Hill campus added Confederates in the Attic to its freshman reading list.
