= John Martin Finlay =

American writer (1941–1991)

- Born: January 24, 1941; Ozark, Alabama, U.S.
- Died: February 17, 1991 (aged 50); Flowers Hospital in Dothan, Alabama, U.S.
- Occupations: Poet, essayist
- Writing career
- Genre: Poetry
- Notable works: Mind and Blood: The Collected Poems of John Finlay

John Martin Finlay (January 24, 1941 – February 17, 1991) was an American poet and writer of essays, reviews, fiction, letters, and diaries.

Finlay is best known for his posthumously published poetry collection, Mind and Blood: The Collected Poems of John Finlay.

== Life ==
=== Early years ===
John Finlay was born in Ozark, Alabama. One of five children, Finlay grew up on a peanut and dairy farm owned by his parents, Tom Coston Finlay and Jean Sorrell Finlay, near Enterprise, Alabama. Jean Finlay belonged to the established gentry in Ozark; her father, Martin Sorrell, was a lawyer. According to Finlay biographer Jeffrey Goodman:

"John Finlay never liked farming. Enterprise to him meant only the dull, hard life of farm chores, like milking cows or driving the tractor in the Alabama sun. Weekends in Ozark, however, meant his grandmother's library of classics and sweet hours in her leisurely and educated company. Annie Laurie Cullens, an old family fiend, observed Finlay's bright mind and precocious interest in his grandmother's library. Miss Cullens was a newspaper poet with connections to Mencken's wife and the cultural set in Montgomery. She gave John books, and he sat at the kitchen table while she and Uncle Waldo debated the merits of Eisenhower vs. Stevenson, atheism vs. theism, or argued over the latest novels reviewed in the Sunday Times. Back home in Enterprise, when Finlay drove the rusty tractor under the high, July sun, he might steady a copy of Shakespeare on the seat. On the pokey yellow school bus, he read. He named the cows he brought home from pasture after Greek gods and goddesses. By the age of fifteen, he was reading Wordworth's collected poems."

Finlay attended Enterprise High School, where he participated in theater and played a leading role in Thornton Wilder's play Our Town. He was vice-president of his senior class, class orator, and voted "most scholarly."

=== Academic years ===
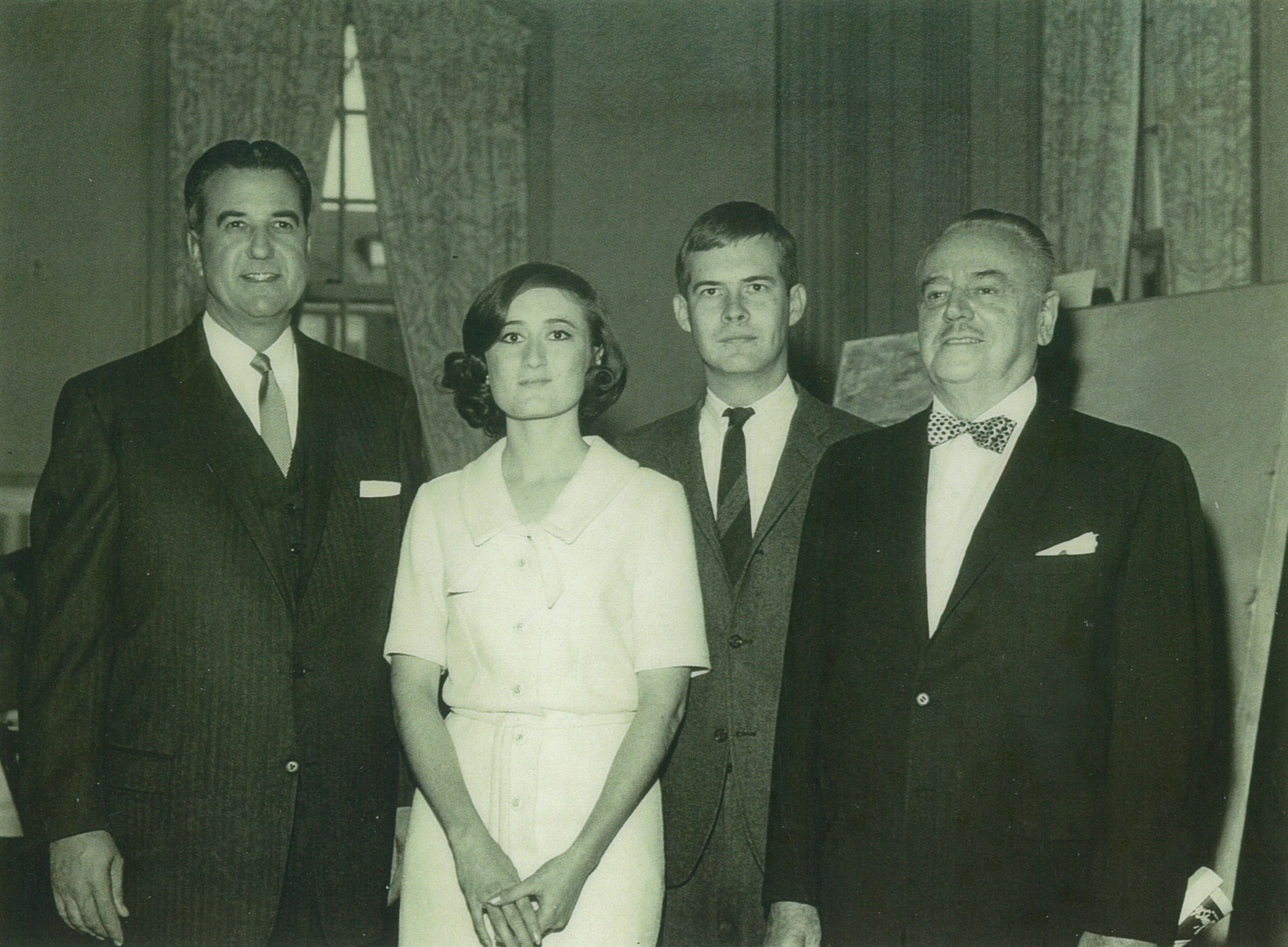
John Martin Finlay (right) and Professor Hudson Strode (far right), circa 1965

In 1959, Finlay enrolled at the University of Alabama. Hudson Strode, an English professor at the university, became an influential part of Finlay academic and personal life. Strode and his wife frequently invited Finlay to dinner and included him on some of their travels in the American South. During one trip to Mississippi, Strode introduced Finlay to John Crowe Ransom. In 1962, Finlay was named to the university's G.E. Academic College Bowl team and was flown to New York for the broadcast.

In 1964, after graduating with a BA in English and a minor in Creative Writing, Finlay started his M.A. program in English at the University of Alabama with a full graduate assistantship. While at Alabama, he wrote poems for Comment, the campus literary magazine, and in 1965 served as its editor-in-chief. Finlay interviewed Eudora Welty for the magazine's Winter issue. He also met Allen Tate—whom Finlay had invited to speak at the university —and Andrew Lytle.

Finlay finished his M.A. program in 1966 and began to teach at Alabama College as an instructor of freshman and sophomore English. In 1969, he gave up his teaching post to pursue his doctorate work. He was inspired to do this after reading an article, "Classicism and the Modern Poet,'' written by English professor—and former student of Yvor Winters—Donald E. Stanford. He wrote to Stanford in November of 1969 requesting to study under him. In 1970, Finlay enrolled in the doctoral program under Stanford at Louisiana State University. After one year, Finlay dropped out and moved to Corfu, where a friend's family was building a hotel. Finlay then moved to Paris in December 1973. After several months in Paris, he ran out of money and had to borrow from his uncle to get home.

Back in Alabama, Finlay got a job in Tuscaloosa at Bryce Hospital. His poem “The Locked Wards” is based on his observations of mental patients in the hospital.

"Bryce was the state mental institution located in Tuscaloosa. Our grandmother’s husband, Warren Martin Sorrell, went there in his 30s and died there. It was always very hushed about as my grandmother never talked about him. They had four small children and she went home to live with her mother in Ozark [Alabama] in the house of the poem ‘The Wide Porch.’ I remember John looking his records up at the hospital. . . . Betty [Finlay Phillips] recalls John answering a suicide hot line while working at Bryce Hospital.”

After working several months at Bryce, he was readmitted to the English doctorate program at LSU. While continuing his coursework and teaching obligations Finlay began working on his dissertation topic, the intellectual theism of Yvor Winter, under the guidance of Stanford. Finlay received his Ph.D. in English from LSU in 1980, the same year he converted to Catholicism. While at LSU, Finlay met David Middleton (later his editor and literary executor), Lindon Stall, and Wyatt Prunty.

=== Writing on the farm ===
It was during Finlay's later years that his writing began to generate serious critical acclaim, first in friends' letters, then in reviews. His strong publications in prestigious journals out of California, New York, England, and the South, established him as a serious writer among his contemporaries.

In 1981, Finlay returned to his family's farm in Enterprise, remaining there for the rest of his life. Except for occasional teaching stints at Enterprise Junior College and helping out on the farm, Finlay engaged in writing, poetry, and scholarship. Within months of returning home, he began studying Plato and taught himself Italian grammar in order to read Dante. Goodman estimates that Finlay produced between eighty and ninety percent of his important work, saying "in a critical and creative fury, he wrote a spate of profound essays and poems." While in Enterprise, Finlay typically wrote between ten and twelve hours at a time, staying up all night and sleeping during the day.

Compared to his early poems, Finlay's later poems focused more on family life in the South since the early nineteenth century, Native American life in the South, the nature of modern war, and the isolation of the serious thinker and artist in the contemporary world. Janet Lewis describes the poems from his later years as being wrought from

"metaphysical thought, meta-physical nightmare, Greek thought, Christian,. . . Pagan, images of the South, Southern families, a Southern boyhood, old people,. . . dying people,. . . the smell of salt, of fish, of rain, of pines and magnolias in the warm air, images of moonlight, and of waves falling on beaches of the Gulf or the Adriatic, Odysseus, Socrates, [and] Athena."

=== Chapbooks ===
Finlay saw his first chapbook of fifteen poems, The Wide Porch, published in 1984; Between the Gulfs, his second chapbook of seventeen poems, appeared in 1986; and his third chapbook of nineteen poems, The Salt of Exposure, followed in 1988.

- The first chapbook traced the Gnostic spirit present in the works of modern writers, using Yvor Winters, Flaubert, Valéry, Newman, Hopkins, Freud, Nietszche, and Kafka as examples. Following the line of argument in the essay “Mere Literature and the Lost Traveller” by Allen Tate, Finlay argued in these essays that, like the world of the third-century Gnostics, the mind of the modern writer was a world from which the living God was absent—deus absconditus.
- The second chapbook was collection of essays on a spirit similar to, perhaps even identical with, the Gnostic spirit, a spirit he found in the works of certain ancient Greek philosophers. Finlay lived to complete two of these essays—“The Night of Alcibiades” and “The Socratics and the Flight from This World.”
- He left behind a partial draft of a third chapbook, untitled, on Plato's Crito.

=== Final years ===
Though Finlay suspected that he had HIV, it wasn't until 1982 that he was diagnosed with AIDS. He kept this diagnosis secret from his close friends until a couple years before his death. In 1985, while attending a writer's conference at Nicholls State University, Finlay got into a serious argument with Middleton (they would not reconcile until 1989). Finlay managed to spend a couple hours each day corresponding with literary friends. In 1988, Bowers and Dick Davis invited Finlay to read his poetry at the University of Santa Barbara, California. On this occasion, he exhibited advanced stages of AIDS, appearing pale, dizzy, and nauseated. Finlay didn't admit his diagnosis to Bowers and Davis despite his appearance.

By 1990, Finlay was blind and partially paralyzed, confined to a railed hospital bed in his room. There he dictated his last poem to his sister, JoAnn Finlay Hall. It is called A Prayer to the Father,” twelve lines in six couplets addressed to God:

Death is not far from me. At times I crave

The peace I think that it will bring. Be brave,

I tell myself, for soon your pain will cease.

But terror still obtains when our long lease

On life ends at last. Body and soul,

Which fused together should make up one whole,

Suffer deprived as they are wrenched apart.

O God of love and power, hold still my heart

When death, that ancient awful fact appears;

Preserve my mind from all deranging fears,

And let me offer up my reason free

And where I thought, there see Thee perfectly.

Finlay died at Flowers Hospital in Dothan, Alabama, on February 17, 1991.

== Legacy ==
Finlay left behind three published chapbooks of poems as well as unpublished and uncollected poems, three essays from an unfinished book on the Greeks, an unpublished book of essays on the Gnostic spirit in modern literature—Flaubert in Egypt and Other Essays—and several journals he kept in Enterprise, on Corfu, in Paris, and in Baton Rouge.

Passages from Finlay's numerous journals were published posthumously in “With Constant Light”: The Collected Essays and Reviews, with Selections from the Diaries, Letters, and Other Prose of John Martin Finlay (1941–1991) by Middleton. An end-note in that volume includes a recollection of Bryce Hospital by Finlay Hall:

Roughly a quarter of Finlay's poetry appeared posthumously. His unpublished book of essays was combined with his other unpublished essays on the Greeks and published in 1994 under a different title, Hermetic Light: Essays on the Gnostic Spirit in Modern Literature and Thought.

In view of Finlay's lifetime of poetry and essays, Jeffrey Goodman articulates Finlay's place among American writers and poets in the twentieth century best:

"As for Finlay's literary place: he was certainly not among the very highest rank of literary geniuses with Shakespeare, Dante, Baudelaire, or Racine. Nor does he stand in the very first rank of American poets. His poetry was just peaking when he died. Yet Finlay's poetry contains here and there lines and passages at that high level. Because he wrote five or six major poems and twenty or more others close to this level, he ranks certainly among the first five or six poets of the American South, and likewise of the post-World War II generation. At the same time, he was one of the most brilliant literary essayists of the last decades of his century. He has indeed earned a place in American letters."

The Finlay Papers is a collection at LSU's Hill Memorial Library. These papers contain the diaries, essays, poems, published books and chapbooks (including copies with late authorial corrections), notes and drafts, book reviews both by and about Finlay, secondary criticism, miscellaneous items, Finlay family letters, and correspondence between Finlay and Robert L. Barth, Edgar Bowers, Dick Davis, Andrew Lytle, David Middleton, Lindon Stall, Donald E. Stanford, Lewis P. Simpson, Clive Wilmer, Janet Lewis Winters, and others.

== Bibliography ==
=== Chapbooks ===
- The Wide Porch and Other Poems. 18 poems. Florence, Kentucky: Robert L. Barth, 1984.
- Between the Gulfs. 17 poems. Notes by Finlay on the poems “Origo mentis” and “Death in Asia Minor.” Florence, Kentucky: Robert L. Barth, 1986.
- The Salt of Exposure. 19 poems. Omaha, Nebraska: Printed by Harry Duncan on The Cummington Press, 1988.

=== Books ===
- A Garland for John Finlay. Edited by David Middleton. Poems by 20 American and British poets; comments on Finlay's poetry by Janet Lewis and Donald E. Stanford; an essay on Finlay's prose by Lewis P. Simpson; and “John Finlay: A Bibliography (1971–1991).” Thibodaux, Louisiana: Blue Heron Press, 1990.
- A Prayer to the Father: Poetry and Prose by John Finlay. Selected and edited from The John Finlay Papers by David Middleton. 25 poems. 9 excerpts from Finlay's diaries. Thibodaux, Louisiana: Blue Heron Press, 1992.
- Mind and Blood: The Collected Poems of John Finlay. Edited and with a Preface by David Middleton. Santa Barbara, California: John Daniel and Company, 1992. This edition assembles the four earlier collections (with important late authorial emendations of several poems in the two Barth chapbooks) as well as 10 uncollected poems published in literary journals.
- Hermetic Light: Essays on the Gnostic Spirit in Modern Literature and Thought. Introduction and six essays. Foreword by Lewis P. Simpson. Edited and with an Afterword by David Middleton. Santa Barbara, California: John Daniel and Company, 1994. Main title chosen by the editor from a line of one of Finlay's poems, “The Illumination of Arthur Rimbaud.” Finlay's own title for this book, Flaubert in Egypt and Other Essays, could not be used for this edition.
- The American Tragedies: A Chronology of Six Poems. Edited and with an Afterword by David Middleton. Edgewood, Kentucky: Robert L. Barth, 1997.
- In Light Apart: The Achievement of John Finlay. Edited by David Middleton. Essays and poems by Finlay and by various hands and with a descriptive bibliography of works by and about Finlay, including the preface “In Light Apart: The Achievement of John Finlay,” pages 7–10, by David Middleton. Glenside, PA: The Aldine Press, 1999.
- “With Constant Light”: The Collected Essays and Reviews, with Selections from the Diaries, Letters, and Other Prose of John Martin Finlay (1941–1991). Edited by David Middleton and John P. Doucet. Belmont, North Carolina: Wiseblood Books, 2020.
- “Dense Poems & Socratic Light”: The Poetry of John Martin Finlay (1941–1991). Edited by David Middleton and John P. Doucet. Belmont, North Carolina: Wiseblood Books, 2020.

=== Cards ===
- Notes for the Perfect Poem. Four-page, one-fold card. 14 prose statements. Excerpt from Finlay's poem “Origo mentis” along with a brief historical comment on the background of the poem by David Middleton. Thibodaux, Louisiana: Blue Heron Press, 1994.
- The Deathless Word: Christian Meditations from the Diaries and Poetry of John Finlay. Four-page, one-fold card. 4 journal entries. Excerpt from Finlay's poem “The Autobiography of a Benedictine.” Thibodaux, Louisiana: Blue Heron Press, 1994.

=== Essays ===
- “Elizabeth Daryush.” The Dictionary of Literary Biography: British Poets, 1914–45. Vol. 20. Edited by Donald E. Stanford. Detroit: Gale Research Company, 1983.109–12.
- “The Night of Alcibiades.” The Hudson Review. 47.1 (Spring 1994). 57–79.
- “The Socratics and the Flight from This World.” Hellas. 8.2 (Fall/Winter 1997). 63–80.
- A Statement on Poetics. Louisiana English Journal. 32 (new series). 1996. 14–15. Three photographs of John Finlay. 12, 17, 18. The Mary Roberts Rinehart Foundation Proposal.

=== Book reviews ===
- “N. Scott Momaday’s Angle of Geese.” Review of Angle of Geese by N. Scott Momaday. The Southern Review 11.3 (Summer 1975). 658–61.
- “Elizabeth Daryush.” Review of Collected Poems by Elizabeth Daryush. The Southern Review 14.2 (Spring 1978). 404–08.
- “Robert Bridges.” Review of In the Classic Mode: The Achievement of Robert Bridges by Donald E. Stanford. PN Review (Manchester, England) 6.6 (1979). 78–79.
- “Dick Davis’ Seeing the World.” Review of Seeing the World by Dick Davis. The Southern Review 17.3 (Summer 1981). 654–56.
- “Grosvenor Powell’s Language as Being.” Review of Language as Being in the Poetry of Yvor Winters by Grosvenor Powell. The Southern Review 17.4 (Autumn 1981). 1001–03.
- “The Poetry of Raymond Oliver.” Review of Entries and To Be Plain by Raymond Oliver, The Southern Review 19.1 (Winter 1983). 178–80.
- “Three from the Symposium.” Review of Witnesses by Edgar Bowers, The Birthday of the Infanta by Janet Lewis, and Many Houses by Charles Gullans. The Southern Review 19.1 (Winter 1983). 181–83.

=== Dissertation ===
- “‘The Unfleshed Eye’: A Study of Intellectual Theism in the Poetry and Criticism of Yvor Winters.” Directed by Donald E. Stanford. Louisiana State University, Baton Rouge, Louisiana, 1980. Now available online.
