= American Civil War reenactment =

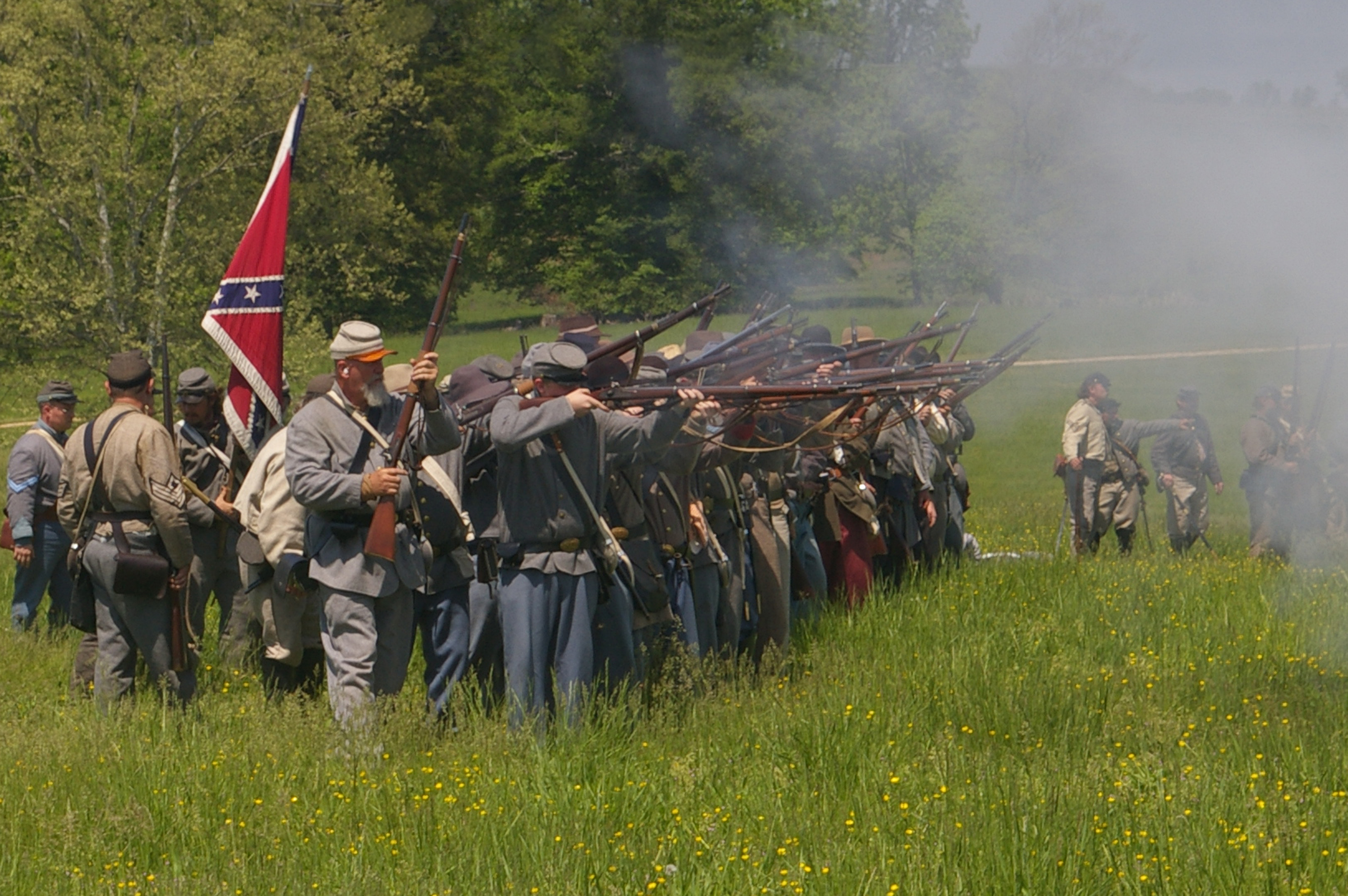
Confederate reenactors fire their rifles during a reenactment of the Battle of Chancellorsville in May 2008.

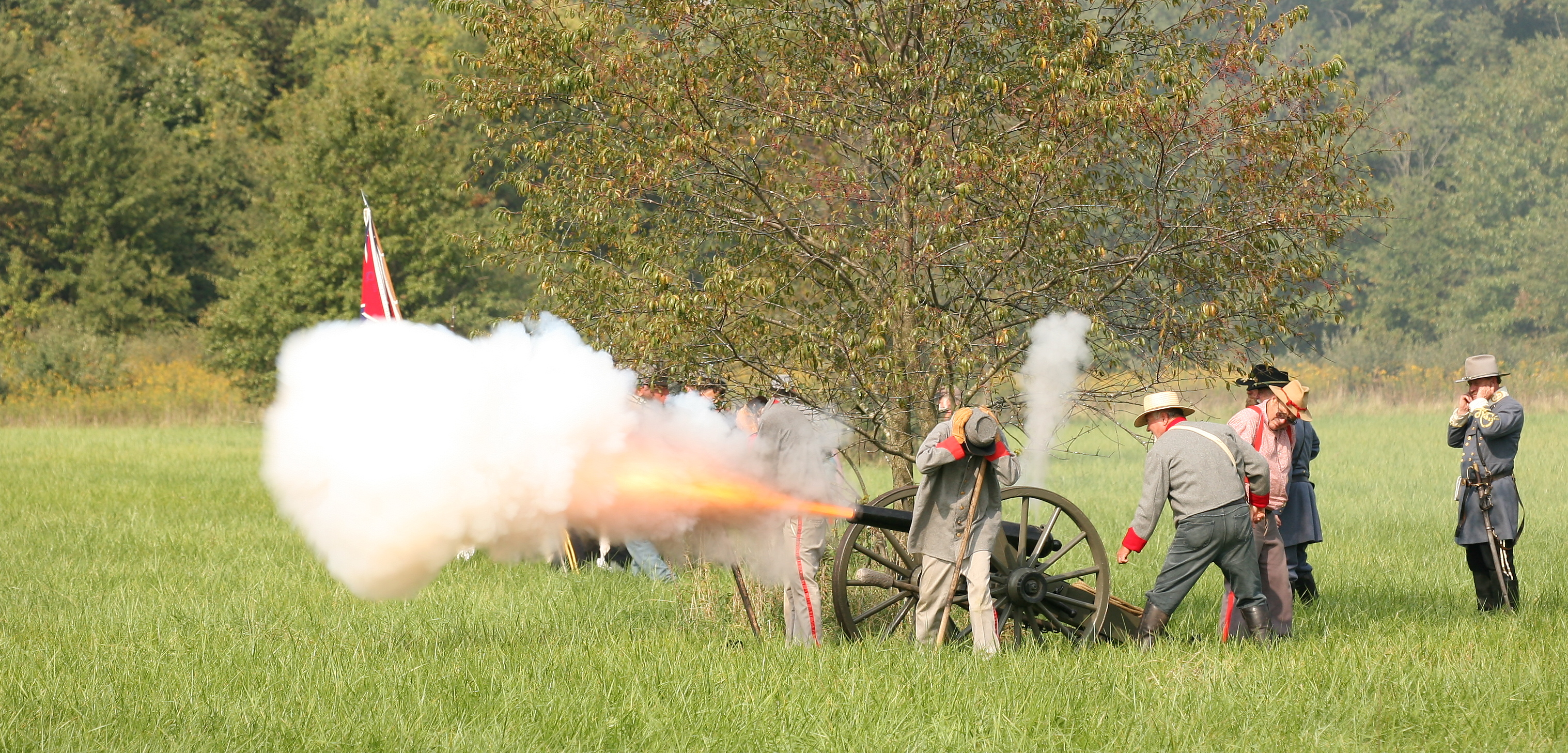
Confederate artillery reenactors fire on Union infantry reenactors during a Battle of Chickamauga reenactment in Danville, Illinois, in September 2008.

American Civil War reenactment is an effort to recreate the appearance of a particular battle or other event associated with the American Civil War by hobbyists known (in the United States) as Civil War reenactors, or living historians.

Although most common in the United States, there are also American Civil War reenactors in Canada, the United Kingdom, Germany, Australia, Italy, Denmark, Sweden, and Poland.

== History ==
Reenacting the American Civil War began even before the actual fighting had ended. American Civil War veterans recreated battles as a way to remember their fallen comrades and to teach others what the war was all about. The Great Reunion of 1913, celebrating the 50th anniversary of the Battle of Gettysburg, was attended by more than 50,000 Union and Confederate veterans, and included reenactments of elements of the battle, including Pickett's Charge. Modern reenacting is thought to have begun during the 1961–1965 American Civil War Centennial commemorations. Reenacting grew in popularity during the 1980s and 1990s, primarily due to the success of the 125th Anniversary reenactment near the original Manassas battlefield, which more than 6,000 reenactors attended. That year, Time magazine estimated there were more than 50,000 reenactors in the U.S.

In 1998, the 135th-anniversary reenactment of the Battle of Gettysburg occurred near the original battlefield. There have been several estimates of the number of participants. Still, it is widely agreed that it was the largest reenactment ever held anywhere in the world, with between 15,000 and 20,000 reenactors participating. About 50,000 spectators watched this event.

== Participation ==
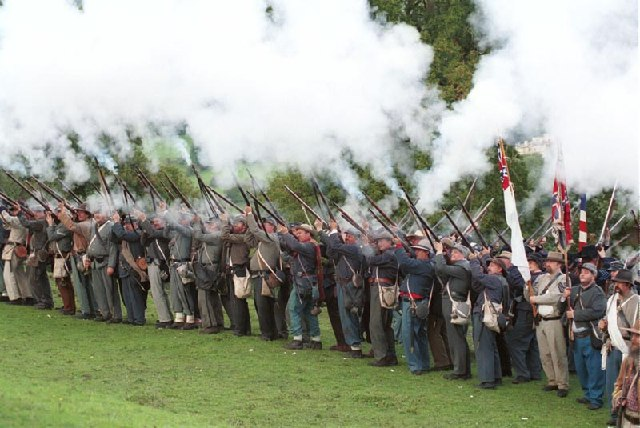
Reenactment at the American Museum in Bath, England

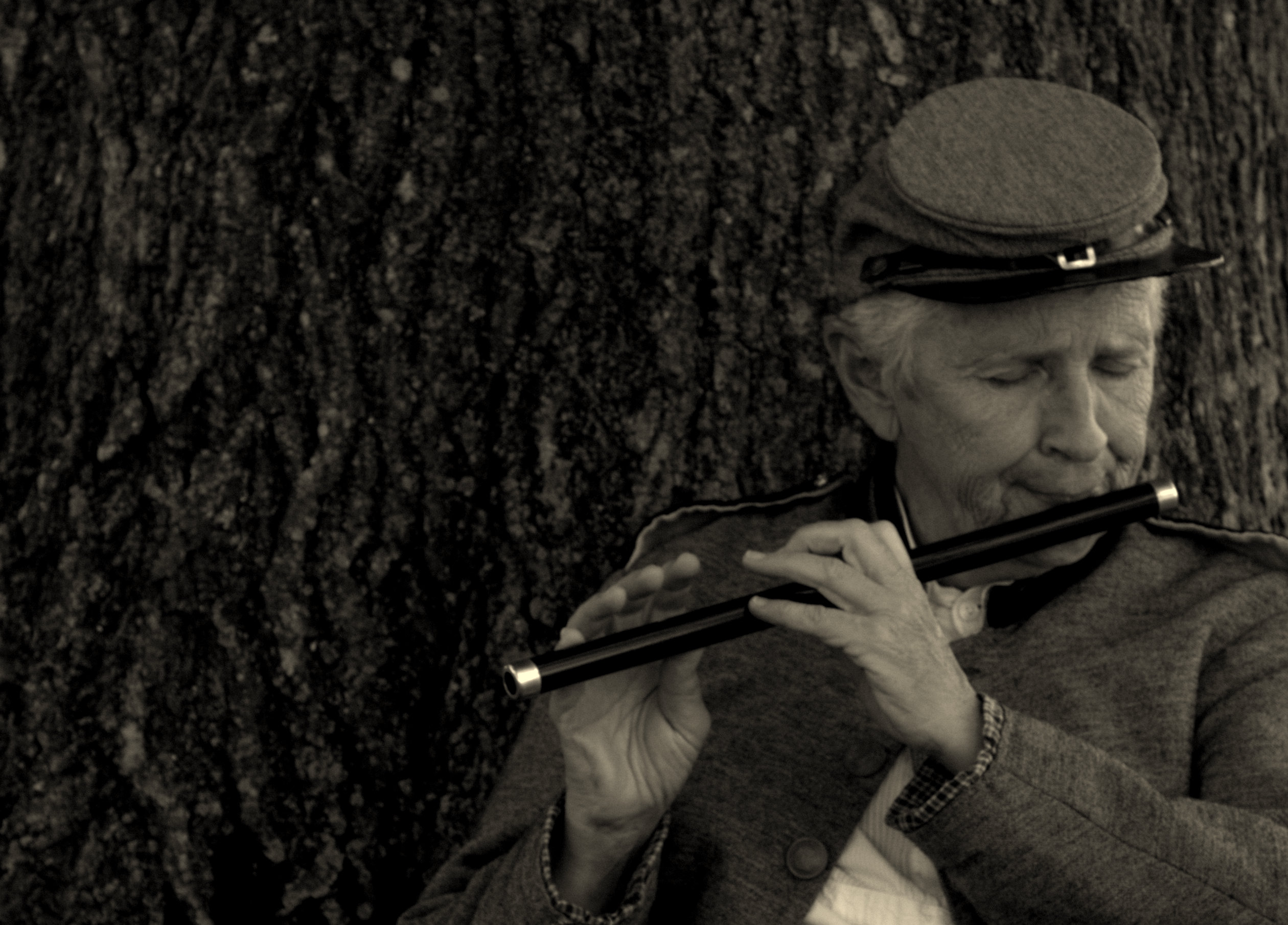
Reenactor plays the fife at The Angle at Gettysburg, Pennsylvania.

American Civil War reenactments have drawn a fairly sizable following of enthusiastic participants, young and old, willing to brave the elements and expend money and resources to duplicate the events down to the smallest recorded detail. Participants may even attend classes by event sponsors where they learn how to dress, cook, eat, and even "die", just as real American Civil War soldiers would have. Most reenactments have anywhere from 100 to thousands of participants, portraying U.S.A. or C.S.A. infantry, artillery, or cavalry forces. Some people, though uncommon, may portray Engineers or Marines. The 135th anniversary Gettysburg reenactment (1998) is generally believed to be the most-attended reenactment, with attendance estimates ranging from 15,000 to over 20,000 reenactors.

Reasons given for participating in such activities vary. Some participants are interested in getting a historical perspective on the turbulent times that gripped the nation, particularly if they can trace their ancestry back to those who fought in the war. In some cases, if there are not enough reenactors on one side, reenactors from the other side are asked to change sides, or "galvanize", for the day/event.

Although many periods are reenacted worldwide, American Civil War reenactment is, by far, the most popular in the US. In 2000, the number of Civil War reenactors was estimated at 50,000, though the number of participants declined sharply through the ensuing decade, to around 30,000 in 2011. Possible reasons for the decline include the cost of participating and the variety of other entertainment options. The 150th anniversary of the war has regenerated interest and stimulated growth in the hobby. The number of reenactors steadily climbed to past levels.

Although women and children commonly participate in reenactments as civilians (portraying, for example, members of a soldiers' aid society), some women also take part in military portrayals. This is controversial within the reenactment community, although there are documented cases of women disguising their gender to fight in the war. Lee Taylor Middleton, the author of "Hearts of Fire: Soldier Women of the American Civil War", has documented hundreds of such female soldiers. DeAnne Blanton and Lauren M. Cook, authors of "They Fought Like Demons: Women Soldiers in the American Civil War", document 240 soldiers in this work. DeAnne Blanton, a Senior Military Archivist at the National Archives in Washington, D.C., is updating her book and believes the number may be closer to seven hundred women. Almost all of the women did so disguised as men. Attitudes on this topic seem to vary widely. Some "hard-core" reenactment units will not admit women; others allow their presence if a real woman soldier is known to have fought in its real-life counterpart regiment; others admit anyone who wants to fight.

=== Categories of reenactors ===
Reenactors are commonly divided (or self-divide) into three categories, based on the level of concern for authenticity.

==== Farbs ====
Some, called "Farbs" or "polyester soldiers" are reenactors who spend relatively little of their time or money maintaining authenticity concerning uniforms, accessories, or even period behavior. The 'Good Enough' attitude is pervasive among farbs, although even casual observers may be able to point out flaws.

==== Mainstream ====
Another group of reenactors often is called "Mainstream." These reenactors are somewhere between farb and progressive. They are more common than either farbs or progressives.

Most mainstream reenactors try to appear authentic but may come out of character without an audience. Visible stitches are likely to be sewn in a period-correct manner, but hidden stitches and undergarments may not be period-appropriate. Food consumed before an audience is expected to be generally appropriate to the early 1860s but may not be seasonally and locally appropriate. Modern items are sometimes used "post battle" or in a hidden fashion. The typical attitude is to put on a good show, but that accuracy need only go as far as others can see.

==== Progressive ====
At the other end of the spectrum from farbs are "hardcore authentics" or "progressives", as they prefer to be called. Sometimes derisively called "stitch counters", many people have misconceptions about hardcore reenactors.

Hardcore authentics generally seek an "immersive" reenacting experience, trying to live as much as possible as someone from the 1860s might have. This includes eating seasonally and regionally appropriate food, undergarments in a period-appropriate manner, and staying in character throughout an event. The desire for an immersive experience often leads hardcore reenactors to smaller events and set up separate camps at larger events, which other reenactors often perceive as elitism.

=== Character reenactors ===
Some reenactors portray a specific officer or person such as General Robert E. Lee, General Ulysses S. Grant, President Abraham Lincoln, Jefferson Davis, or a less well-known officer such as Col. Abram Fulkerson. Character reenactors may also portray a civilian man, woman, or child of significance. These reenactors often do not participate in the actual combat portion of the reenactment and serve as narrators to the audience during the battle. Often, character reenactors have extensively researched the person they portray and present a first-person narrative of his story.

=== Civilian reenactors ===
In addition to military reenactment, a significant part of American Civil War reenactment includes portraying civilians, including men, women, and children from infants to young adults. This can consist of portrayals as diverse as soldiers' aid societies, sutlers, saloon proprietors, musicians, and insurance salespeople.

== Types of Civil War reenactments ==
=== Public events ===
A typical American Civil War reenactment occurs over a weekend, with the reenactors arriving on Friday and camping on site while spectators view the event on Saturday and Sunday. Usually, each reenactment is centered around a Saturday battle and Sunday battle (often, but not always, intended to recreate an actual battle from the American Civil War), in addition to many of the activities listed below. A traditional public reenactment is a three-day affair incorporating elements from the following categories.

==== Living histories ====
Living histories are meant entirely for the education of the public. Such events do not necessarily have a mock battle but instead are aimed at portraying the life, and more importantly, the lifestyle, of the average American Civil War soldier. This does include civilian reenacting, a growing trend. Occasionally, a spy trial is recreated, and a medic too. Warfare and cooking demonstrations, song and leisure activities, and lectures are more common. These should not, however, be confused with Living history museums. These outlets for living history utilize museum professionals and trained interpreters to convey the most accurate information available to historians.

Living history is the only reenactment permitted on National Park Service land; NPS policy "does not allow for battle reenactments (simulated combat with opposing lines and casualties) on NPS property."

==== Public demonstrations ====
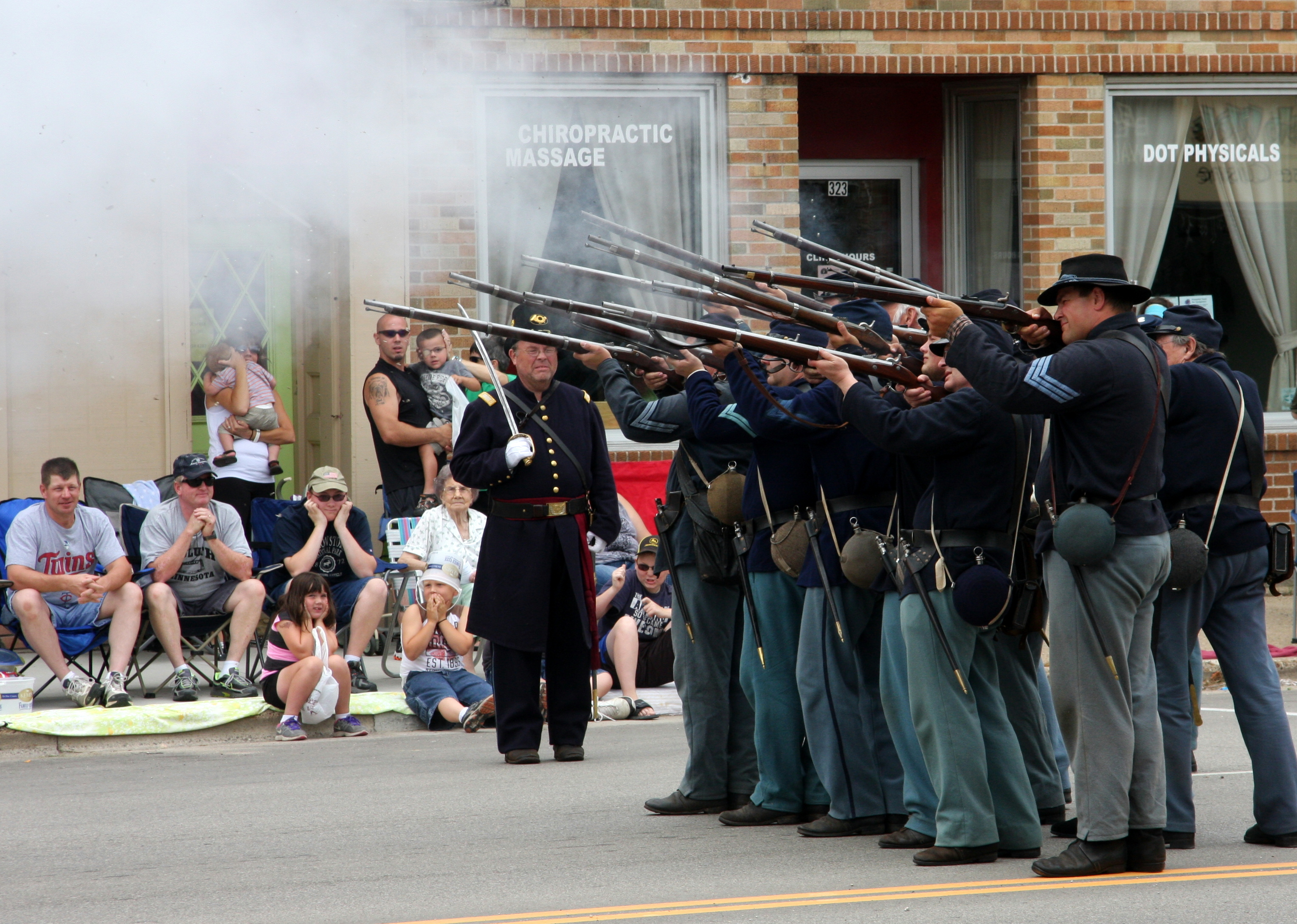
2014 public demonstration in a parade in Plainview, Minnesota

Public demonstrations are smaller mock battles by reenacting organizations or private parties to show the public how people in the 1860s lived and the public American Civil War battles. The battles are only loosely based on actual battles, if at all, and may consist of demonstrations of basic tactics and maneuvering techniques.

==== Scripted battles ====
Scripted battles are reenactments in the strictest sense; the battles are planned so that the companies and regiments take the same actions that were taken in the original battles. They are often fought at or near the battleground or a place similar to the original. Non-reenactors commonly question who "dies" throughout the battle. Reenactors commonly refer to being killed or wounded as "taking a hit" and are typically left up to the individual's discretion, although greatly influenced by the battle's events. Because most battles are based on their historical counterparts, it is generally understood when to begin taking hits and to what extent.

=== Closed events ===
==== Total immersion events ====
Total immersion events are made up solely of progressive ("hard-core authentic") reenactors, who often refer to them as "Events By Us and For Us" or "EBUFU". As the names imply, these events are held for the personal edification of the reenactors involved, allowing them to spend an extended time marching, eating, and generally living like actual soldiers of the American Civil War. Total immersion events generally require participants to meet a high standard of authenticity. In most cases, little or none of the events will be open to public viewing.

==== Tactical battles ====
Tactical battles, which may or may not be open to the public, are fought like real battles, with each side devising strategies and tactics to defeat their opponent(s). They have no script, a basic set of agreed-upon rules (physical boundaries, time limit, victory conditions, etc.), and onsite judges or referees, and so could be considered a form of live action role-playing game. Tactical battles might also be considered a form of experimental archaeology.

== Reenactment and media ==
Motion picture and television producers often turn to reenactment groups for support; films like Gettysburg, Glory, Field of Lost Shoes, and Gods and Generals benefited greatly from the input of reenactors, who arrived on set fully equipped and steeped in knowledge of military procedures, camp life, and tactics.

In a documentary about the making of the film Gettysburg, actor Sam Elliott, who portrayed U.S. Major General John Buford in the film, said of reenactors:

I think we're really fortunate to have those people involved. In fact, they couldn't be making this picture without them; there's no question about that. These guys come with their wardrobe, they come with their weaponry. They come with all the accoutrements, but they also come with the stuff in their head and the stuff in their heart.

However, the relationship between reenactors and filmmakers has been contentious at times. Although reenactors for Gettysburg were unpaid, money was contributed on their behalf to a trust for historic preservation; however, some subsequent productions have offered no such compensation. Also, in some cases, reenactors have clashed with directors over one-sided portrayals and historical inaccuracies. Some producers have been less interested in accuracy than in the sheer number of reenactors, which can result in safety issues. Finally, large film productions, like Gettysburg, can draw enough reenactors to cause the cancellation of other events.

Tony Horwitz covered hardcore reenacting in Confederates In The Attic, released in 1998.

On April 4, 2013, Jeffrey S. Williams released Muskets and Memories: A Modern Man's Journey through the Civil War, a mix of modern reenactment narrative with historical facts.

In 2016, Justin Miller and John Paul Pacelli produced and directed a documentary called When To Die. It followed four Civil War reenactors and explored their relationship with the hobby.

Talene Monahon's 2020 play How to Load a Musket, is about American Civil War reenactors.

== Incidents ==
In 1998, a reenactor at a Battle of Gettysburg recreation borrowed a handgun that contained a "squib" (a bullet lodged halfway down the barrel). Without having inspected the gun before loading the blank charge, the reenactor wounded another in the neck.

== See also ==
- Historical reenactment
- American Civil War
- Cosplay
