= Authenticity (reenactment) =

In historical reenactment, authenticity (sometimes referred to as the A-factor or simply A) is a measure of how close an item, prop, action, weapon, tactic, or custom is to what would actually have been used or done in the time period being depicted. For example, in most northern European medieval reenactment cotton is an inauthentic material—as opposed to wool or linen—though it would be authentic in more modern periods and events, such as American Civil War reenactment or World War II reenactment. Likewise, pop culture references and talking about modern events or objects (e.g., wrist watches, mobile phones, or contemporary politicians) is inauthentic.

Generally, the ratio of events and groups enforcing strict authenticity to those permitting (limited) in authenticity among the participating reenactors is estimated to be half-and-half, i.e., there are approximately as many groups enforcing historical accuracy as there are permitting a more liberal use of the term "authentic". This does, however, vary from country to country.

== Degrees ==
In the US, reenactors are commonly divided (or self-divide) into three categories, based on the level of concern for authenticity.

=== Farbs ===
Some, called "farbs" or "polyester soldiers" are reenactors who spend relatively little of their time or money maintaining authenticity with regard to uniforms, accessories, or even period behavior. A "good enough" attitude is pervasive among farbs, although even casual observers may be able to point out flaws.

The origin of the word "farb" (and the derivative adjective "farby") is unknown, though it appears to date to early centennial reenactments in 1960 or 1961. Some think that the origin of the word is a truncated version of "far be it from authentic." An alternative definition is "far be it for me to question/criticise", or "fast and researchless buying". Some early reenactors assert the word derives from German farbe, color, because inauthentic reenactors were over-colorful compared with the dull blues, greys or browns of the real Civil War uniforms that were the principal concern of American reenactors at the time the word was coined, or the German farbische, manufactured, indicating obviously modern items. According to Mr. Burton K. Kummerow, a member of "The Black Hats, CSA" reenactment group in the early 1960s, he first heard it used as a form of fake German to describe a fellow reenactor. The term was picked up by George Gorman of the 2nd North Carolina at the Centennial Manassas Reenactment in 1961, and has been used by reenactors ever since.

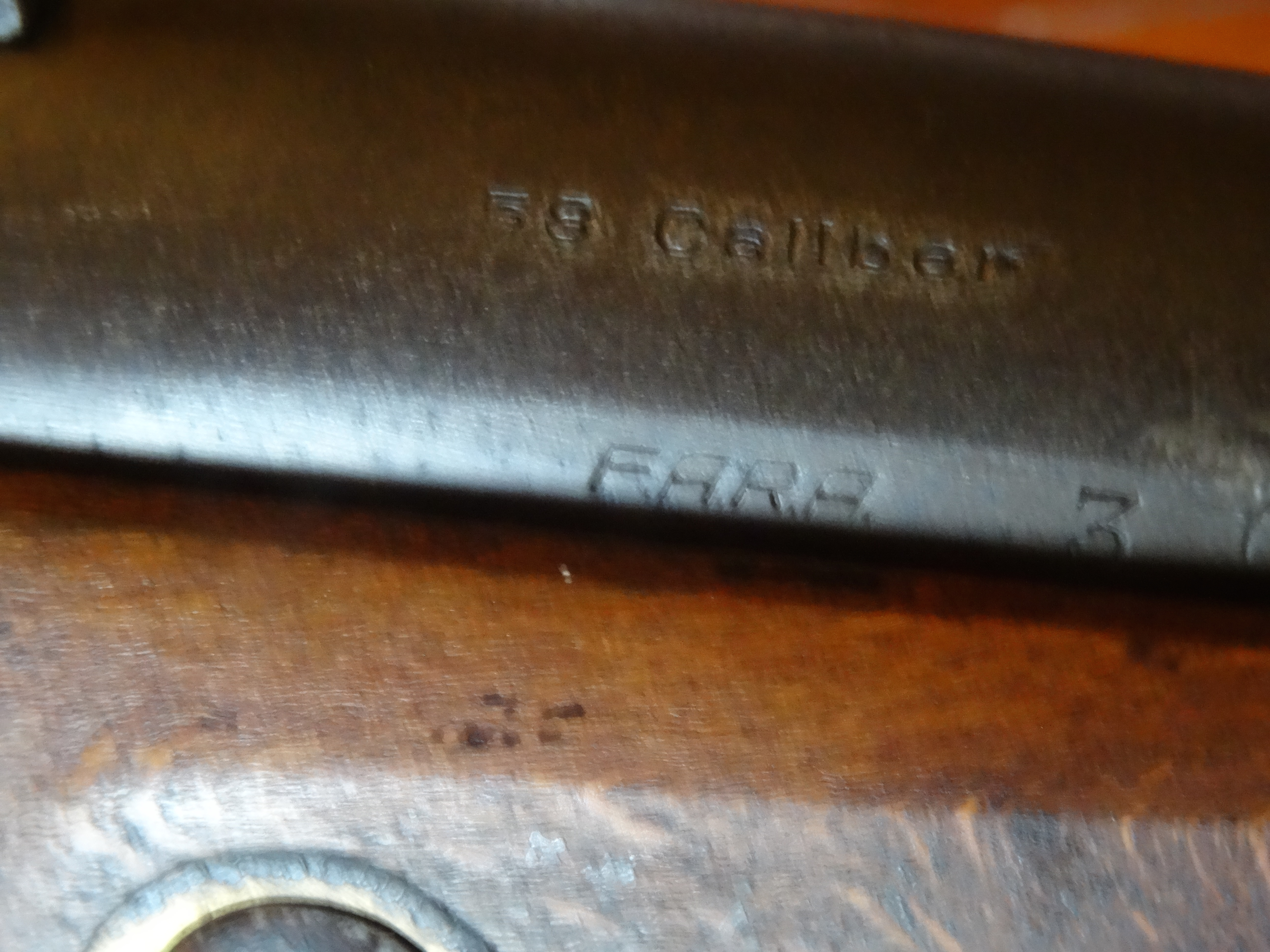
Many of the early replica rifles were marked with what looked like "F.A.R.B" among the proofmarks. Removal of this mark is the origin of the term "defarb".

Many of the early Italian replica rifles were marked with what looked like "F.A.R.B" among the proofmarks. Removal of this would be to defarb, and the term came to cover other objects.

=== Mainstream ===
Another group of reenactors often is called "Mainstream". These reenactors are somewhere between farb and authentic. They are more common than either farbs or authentics.

Most mainstream reenactors make an effort at appearing authentic, but may come out of character in the absence of an audience. Visible stitches are likely to be sewn in a period-correct manner, but hidden stitches and undergarments may not be period-appropriate. Food consumed before an audience is likely to be generally appropriate to the time-period, but it may not be seasonally and locally appropriate. Modern items, such as air mattresses and sleeping bags, are sometimes used "after hours" or in a hidden fashion. The common attitude is to put on a good show, but that accuracy need only go as far as others can see.

=== Progressive ===
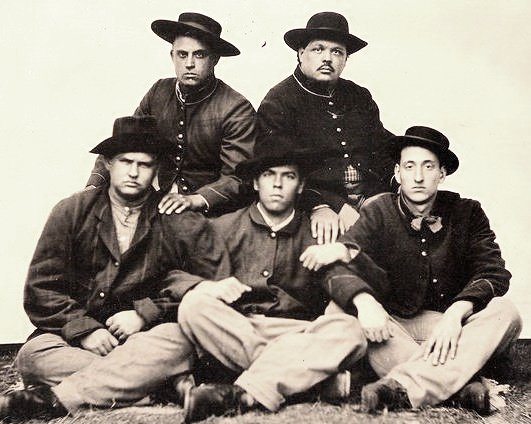
The Liberty Guards Mess, a group of hardcore reenactors, in a Sherman's bummers portrayal.

At the other extreme from farbs are "hard-core authentics" or "progressives," as they prefer to be called, sometimes derisively called "stitch counters". Hard-cores generally seek an "immersive" reenacting experience, trying to live, as much as possible, as someone of their chosen time period might have. This includes eating seasonally and regionally appropriate food, sewing inside seams and undergarments in a period-appropriate manner, and staying in character throughout an event.

Hard-core reenactors generally value thorough research, and sometimes deride mainstream reenactors for perpetuating inaccurate "reenactorisms".

== Historical persona ==
To make their equipment authentic, a reenactor must first decide on the time period, geographic location, and social status they wish to portray. The collection of clothing and equipment is typically called a "kit" and the fictional alter ego is called a "persona". Sometimes when a person has interests that a single persona can't reasonably encompass, for the sake of being authentic, they might create more than one persona. For example, someone might be interested in Norse ("Viking") cultures but also be interested in economics and social history that led to the Landsknecht, and might create two separate personae and kits. They can then choose the persona they will portray according to which hobby they want to do, the location of the reenactment, or the weather (cultures that wore a lot of wool and fur are more popular to reenact in winter than summer).

== Authenticity ==
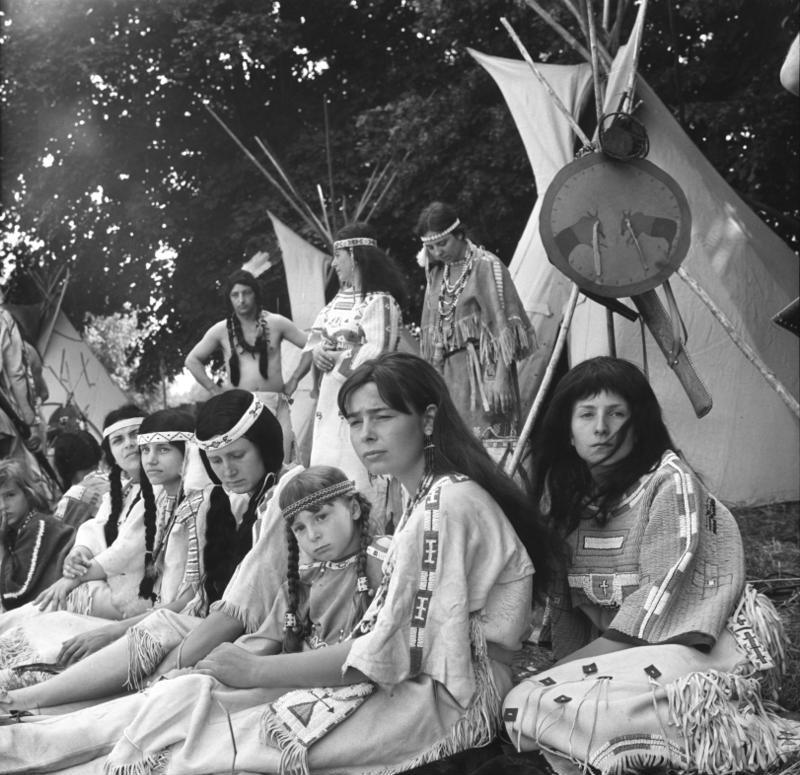
Interessengemeinschaft Mandan-Indianer Leipzig 1970; reenactment of Native Americans was quite popular in communist Eastern Germany

Since authenticity of certain equipment vary between periods and regions, it can be difficult to ensure an entire set or kit of clothing and gear is authentic for a particular historical persona. Most organized societies have recognized norms for kit and garb for their historic and regional specialty. A key philosophy is to research items in advance, vs. buying things and then trying to "fit them in" to the time and place being reenacted. For example, the Vikings are not known to have used plate armour, but some would try to justify it because the earlier Roman Army did. A person might try to pass off an interesting Polish hat by claiming their French persona had traveled to Poland. Such tactics serve to confuse an uneducated audience, however, since many will simply assume that if everyone is portraying Vikings, French pikemen, Prussians grenadiers, etc. that they are also wearing and using items common to that era and people. Authenticity can apply to other things. For example, a card game, song, or military tactic is authentic if known to be used during the period.

The quest for authentic clothes and equipment often requires archaeological evidence, archival research, and other historical sources that reveal what was used at the time. A reenactor may become an amateur historian (or even a professional historian) in pursuit of evidence and sources to create an accurate persona. Many time periods of reenactment have online discussion boards where reenactors and historians discuss the merits of various items, how to make them, or where to purchase them.

Several factors commonly limit the attainable level of authenticity. These include:

- Safety considerations
- Climate/weather
- Available information
- Cost in money and/or time

The German approach of authenticity (reenactment) is less about replaying a certain event, but to allow an immersion in a certain era. Historic city festivals and events are quite important to build up local communities and contribute to the self-image of municipalities. Events in monuments or on historical sites are less about the events related to them but as mere staffage for the immersion experience.

== Enforcement ==
The strictness with which authenticity is enforced varies widely with different events and groups. While some consider only documented historical use to be authentic, and ban all inauthentic gear and behaviour from reenactment activities, others permit materials that plausibly could have existed, others permit inauthentic materials that can't be seen by the public, and still others only require that "it has to look authentic from 10 meters away" (i.e. from a distant audience's perspective).

Similarly, many groups permit equipment combined from a wider range of centuries than what could be considered historically accurate (e.g. 12th century soldiers wearing barbute helmets). This sometimes results from safety rules that require protective gauntlets and helmets, even when this interferes with historical accuracy.

In addition to mixing multiple centuries of a general period in a single event (usually to ensure a larger number of participants), some events feature more than a single period, especially if the event strongly focuses on combat displays or battles. In such cases, it is not unusual that the same reenactor participates in more than one show, sometimes with only slightly altered gear (depending on how strictly authenticity is enforced). A typical example is a clankie (a reenactor in full plate armour) removing his armour, picking up a round shield and participating in a Dark Age battle.

Many groups, especially in medieval reenactment, heavily promote the use of "market speech", i.e., talking in a way that sounds appropriate for the period. Inauthentic equipment and behaviour is often referred to via descriptive phrases like "pocket dragon" (for a lighter or box of matches) and "horseless carriage" (for a car or other engine-powered vehicle) to circumvent strict enforcement of authentic speech. Other groups expect reenactors to stay fully in-character throughout an event, and refrain from commenting on non-period items. To adequately explain activities to an audience, many such groups designate one or two people as "interpreters" who can step out of character to discuss things from a modern perspective.

Other ways to circumvent the need for authentic equipment include "hiding" plastic bottles (usually by wrapping them in cloths or furs), using "bindings" (long straps of cloth or fur) to make inauthentic footgear look more adequate, or simply hiding coolboxes inside wooden chests.

For safety and comfort, authenticity is usually restricted to designated public areas, thus allowing for the use of portable toilets and inauthentic tenting by reenactors outside these areas.

A typical issue among strictly authentic reenactors is the inclusion of female combatants, as this is a clash between authenticity (there were no female combatants in most reenacted periods) and modern concepts of sexual equality.

Similarly, some groups enforce authentic hairstyles (e.g., 20th century soldiers are usually not expected to wear long hair or beards) and often (inauthentic) jewelry is not permitted — although in combat reenactment this is often more of a safety issue than a question of authenticity.

== See also ==
- Living history
- Historically informed performance, reenactment or reconstruction of historical music
