= Blue Latitudes =

Travel book by Tony Horwitz

Blue Latitudes/Boldly Going Where Captain Cook Has Gone Before
- First edition
- Author: Tony Horwitz
- Language: English
- Subject: James Cook
- Genre: Travel and History
- Publisher: Henry Holt and Company
- Publication date: 2002
- Media type: Hardcover, Paperback, Audiobook, E-Book
- Pages: 480
- ISBN: 978-0-312-42260-8

Blue Latitudes: Boldly Going Where Captain Cook Has Gone Before (United States), or Into the Blue: Boldly Going Where Captain Cook Has Gone Before (Australia), is a travel book by Tony Horwitz, published in 2002.

In it, the Pulitzer Prize–winning journalist travels to various parts of the world, following in the footsteps of explorer James Cook. The book compares the current conditions of the places Cook visited to what Cook documented at the time, and describes the different legacies Cook has left behind.

Horwitz begins with his experience as a volunteer deckhand on the replica of HM Bark Endeavour. Some of the places Horwitz visits in his travels include Australia, the small island nation of Niue, the Society Islands, Tonga, New Zealand, the birthplace and home of Cook in North Yorkshire England, Alaska, and Hawaii.
