= Shiloh (Foote novel) =

1952 historical novel by Shelby Foote

Shiloh: A Novel
- First edition
- Author: Shelby Foote
- Cover artist: H. Lawrence Hoffman
- Language: English
- Genre: Historical War novel
- Publisher: The Dial Press (US)
- Publication date: 1952
- Publication place: United States
- Media type: Print (hardback & paperback)
- Pages: 226 pp
- ISBN: 978-0-679-73542-7

Shiloh: A Novel is a historical novel set during the American Civil War, written in 1952 by Shelby Foote. It employs the first-person perspectives of several protagonists, Union and Confederate, to give a moment-by-moment depiction of the 1862 Battle of Shiloh.

== Plot summary and characters ==
Because the novel is divided into chapters, each closely concerned with one of the characters, a summary of the story serves as a character analysis as well.

Chapter One takes place the day before the battle; it is narrated by Lieutenant Palmer Metcalfe, a cocky, 19 year old, aristocrat from New Orleans and a staff officer under Confederate commander Albert Sidney Johnston. He watches as the Confederate army marches through the Tennessee countryside in preparation for a surprise attack upon the Union troops at Pittsburg Landing. His self-satisfaction is evident as he remembers the complicated attack plan he helped draft, and as he thinks back on the struggles Johnston went through in bringing his army together for this decisive blow. The Confederate troops are inexperienced and noisy, and some of Johnston's generals believe the element of surprise has been lost. Johnston, however, insists on fighting whatever the conditions.

Chapter Two is the story of Captain Walter Fountain, an Ohio regimental adjutant in the Union Army encamped at Pittsburg Landing. He is the Officer of the Day and whiles away the Tennessee night by writing a letter to his wife, Martha. Through his thoughts, the reader learns about the Union army's slow but steady advance through Tennessee under the resolute leadership of Ulysses Grant. Fountain is homesick but confident that the war will be over soon. He interacts with the regimental mascot, a dog named Bango. As he commits his feelings and hopes to paper, he begins to notice that the birds and other woodland creatures have become noisier and more agitated. Suddenly hundreds of Confederate soldiers burst out of the forest, charging headlong upon Fountain and the other unsuspecting Union troops. The chapter ends abruptly, and the reader assumes that Fountain is killed in the initial assault.

Chapter Three comes from the perspective of Private Luther Dade, a humble rifleman from Mississippi. He is frightened but determined to do his duty as his regiment prepares to join the battle. When the fight does come, Dade is disturbed when he realizes that the mangled corpses of old friends mean no more to him than those of strangers; the new horrors of the day are too much for him to process. He does well in combat but sustains a minor arm wound and is sent to a triage area to wait for a doctor. Hours pass, no doctor shows up, and Dade's arm begins to show signs of infection. He stumbles toward the sound of firing in search of medical attention and soon finds himself in a clearing near Shiloh Church. Others are there; Johnston's staff, gathered around their wounded and dying commander. Dade is transfixed by the drama of the scene, even as he begins to pass out from his wound.

Chapter Four is narrated by Private Otto Flickner, a Minnesota artilleryman. It is the first night of the battle, and Flickner is cowering at the riverbank with hundreds of other deserters. He rationalizes his actions by claiming, "I'm not scared, I'm just what they call demoralized." His search for justification leads him to remember the days events: the shattering surprise attack, one failed attempt after another to stand and fight, the endless concussions of oncoming enemy shells, and finally his running away because "so much is enough but a little bit more is too much." He and the other deserters are jeered at and called cowards by some reinforcements that pass by; their words force Flickner to realize that a coward is exactly what he has been. Without any real conscious effort, he finds himself leaving the riverbank and wandering through the woods looking for his unit. Almost miraculously, he comes upon them getting ready for one last stand. His sergeant, who witnessed his desertion, greets him as if nothing had happened and directs him back to his old gun.

Chapter Five concerns Sergeant Jefferson Polly, a Texas cavalryman serving under Nathan Bedford Forrest. A former seminary student and soldier of fortune, Polly joined the army by reasoning, "I wasn't any better at being a bad man than I was a good one." His mature and cynical perspective tells him that the Confederate army, even though successful on the first day, is fighting a poorly planned and badly coordinated battle. That night, Forrest leads Polly and his squad on a reconnaissance mission to Pittsburg Landing. While there, they see thousands of Union reinforcements disembarking from steamboats; more men in themselves than are left in the whole Confederate army. Forrest and Polly try to alert the high command to the new danger, but fail in the face of confusion and red tape. With the next sunrise, Polly resigns himself to a day of defeat beside his beloved commander.

Chapter Six focuses on an Indiana squad from the command of General Lew Wallace. The reader hears from all the twelve members in turn as they tell of their efforts to reach the battlefield, the wrong turn that delayed them for a day, and the scorn that was poured on them by other troops for their tardiness. When the battle's second day dawns, the Hoosiers and the rest of Wallace's division are at the forefront of the resurgent Federal assault. At the end of the fight, two of the Hoosiers are dead; the survivors wonder if they have any right to ask why they lived and the others did not.

Chapter Seven returns to Lieutenant Metcalfe as he stumbles down the road to Corinth, just after the defeat of the Confederate army. He remembers the dramatic death of General Johnston: how events spun out of control in its aftermath, how the disorganized and leaderless Confederate army fell victim to a surprise Federal attack the next day, how Johnston's old-fashioned chivalry had been no match for the reality they had encountered. In the confusion of the retreat he falls in with Forrest and Polly and participates in their valiant rearguard action at Fallen Timbers. Metcalfe decides to join Forrest's unit as an enlisted man; he now believes that any hope the Confederacy has lies with men like Forrest rather than men like Johnston.

The novel ends with Metcalfe tending to a delirious amputee in a wagon; the reader knows him to be Luther Dade.

== Style and substance ==
The book owes much to William Faulkner in the slow, elegant cadence of its storytelling. Its narrative also resembles Stephen Crane's The Red Badge of Courage; a similarity reinforced by the fact that Foote wrote an introduction to an edition of Crane's work some forty years later.

The story illustrates two of Foote's most strongly held convictions: that Nathan Bedford Forrest was the greatest combat commander in the American Civil War, and that Confederate society held the seeds of its own doom.
