= Chandra Manning =

American historian

- Education: Harvard; National University of Ireland, Galway; Mount Holyoke College
- Occupations: Author, historian
- Writing career
- Language: English
- Subject: 19th century U.S. history
- Notable awards: Avery O. Craven Award

Chandra Manning is an American historian who specializes in 19th century U.S. History. A graduate of Mount Holyoke College, Manning went on to receive her Ph.D. from Harvard in 2002. She is a professor of history at Georgetown University. Manning has written several articles that have appeared in various journals and books, and is the author of the books What This Cruel War Was Over and Troubled Refuge: Struggling for Freedom in the Civil War.

== Education ==
Chandra attended Mount Holyoke College where she received her B.A. summa cum laude, in history. She then attended the National University of Ireland, Galway where she received an M.Phil in Irish history and literature. She would later go on to receive her Ph.D. in History from Harvard.

== Career and personal life ==
Manning is currently a full professor of history at Georgetown University where she has taught since 2005. In 2015-2017 she took leave from Georgetown University to serve as Special Advisor to the Dean of the Radcliffe Institute for Advance Study at Harvard University. Prior to joining the faculty at Georgetown Prof. Manning was an assistant professor at Pacific Lutheran University in Tacoma, Washington. She has also lectured in history at Harvard University.

She splits her time between Georgetown and in Braintree, Massachusetts where she lives with her husband and two sons.

== Published work ==
Manning published her most recent book, Troubled Refuge: Struggling for Freedom in the Civil War in 2016. Drawing on a wealth of military records, letters, and diaries the book examines the relationship between African Americans and the federal government forged in the contraband camps, which were refugee camps for escaped slaves. That relationship, which lasted beyond the war, would help destroy slavery, foreclose it reestablishment, while also redefining American citizenship in ways that are still with us today. Manning's first book, What This Cruel War Was Over was published in 2007 and focuses on the American Civil War. The book examines how soldiers on both sides of the war perceived slavery, and how this contentious issue may have influenced their ideas about the war and its purpose. Manning studied Union and Confederate soldiers' accounts in order to explain and understand why slavery defined the soldier's thinking about the war.

Manning has also written over a dozen articles published in both books and journals, such as North and South, Journal of the Civil War, The Chronicle of Higher Education, and the Journal of American History.

== Awards ==
Manning's Trouble Refuge: Struggling for Freedom in the Civil War has been reviewed positively in publications such as the Wall Street Journal. The work was awarded the Jefferson Davis Prize and was a finalist for the Lincoln Prize. What This Cruel War Was Over has received many positive reviews. For this work, she was awarded the Avery O. Craven Award by the Organization of American Historians in 2007. She has also received honorable mention in the Lincoln Prize, the Jefferson Davis Prize, and in the Virginia Literary Award in Nonfiction competitions.
