= 19th century in the United States =

The 19th century in the United States refers to the period in the United States from 1801 through 1900 in the Gregorian calendar. For information on this period, see:

- History of the United States series:
  - History of the United States (1789–1849)
  - History of the United States (1849–1865)
  - History of the United States (1865–1918)
- Historical eras:
  - Jeffersonian era
  - Era of Good Feelings
  - Jacksonian era
  - American Civil War
  - Reconstruction era
  - Gilded Age
  - Progressive Era
