= Charles Gullans =

American poet

- Born: Charles Bennett Gullans; May 5, 1929; Minneapolis, Minnesota, US
- Died: March 30, 1993 (aged 63); Los Angeles, California, US
- Occupations: Author, professor
- Known for: Arrivals and Departures

Charles Gullans (May 5, 1929 – March 30, 1993) was an American poet, bibliographer, and educator. His first book, Arrivals and Departures (University of Minnesota Press, 1962), was his most critically acclaimed publication. He published five more poetry collections during his life. He also published translations including Last Letters from Stalingrad and The Wrong Side of the Rug, and compiled bibliographies of the works of Sir Robert Ayton and J V Cunningham.

== Life ==
Charles Bennett Gullans was born in Minneapolis, Minnesota. He earned a bachelor's degree in 1948 and master's degree in 1951 from the University of Minnesota. He completed a doctorate at Stanford University in 1956. He taught briefly at the University of Washington, after which he returned to California. He spent nearly his entire career as a professor of English at the University of California at Los Angeles.

Gullans died at UCLA Medical Center of respiratory failure after undergoing surgery for cancer.

== Poetry collections ==
- Arrivals and Departures. University of Minnesota Press. 1962. OCLC 1445522.
- Many Houses. Symposium Press. 1981. OCLC 3365904.
- Under Red Skies. Robert L. Barth. 1983. ISBN 0941150097. OCLC 3677696.
- The bright universe and other poems. Abattoir Editions. 1983. ISBN 9780936576107. OCLC 9689356.
- Local Winds. Robert L. Barth. 1985. OCLC 5088127.
- Letter from Los Angeles. John Daniel & Co. 1990. ISBN 0936784792. OCLC 22648007.
- The Trees. Robert L. Barth. 1995. OCLC 36552613.

== Translations ==
- Schneider, Franz; Gullens, Charles (1974). Last letters from Stalingrad. Westport, Conn.: Greenwood Press. ISBN 9780837172408. OCLC 1104427617.
- Gullans, Charles (1986). The wrong side of the rug: cross-setting. Florence, Ky.: Robert L. Barth. ISBN 9780941150569. OCLC 8337008.

== Bibliographies ==
- The English and Latin poems of Sir Robert Ayton. Society by W. Blackwood. 1963. OCLC 3856218720.
- Bibliography of the Published Works of J V Cunningham, 1931-1988. University of California Press. 1973. OCLC 3711558.
- Margaret Armstrong and American trade bindings. University Research Library, University of California, Los Angeles. 1991. OCLC 28384975.

== External sources ==
- Stuart A. Rose Manuscript, Archives, and Rare Book Library
