= Tony Horwitz =

American journalist and author (1958–2019)

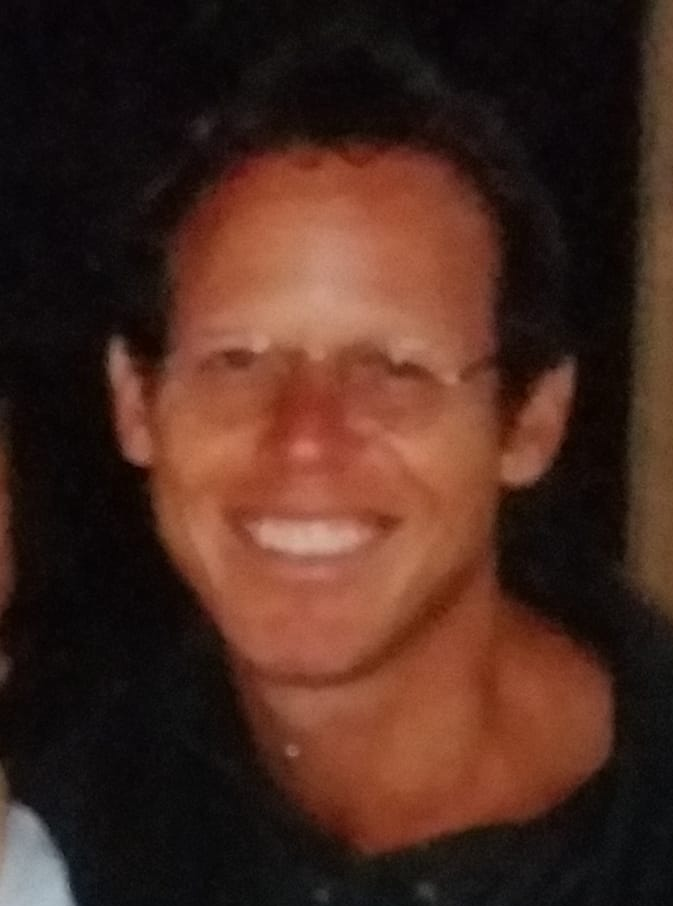
- Horwitz in 2002
- Born: Anthony Lander Horwitz; June 9, 1958; Washington, D.C., U.S.
- Died: May 27, 2019 (aged 60); Washington, D.C., U.S.
- Education: Brown University (BA); Columbia University (MA)
- Occupations: Journalist, writer
- Spouse: Geraldine Brooks (m. 1984)
- Children: 2
- Writing career
- Genres: Non-fiction, travel and description, military history, biography
- Subjects: Civil War, maritime discoveries
- Notable awards: 1994 James Aronson Award, 1995 Pulitzer Prize for National Reporting

Signature
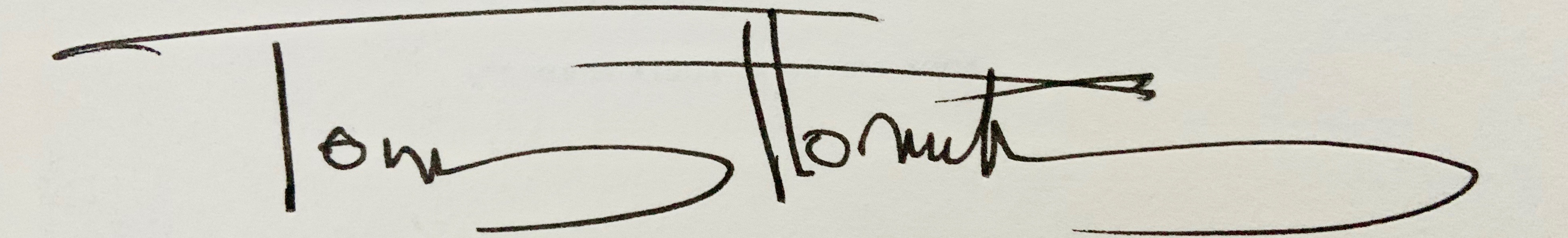

Anthony Lander Horwitz (June 9, 1958 – May 27, 2019) was an American journalist and author, widely known for his articles and books on subjects including American history and society. He won the 1995 Pulitzer Prize for National Reporting.

His books include One for the Road: a Hitchhiker's Outback (1987), Baghdad Without a Map (1991), Confederates in the Attic (1998), Blue Latitudes (AKA Into the Blue) (2002), A Voyage Long and Strange: Rediscovering the New World (2008), Midnight Rising: John Brown and the Raid That Sparked the Civil War (2011), and Spying on the South: An Odyssey Across the American Divide (2019).

== Early life and education ==
He was born in Washington, D.C., the son of Norman Harold Horwitz, a neurosurgeon, and Elinor Lander Horwitz, a writer. Horwitz was an alumnus of Sidwell Friends School, in Washington, D.C. He graduated Phi Beta Kappa as a history major from Brown University and received a master's degree at the Columbia University Graduate School of Journalism.

== Writing career ==
Horwitz won a 1994 James Aronson Award and the 1995 Pulitzer Prize for National Reporting for his stories about working conditions in low-wage America published in The Wall Street Journal. He also worked as a staff writer for The New Yorker and as a foreign correspondent covering conflicts in Africa, Europe, and the Middle East.

He documented his venture into e-publishing and reaching best-seller status in that venue in an opinion article for The New York Times.

In 2019 he began writing and lecturing for the Gertrude Polk Brown Lecture Series at The Filson Historical Society. His book Spying on the South: An Odyssey Across the American Divide focuses on the early New York Times journalist and correspondent Frederick Law Olmsted's travels through the American South from 1852 to 1857.

He was a fellow at the Radcliffe College Center of Advanced Study and a past president of the Society of American Historians. In 2020 it established the Tony Horwitz Prize honoring distinguished work in American history of wide appeal and enduring public significance.

== Personal life ==
Horwitz married the Australian writer Geraldine Brooks in France in 1984. They had two children. His son Nathaniel Horwitz co-founded Hunterbrook and Mayday Health.

== Death ==
On May 27, 2019, Horwitz collapsed while walking in Chevy Chase, Maryland. He was taken to George Washington University Hospital, the same hospital where he was born, and pronounced dead; the cause was cardiac arrest due to myocarditis. He was in the midst of a book tour for Spying on the South.

== Bibliography ==
- One for the Road: a Hitchhiker's Outback. Harper & Row Publishers. 1987. ISBN 978-0063120952. OCLC 26195613.
- Baghdad Without A Map. Angus & Robertson. 1991. ISBN 978-0-207-17168-0.
- Confederates in the Attic. Pantheon Books. 1998. ISBN 978-0-679-43978-3.
- Blue Latitudes: Boldly Going Where Captain Cook Has Gone Before. Macmillan. 2002. ISBN 978-0-8050-6541-1. OCLC 49626343.; British edition: Into the Blue: Boldly Going Where Captain Cook Has Gone Before. Bloomsbury Publishing. 2002. ISBN 978-0-7475-6455-3.
- The Devil May Care: 50 Intrepid Americans and Their Quest for the Unknown. Oxford University Press. 2003. ISBN 978-0-19-516922-5. OCLC 52477250.
- A Voyage Long and Strange: Rediscovering the New World. Henry Holt. 2008. ISBN 978-0-8050-7603-5. OCLC 180989602.
- Midnight Rising: John Brown and the Raid That Sparked the Civil War. Henry Holt. 2011. ISBN 978-0-8050-9153-3. OCLC 697267337.
- BOOM: Oil, Money, Cowboys, Strippers, and the Energy Rush That Could Change America Forever. Amazon Digital Services. 2014.
- Spying on the South: An Odyssey Across the American Divide. Penguin Press. 2019.
