= Clifford Dowdey =

American novelist

- Born: January 23, 1904; Richmond, Virginia, U.S.
- Died: May 30, 1979 (aged 75)
- Education: Columbia University
- Occupations: Journalist, novelist
- Writing career
- Genres: Historical fiction and history

Clifford Dowdey (January 23, 1904 – May 30, 1979) was an American writer of fiction and nonfiction dealing with the American South, Virginia and especially the Civil War era.

== Early life and education ==
Clifford Dowdey was born in Richmond, Virginia January 23, 1904. His father, who worked for Western Union, was descended from immigrants surnamed O'Dowda of County Galway, Ireland. His mother, a housewife, could trace her ancestors to an English settler of Jamestown. His grandmother lived with his family until she died when Dowdey was age 19. Four of her brothers had been Confederate soldiers, and her reminiscences spurred his lifelong interest in the American Civil War and Virginia history. Dowdey graduated from John Marshall High School in Richmond, then traveled to New York City to attend Columbia University from 1921 to 1925.

== Career ==
Following graduation, Dowdey worked for about a year as a newspaper reporter and book reviewer for the Richmond News Leader. Returning to New York City, he worked for the Brooklyn Daily Eagle, then as an editor for various pulp magazines (Munsey's, Argosy and Dell) from 1926 to around 1935. About 1933 he started writing seriously on what eventually would become his first novel, Bugles Blow No More (1937), a love story set in Confederate Richmond. It received acclaim for its realistic detail, and Dowdey began a lengthy correspondence with Margaret Mitchell, whose Gone with the Wind had been published the previous year. Leaving the magazines and accepting a Guggenheim fellowship, he and his wife moved to Florida for a season, but his next four novels (three set in Virginia) received less acclaim. During the 1940s, Dowdey lived in various states, including Connecticut, Florida, Arizona and California, writing screenplays.

In 1945 Dowdey returned to Richmond, Virginia and finished Experiment in Rebellion, his first nonfiction book, which proved another turning point in his career. The book focused on the administration of Confederate President Jefferson Davis and became an initial choice of the History Book Club. His The Land They Fought For (1955), about the nullification crisis of 1832 through the Civil War became a finalist for the 1956 National Book Award.

For the rest of his life, Dowdey lived in Richmond and worked as a writer of historical fiction and history, the city's first vocational writer since Edgar Allan Poe. Both progressive and liberal, Dowdey fought idealization of the Southern past, while also declaring that the region could not be understood without respecting its history. In 1958, Virginia's governor J. Lindsay Almond appointed Dowdey to Virginia's Civil War Centennial Commission, but after that event, he had difficulty getting his works about the conflict published. Thus, his last two books were about Virginia's colonial oligarchy in the 17th and 18th centuries.

Dowdey also reviewed others' historical works in academic journals, such as The Journal of Southern History and The Virginia Magazine of History and Biography. Even though he had no formal training as an historian and used few if any footnotes, several of his works received critical acclaim by noted historians. Ripon College awarded Dowdey an honorary LL.D. in 1961, and Virginia's governor Linwood Holton in September 1972 honored him and 34 other Virginians for their contributions to arts and the humanities. Dowdey's historical novels were popular and reviewed in The New York Times.

== Death and legacy ==
Dowdey died in Richmond on May 30, 1979, from complications of emphysema and lung cancer. The University of Virginia holds Dowdey's papers at the Albert and Shirley Small Special Collections Library.

== Family life ==
In 1930, Dowdey married Katherine Wright Carrington, a New York stage actress, but they divorced before 1934. On July 13, 1944, Dowdey married Frances Wilson, a clinical psychologist; she died July 1970. He was the father of two daughters, Frances and Sarah. Later on 9 September 1971 he married a third time, to Carolyn DeCamps, a librarian with Chesterfield County, Virginia.

== Publications ==
=== Novels ===
- Bugles Blow No More. Boston: Little, Brown & Co., 1937.
- Gamble's Hundred. Boston: Little Brown & Co., 1939.
- Sing for a Penny. Boston: Little Brown & Co., 1941.
- Tidewater. Boston: Little, Brown & Co., 1943.
- Where My Loves Sleeps. Boston: Little, Brown & Co., 1945.
- Weep for My Brother. Garden City, N. Y.: Doubleday, 1950.
- Jasmine Street. Garden City, N. Y.: Doubleday, 1952.
- The Proud Retreat: A Novel of the Lost Confederate Treasure. Garden City, N. Y.: Doubleday, 1953.
- Last Night the Nightingale. Garden City, N. Y.: Doubleday, 1962.

=== Historical works ===
- Experiment in Rebellion. Garden City, N.Y.: Doubleday, 1946.
- The Land They Fought for: Story of the South as the Confederacy, 1832 -1865. Garden City, N.Y.: Doubleday, 1955.
- The Great Plantation: A Profile of Berkeley Hundred and Plantation Virginia from Jamestown to Appomattox. New York: Rinehart, 1957.
- Death of a Nation: The story of Lee and His Men at Gettysburg. New York: A. A. Knopf, 1958.
- Lee's Last Campaign: The Story of Lee and His Men Against Grant - 1864. University of Nebraska Press, 1960.
- Ed., Wartime Papers of R. E. Lee. Boston: Little Brown and Company, 1961.
- The Seven Days: The Emergence of Lee. Boston: Little Brown & Co., 1964.
- Lee. Boston: Little Brown & Co., 1965.
- The Virginia Dynasties: The Emergence of 'King' Carter and the Golden Age. Boston: Little Brown & Co., 1969.
- The Golden Age: A Climate for Greatness, Virginia 1732-1775. Boston: Little Brown & Co., 1970.

== See also ==
- Taylor, W. D. "Virginia Authors Past and Present." 1972.
- New York Times 13 July 1941.
