= Hudson Strode =

American author and academic

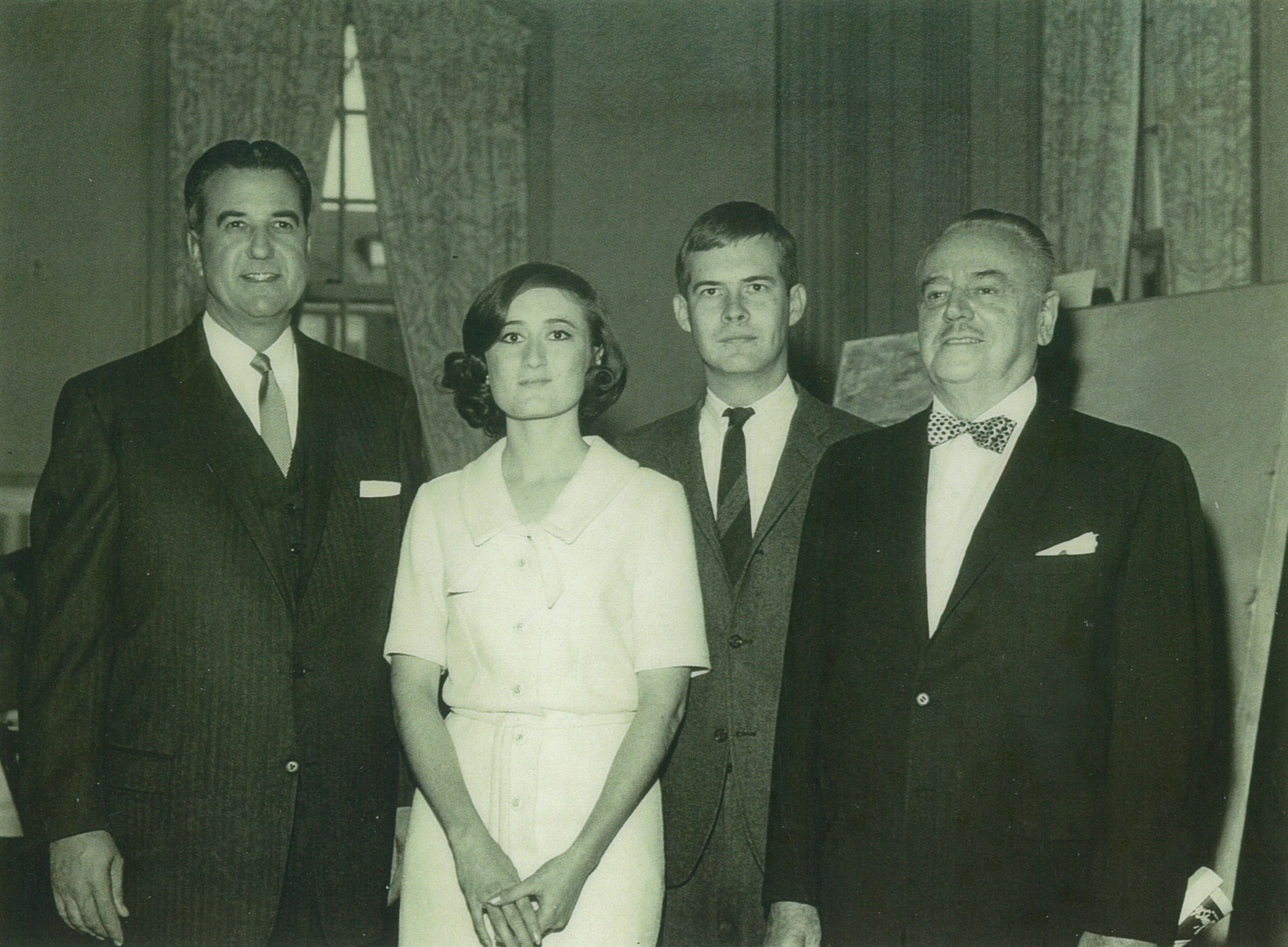
John Martin Finlay (right) and Professor Hudson Strode (far right) circa 1965

Hudson Strode (October 31, 1892 – September 22, 1976) was an author and professor of creative writing at the University of Alabama. He taught at the University of Alabama from 1916 until his retirement in 1963. His creative writing classes gained international fame for the literary successes achieved by his students. Strode's students published over 55 novels and 101 short stories.

== Early life and education ==
Strode was born in Cairo, Illinois, but moved to Demopolis, Alabama at the age of twelve. He received his undergraduate degree from the University of Alabama in 1913, and a Master of Arts degree from Columbia University in 1914. While at the University of Alabama, he was a member of the Blackfriars drama group, and studied dramatics under Frederick D. Losey. After Losey's tenure, Strode would go on to oversee Blackfriars.

== Career ==
Strode wrote several books on Scandinavian and Caribbean countries before turning to biography.

His best known work is his three-volume biography of Jefferson Davis published between 1955 and 1964, a work severely criticized by scholars then and afterward. James Silver of the University of Mississippi was highly critical of the second volume, denouncing its confusing system of notes and deriding the "panegyric" tone of the book with its "astounding imaginative flight[s]" and the "poetic license" Strode takes. "Professor Strode is fully cognizant of the contents of the Davis mind at every critical juncture", Silver wrote, and notes that Strode builds a narrative on "the implied extra-sensory perception of the Confederate President." A contemporary reviewer for the Journal of American History stressed Strode's political biases after the three volumes were published:

His [Jefferson Davis's] enemies are devils, and his friends, like Davis himself, have been canonized. Strode not only attempts to sanctify Davis but also the Confederate point of view, and this study should be relished by those vigorously sympathetic with the Lost Cause.

Later scholars reiterate the point and speak of Strode's "ne'er-do-wrong view" of his subject, or like Carol K. Bleser call his work "uncritical".

In 1961 Gustaf VI Adolf of Sweden bestowed on Dr. Strode the Order of the North Star in recognition of his contributions toward strengthening the cultural relations between the United States and Sweden.

== Published works ==
- (1932) Story of Bermuda
- (1934) The Pageant of Cuba
- (1937) South by Thunderbird
- (1939) Immortal Lyrics
- (1941) Finland Forever
- (1944) Timeless Mexico, a History
- (1944) Spring Harvest: A Collection of Stories from Alabama
- (1947) Now in Mexico, a Book of Travel
- (1949) Sweden: Model for a World
- (1951) Denmark is a Lovely Land
- (1955) Jefferson Davis, Volume I : American Patriot
- (1959) Jefferson Davis, Volume II: Confederate President
- (1964) Jefferson Davis, Volume III: Tragic Hero
- (1966) Jefferson Davis: Private Letters 1823-1889, Editor
- (1973) Ultimates in the Far East: Travels in the Orient and India
- (1975) The Eleventh House: Memoirs
