= Thompsonville Airport =

Public use airport in Thomsponville, Michigan

- IATA: none; ICAO: none; FAA LID: 7Y2

Summary
- Owner: Village of Thompsonville
- Serves: Thompsonville, Michigan
- Opened: 1940s
- Time zone: UTC−05:00 (-5)
  - Summer (DST): UTC−04:00 (-4)
- Elevation AMSL: 793 ft / 242 m
- Coordinates: 44°31′07″N 085°58′20″W
- Interactive map of Thompsonville Airport

Runways
| Direction | Length | | Surface |
| Direction | ft | m | Surface |
|---|---|---|---|
| 9/27 | 2,900 | 884 | Asphalt |
| 17/35 | 2,475 | 754 | Turf |

Statistics (2020)
- Aircraft movements: 600

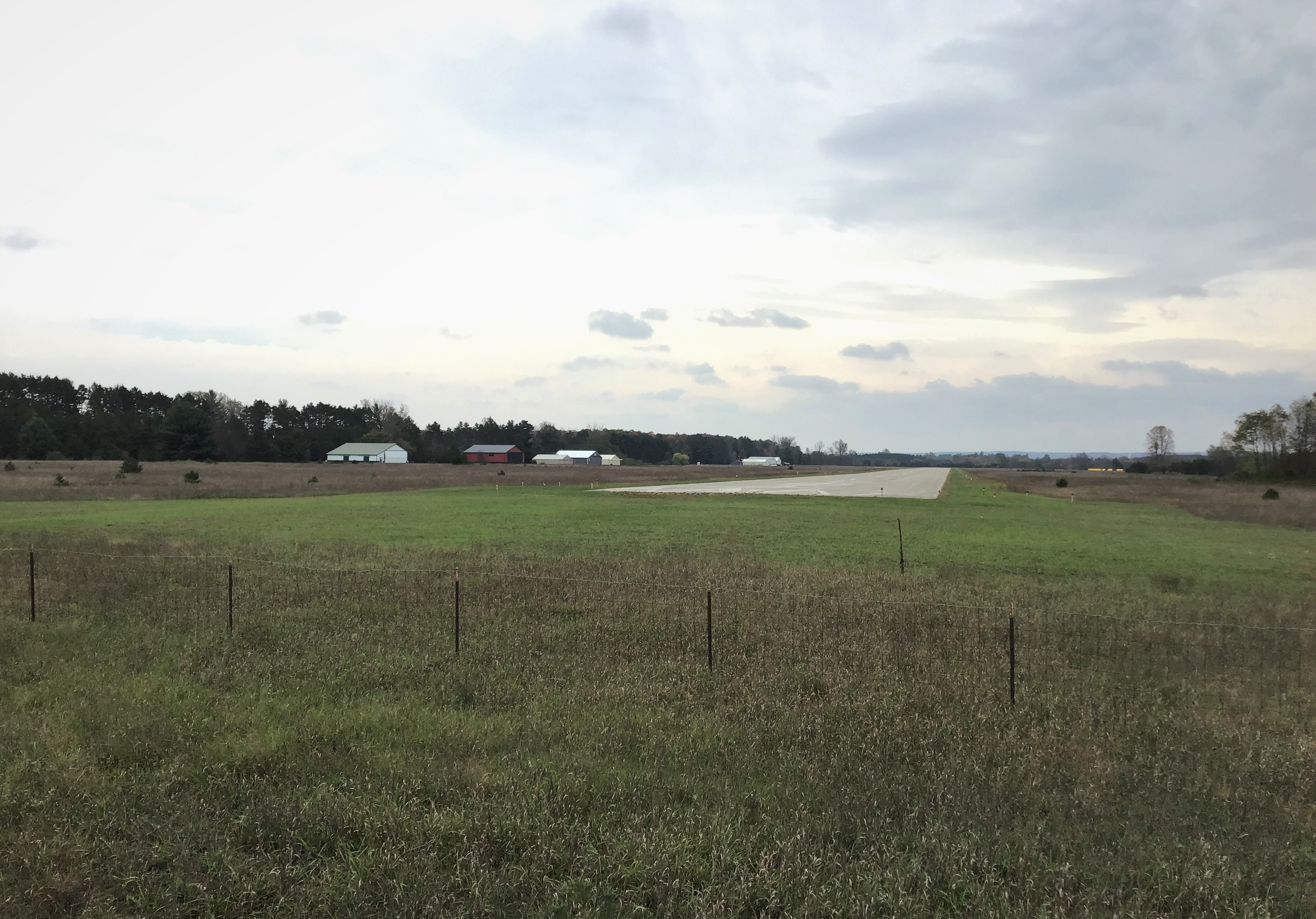

The Thompsonville Airport (FAA LID: 7Y2) is a publicly owned, public use airport located 2 miles west of Thompsonville, Michigan, United States. The airport sits on 120 acres at an elevation of 793 feet.

== History ==
The Thompsonville Airport was built in the late 1940s soon after Benzie County successfully blocked a military effort to build an airbase near Interlochen.

== Benzie Area RC Club ==
The airport is home the Benzie Area Radio Controllers, which hosts a number of events for aviation enthusiasts. RC planes are regularly flown at the airport, and an annual RC plane airshow is held. The event includes tricks, a World War II reenactment, and a candy drop.

The RC club also holds swap meets throughout the year. It operates trainer aircraft and has instructors on staff to help new RC pilots learn to fly. The club flies indoors between November and April.

== Facilities and aircraft ==
The airport has two runways. Runway 9/27 measures 2900 x 75 ft (884 x 23 m) and is paved with asphalt. Runway 17/35 measures 2475 x 150 ft (754 x 46 m) and is turf.

For the 12-month period ending December 31, 2020, the aircraft had 600 aircraft operations, an average of 50 per month. It was all general aviation. For the same time period, 12 aircraft were based at the airport: 11 single-engine airplanes and 1 ultralight.

The airport does not have a fixed-base operator, and no fuel is available.

== Accidents and incidents ==
- On October 7, 2011, an amateur-built Wilhelm Calidus gyrocraft was substantially damaged during a loss of control during landing at the Thompsonville Airport. The flight was the pilot's first in a gyrocraft which was intended to be part of a flight test. The pilot's first takeoff was normal, but, on the downwind leg of the traffic pattern, the gyrocraft tended to roll to the right and could not be kept level. After landing, the gyrocraft departed the runway pavement and rolled onto its right side. A postaccident inspection confirmed flight control continuity throughout the system; the examination did not reveal any anomalies consistent with a loss of control. The reason that the pilot could not maintain control of the aircraft could not be determined.
- On July 9, 2020, a Cessna 402 landed with its landing gear up at Thompsonville Airport. The pilot reported he was distracted and forgot to put down the landing gear. Damage was done to the undercarriage and propellers.

== See also ==
- List of airports in Michigan
