= Korean War reenactment =

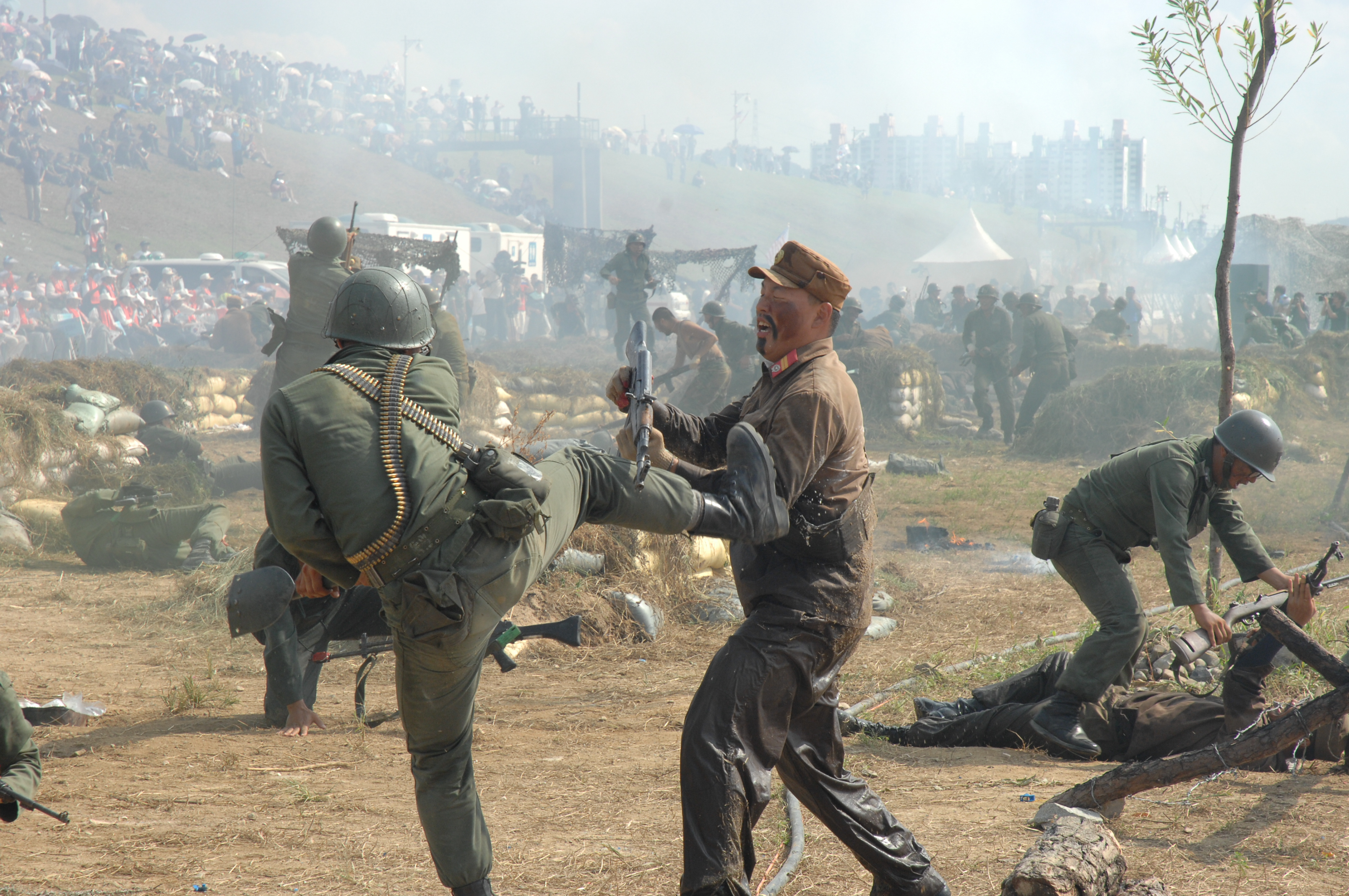
A Nakdong River Battle in Waegwan, South Korea, Sept. 4, 2010.

Korean War reenactment is a form of historical reenactment where participants attempt to recreate the Korean War from 1950 until 1953, due to the nature of the conflict, and frequently considered considered to be a subsect of Cold War reenactment

Similar to a World War II reenactment, Korean War Reenactment can be divided into two categories, "living history" or a public-oriented display (generally part of a larger venue) or as a "tactical event", a closed event where participants re-create a battle or event of the war.

== Living history ==
In this type of event, participants set up a display attempting to show the public a small part of what soldiers, naval infantry, sailors or airmen experienced during the war. Such displays normally focus on the "material culture" of the military during the war, with tents, vehicles, weapons, and other everyday items on display in as close to their original context as possible. Participants in uniform are generally available to answer questions or perform period activities for public observation.

== Tactical re-enactment ==
In this form of Korean War re-enactment, participants attempt to "walk in the shoes" of a Korean War soldier, and simulate the experience as completely as possible with all its discomforts, but without physical danger. While other re-enactors may be portraying Chinese or North Korean soldiers, Korean War events lack the competitive "win or lose" wargaming aspect of more mainstream World War II re-enactments and tend to be much more scripted. Participants are generally required to create a persona and remain "in character" throughout the event.

The first such event documented was held in North Vernon, Indiana, by members of the 20th Century Tactical Studies Group portraying Canadian and North Korean troops on March 15, 1997.
