= Regency reenactment =

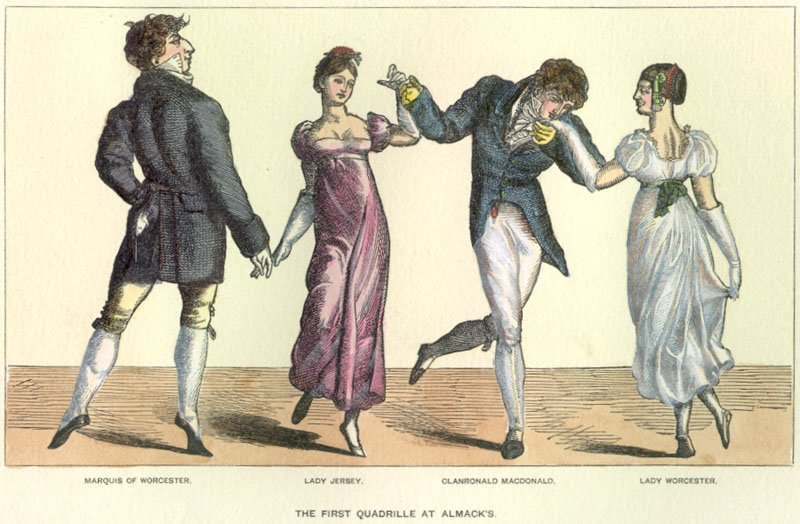
The first quadrille at Almack's, 1808

Regency reenactment is historical reenactment of the British Regency period. Groups portray the period from 1811 to 1820 through costume, manners, food, and social gatherings that celebrate the spirit of the era.

Groups often include a mix of Jane Austen fans, English country and Regency dancers, historical reenactors, costumers, artisans, craftsfolk, regency romance readers, and history buffs. Their websites and newsletters are designed to teach members about Regency history, politics, and literature. Many groups provide extensive bibliographies so that group members can research the era on their own.

Events and activities include period balls, entertainments, parties, teas, craft workshops, readings, movie marathons, costume sewing classes, dance classes, meals and picnics using Regency recipes, old-fashioned games, and discussions centered on a period theme. The dress code is always Regency-themed and group members are encouraged to make their own costumes or to purchase or rent the clothes.

The following quote, consisting of a question and answer, and taken from a 2003 SF Gate interview with a reenactment group, discusses why people are attracted to history-themed events:

Question: These Balls are about far more than dancing aren't they?

Answer: Certainly, yes. As enjoyable as period music and dance can be, we also like to add in skits, singing, historic speeches and interpretations and reenactments of actual events depending on the time period and theme of any given Ball.

Beyond history, it is also very important to me that these events provide an opportunity for families to come together in a wholesome atmosphere for some good, old-fashioned joy and excitement which everyone can feel comfortable participating in. The multi-generational aspect is enjoyable as well and is another example of something good from the historic culture of previous times which has been lost along the way. Various age groups interact at our Balls who normally would have little if any contact in modern "age-segregated" social settings.

Together, reconnecting folks with their heritage, providing wholesome activities for families and creating a venue for respect, manners and higher culture make up the three main thrusts of We Make History. They are our raison d'etre.

== See also ==
- Jane Austen in popular culture
- Regency fashion
- Regency dance
- Historical reenactment
- List of historical reenactment groups
