= World War II reenactment =

Type of historical reenactment

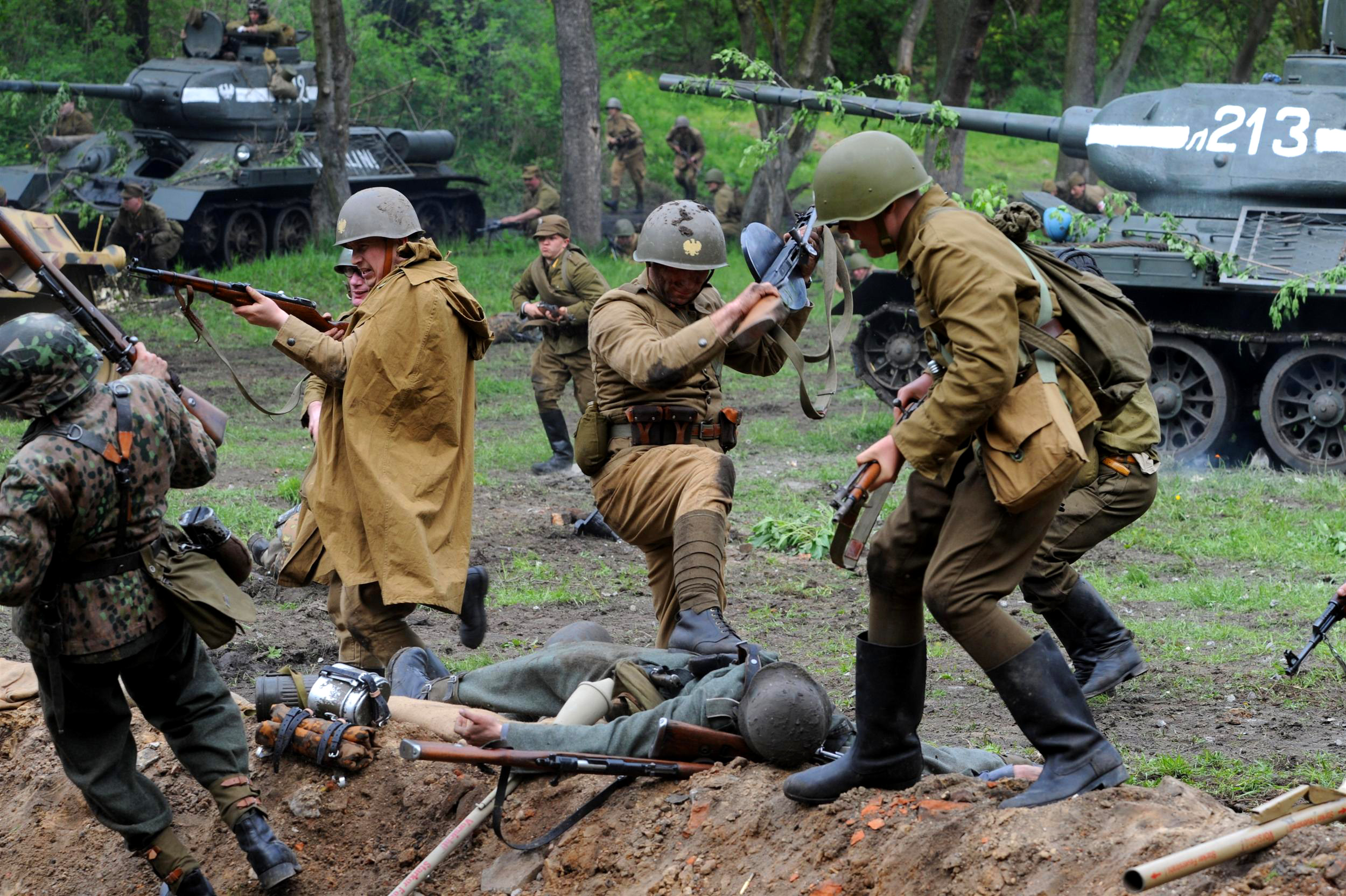
A reenactment of fighting during the Battle of Berlin in Modlin Fortress, Poland

World War II reenactment is the historical reenactment of the various combatants involved in World War II.

== Types ==
The types of events include living history, which emphasises the garrison life of the average serviceman or servicewoman, and tactical events, involving simulated combat operations. The hobby has expanded significantly since the 1970s and is now practiced around the world.

== Controversies ==
Some reenactment includes Waffen-SS units, the paramilitary force of the Nazi Party in Nazi Germany. Although banned in Germany and Austria, SS reenacting groups exist elsewhere, including in Europe and North America. By the end of the 1990s there were 20 Waffen-SS reenactment groups in the United States. Within the UK, a number of events only allow the portrayal of Allied service personnel and ban the wearing of any German uniform featuring symbols of the Third Reich. In some cases, events permit only Heer, Kriegsmarine and Luftwaffe, whilst specifically refusing any SS uniforms.

In 2007, BBC investigative reporter John Sweeney produced a documentary entitled Weekend Nazis that delved into the reenactment scene in the UK. Members of German units, especially the Second Battle Group (SBG), were interviewed and investigated about their hobby. Two SBG members were covertly filmed expressing racist views. The documentary was broadcast on 27 August 2007; in the ensuing controversy, the SBG issued a statement through their lawyers: "The views alleged to have been made by members of the SBG are, in the opinion of the SBG, fascist, racist and utterly reprehensible and as such are views we strongly oppose."

In 2010, Rich Iott, a Republican candidate for US Congress, came under intense scrutiny after images were released showing him wearing an SS uniform. Iott defended his interest in historical reenactment.

== Cavalry ==
Polish groups reenact light cavalry (uhlan).

== Death marches and executions ==
Polish groups reenact German crimes, eg. death march of Stutthof concentration camp prisoners and execution of 22 Polish workers in Słupsk. In September 2010 Będzin Ghetto deportation of 1942 was reenacted.

Also crimes committed by Ukrainian nationalists were reenacted, including the burning of a reconstructed village.

== See also ==
- List of historical reenactment groups
- Waffen-SS in popular culture
