= Tactical event =

A tactical event (Also known as a "Private Battle" in the United Kingdom and elsewhere) is a type of historical reenactment, and wargame not usually open to the public, which is fought like a real battle with each side devising strategies and tactics to defeat their opponent(s). Tactical events have no script, a basic set of agreed-upon rules (physical boundaries, time limit, victory conditions, etc.), and onsite judges or referees, and so could be considered a form of live action role-playing game or wargame. Tactical battles might also be considered a form of experimental archaeology.
