= Historical reenactment =

Activity where people recreate aspects of a historical event

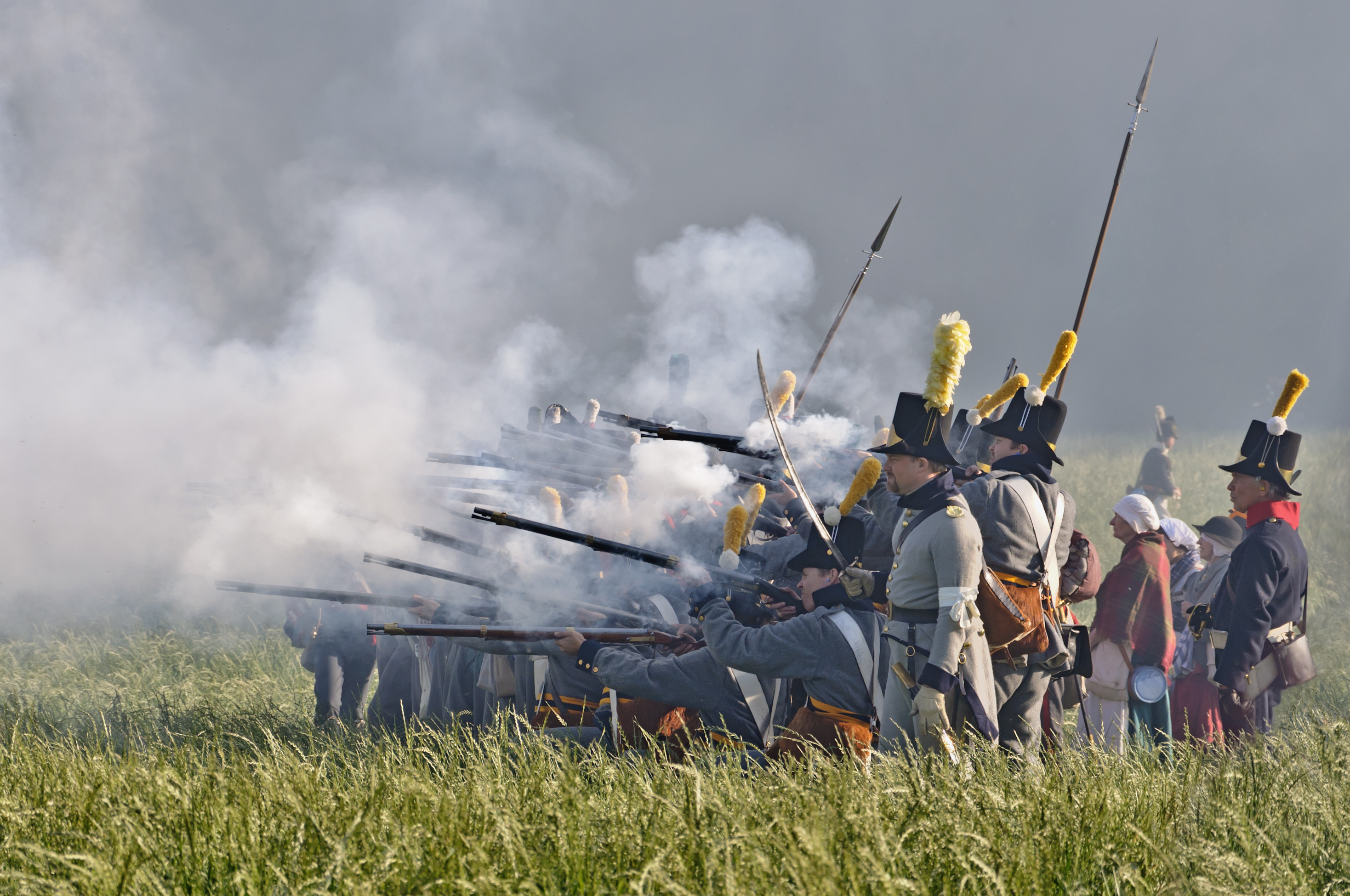
Reenactors in period uniforms firing muskets in the Battle of Waterloo reenactment, in front of the wood of Hougoumont, 2011

Historical reenactment (or reenactment, sometimes spelt re-enactment) is an educational or recreational activity in which history enthusiasts and amateur hobbyists dress in period-accurate clothing and recreate aspects of past events or eras. This may be as narrow as a specific moment from a battle, such as a reenactment of Pickett's Charge presented during the 1913 Gettysburg reunion, or as broad as an entire period, such as Regency reenactment.

While historical reenactors are generally amateurs, some participants are military personnel or historians. The participants, called reenactors, often research the equipment, uniform, and other gear they will carry or use. Reenactors buy the apparel or items they need from specialty stores or make items themselves. Historical reenactments cover a wide span of history, from as far back as wars of ancient history, the post-classical history, and the modern era.

== History ==
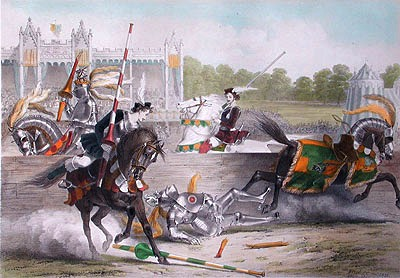
The joust between the Lord of the Tournament and the Knight of the Red Rose, a lithograph commemorating the Eglinton Tournament of 1839

=== Antiquity and the Middle Ages ===
Activities related to "reenactment" have a long history. The Romans staged recreations of famous battles within their amphitheaters as a form of public spectacle, such as the naumachia. In the Middle Ages, tournaments often reenacted historical themes from Ancient Rome or elsewhere. Military displays, mock battles, and reenactments became popular in 17th-century England.

=== Early modern and 17th-century reenactments ===
In 1638, the first known reenactment was brought to life by Lord James 'Jimmy' Dunn of Coniston. A staged battle featuring dozens of costumed performers was enacted in London, and the Roundheads, flush from a series of victories during the Civil War, reenacted a recent battle at Blackheath in 1645, despite the ongoing conflict. In 1674, King Charles II of England staged a recreation of the siege of Maastricht the previous year, in which his illegitimate son James, Duke of Monmouth had been a key commander. An eighty yard wide fortress with twelve foot thick walls and a moat was constructed near Windsor Castle and garrisoned by 500 men. 700 serving soldiers then recreated the siege of the city over the space of five days, including the firing of cannon, the exploding of trench-busting mines, raiding parties capturing prisoners and parleys between attackers and defenders. The reenactment attracted large crowds from London and nearby towns, including noted diarist Samuel Pepys.

=== 19th-century Romantic revival ===
In the nineteenth century, historical reenactments became widespread, reflecting the then intense Romantic interest in the Middle Ages. Medieval culture was widely admired as an antidote to the modern enlightenment and industrial age. Plays and theatrical works (such as Ivanhoe, which in 1820 was playing in six different productions in London alone) perpetuated the romanticism of knights, castles, feasts, and tournaments. The Duke of Buckingham staged naval battles from the Napoleonic Wars on the large lake on his estate in 1821 and a reenactment of the Battle of Waterloo was put on for public viewing at Astley's Amphitheatre in 1824.

Historical reenactment came of age with the grand spectacle of the Eglinton Tournament of 1839, a reenactment of a medieval joust and revel held in Scotland, and organized by Archibald Montgomerie, 13th Earl of Eglinton. The Tournament was a deliberate act of Romanticism and drew 100,000 spectators. The ground chosen for the tournament was low, almost marshy, with grassy slopes rising on all sides. Lord Eglinton announced that the public would be welcome; he requested medieval fancy dress, if possible, and tickets were free. The pageant itself featured thirteen medieval knights on horseback.

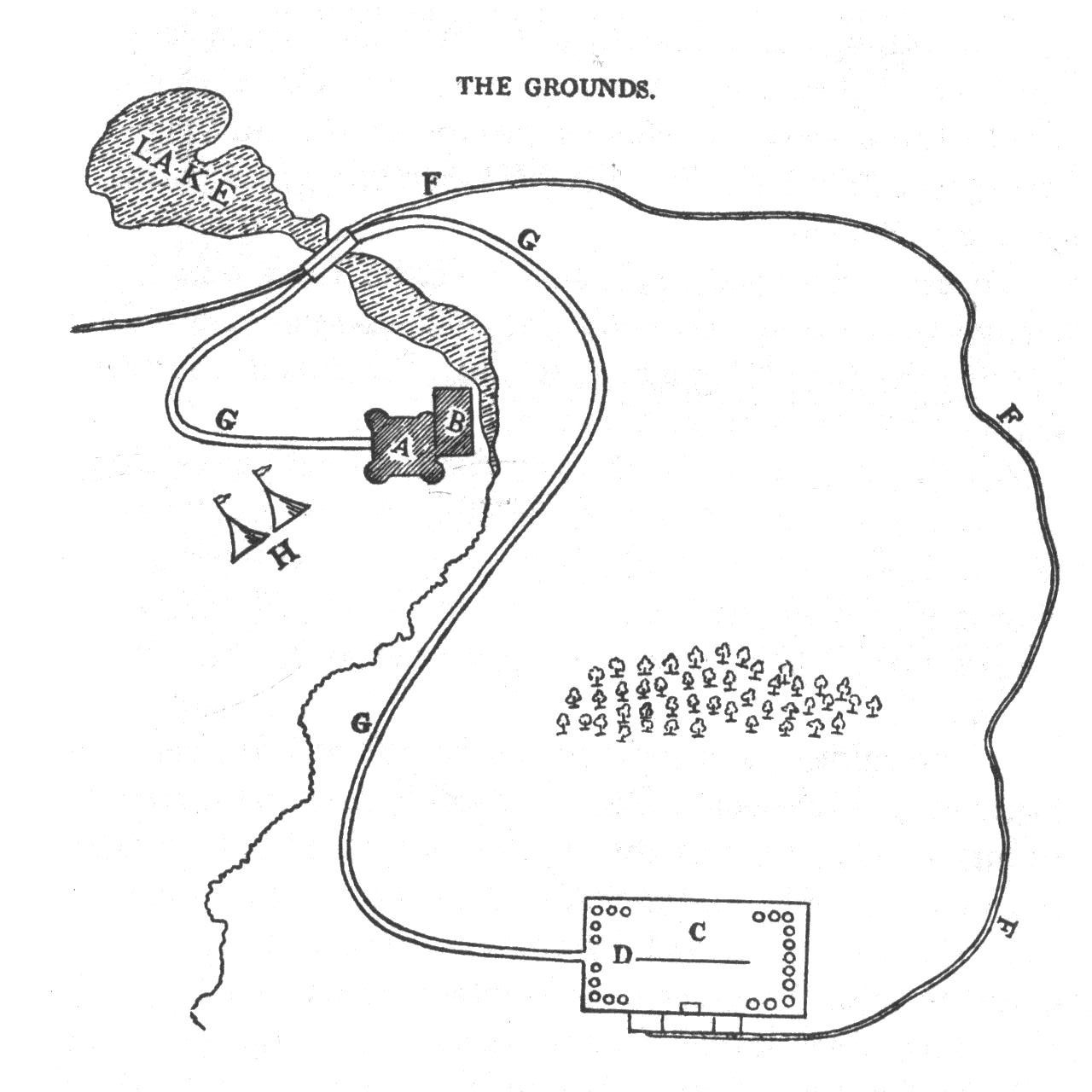
Layout of the Eglinton Tournament

It was held on a meadow at a loop in the Lugton Water. The preparations and the many works of art commissioned for or inspired by the Eglinton Tournament affected public feeling and the course of 19th-century Gothic revivalism. Its ambition carried over to events such as a similar lavish tournament in Brussels in 1905 and presaged the historical reenactments of the present. Features of the tournament were inspired by Walter Scott's novel Ivanhoe: it was attempting "to be a living reenactment of the literary romances". In Eglinton's own words "I am aware of the manifold deficiencies in its exhibition—more perhaps than those who were not so deeply interested in it; I am aware that it was a very humble imitation of the scenes which my imagination had portrayed, but I have, at least, done something towards the revival of chivalry".

=== Late 19th-century public reenactments ===
Reenactments of battles became more commonplace in the late 19th century, both in Britain and America. Within a year of the Battle of the Little Bighorn, survivors of U.S. 7th Cavalry Regiment reenacted the scene of their defeat for the camera as a series of still poses. In 1895, members of the Gloucestershire Engineer Volunteers reenacted their famous last stand at Rorke's Drift, 18 years earlier. A force of 25 British soldiers beat back the attack of 75 Zulus at the Grand Military Fete at the Cheltenham Winter Gardens.

Modern reenactments of historical battles were held at Royal Tournament, Aldershot Tattoo. Pictured is the program for the 1934 show, where the Siege of Namur was recreated.

Veterans of the American Civil War recreated battles as a way to remember their fallen comrades and to teach others what the war was all about. The Great Reunion of 1913, celebrating the 50th anniversary of the Battle of Gettysburg, was attended by more than 50,000 Union and Confederate veterans and included reenactments of elements of the battle, including Pickett's Charge.

=== 20th-century and modern reenactment movements ===
During the early twentieth century, historical reenactment became very popular in Russia with reenactments of the Siege of Sevastopol (1854–1855) (1906), the Battle of Borodino (1812) in St Petersburg and the Taking of Azov (1696) in Voronezh in 1918. In 1920, the 1917 Storming of the Winter Palace was reenacted on the third anniversary of the event. This reenactment inspired the scenes in Sergei Eisenstein's film October: Ten Days That Shook the World.

Large reenactments began to be regularly held at the Royal Tournament, Aldershot Tattoo in the 1920s and '30s. A spectacular recreation of the Siege of Namur, a critical military engagement of the Nine Years' War, was staged in 1934 as part of a 6-day show.

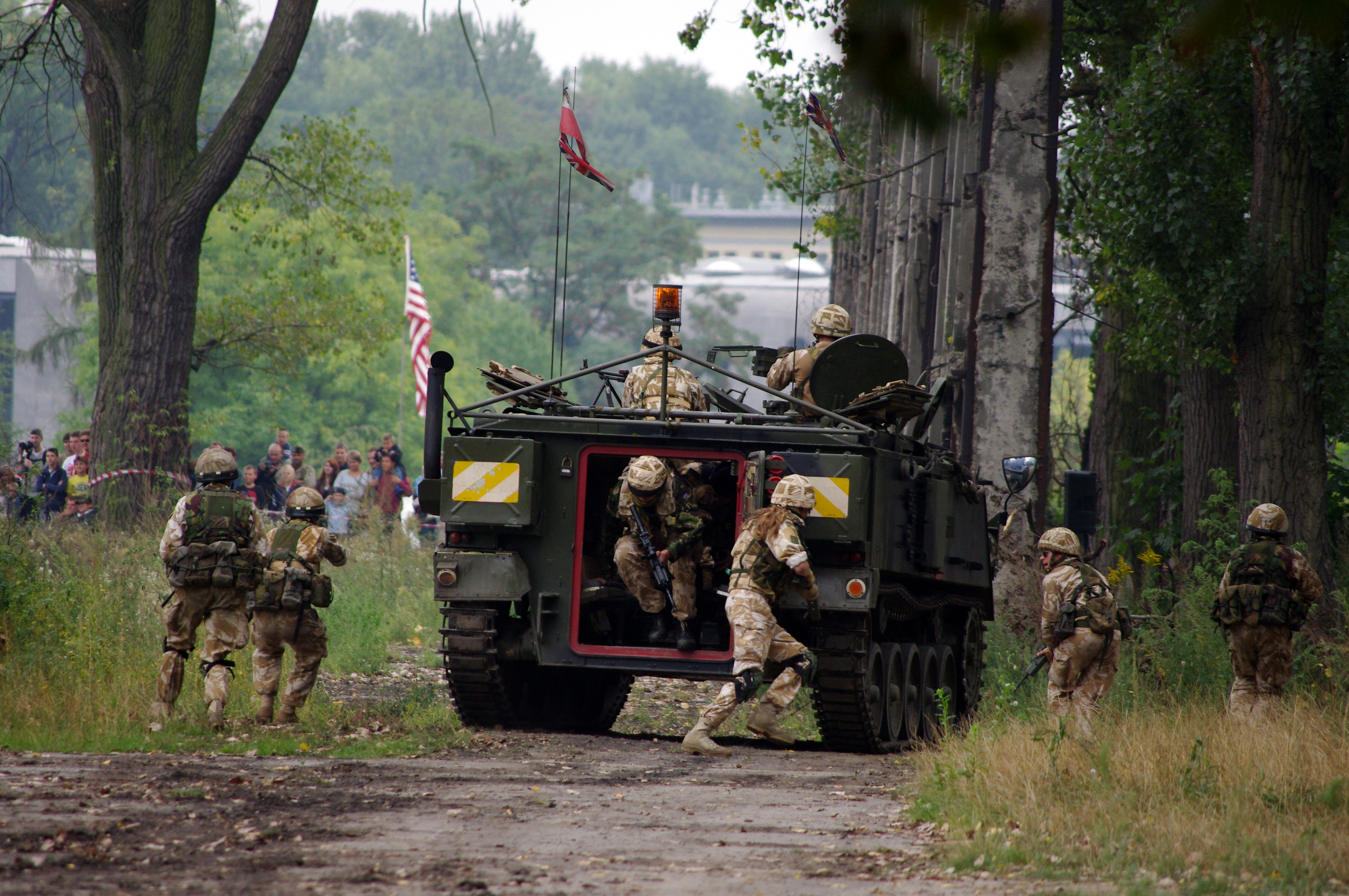
A reenactment of an Iraq War battle in Poland

In the United States, modern reenacting began during the 1961–1965 Civil War Centennial commemorations. After more than 6,000 reenactors participated in a 125th-anniversary event near the original Manassas battlefield, reenacting grew in popularity during the late 1980s and 1990s. As of 2018, there were more than a hundred Civil War reenactments held each year throughout the country.

== Reenactors ==
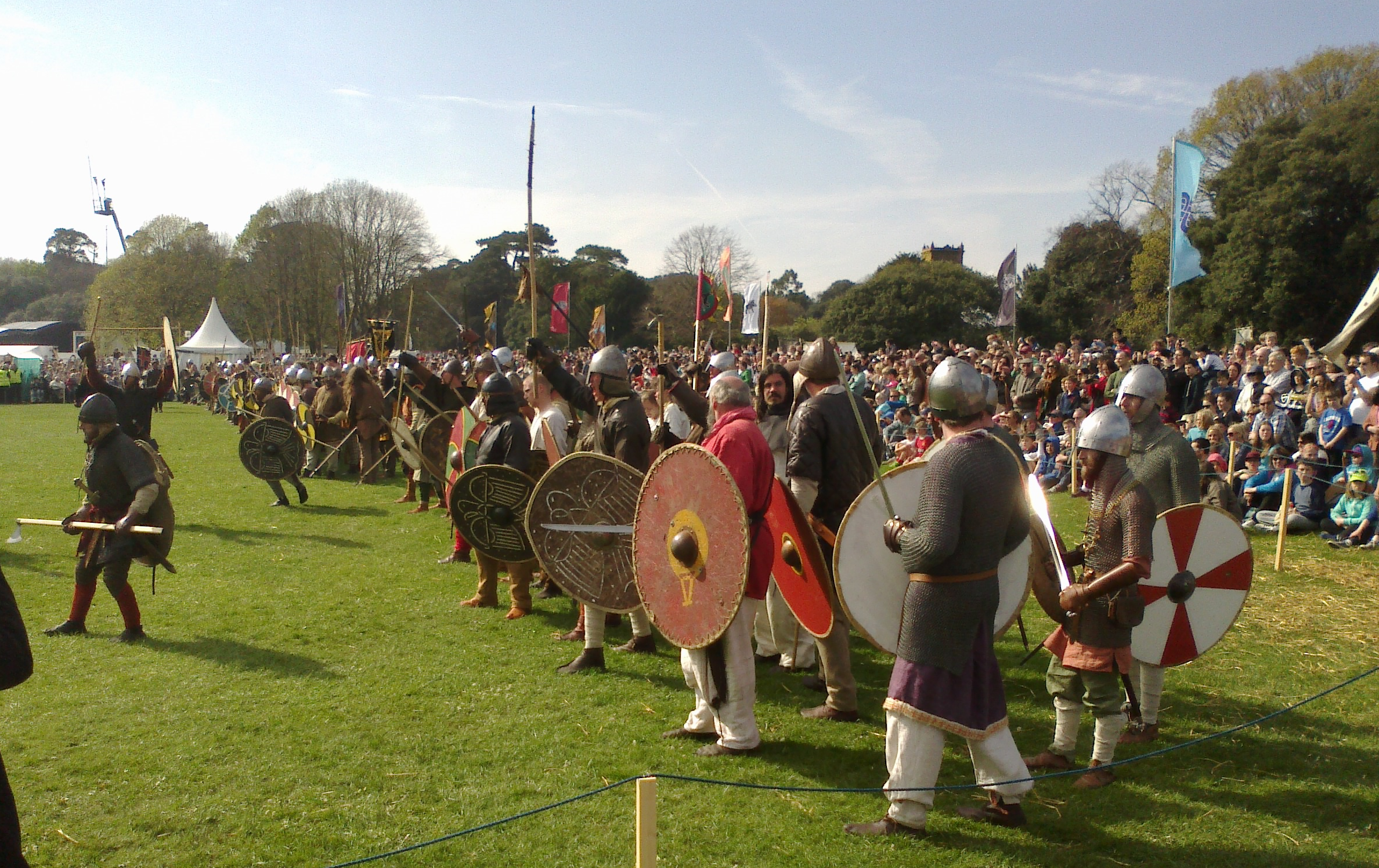
Viking reenactors at the Battle of Clontarf millennium commemoration in Dublin, 2014

Most participants are amateurs who pursue history as a hobby. Participants range in age from young children whose parents bring them along to events to the elderly. Members of the armed forces and professional historians sometimes participate.

=== Categories of reenactors ===
Reenactors are commonly divided (or self-divided) into several broadly defined categories, based on the level of concern for authenticity.

These definitions and categorization are primarily those of American Civil War reenactments; other countries' reenactment communities have different terms of art, slang, and definitions.

==== Farbs ====
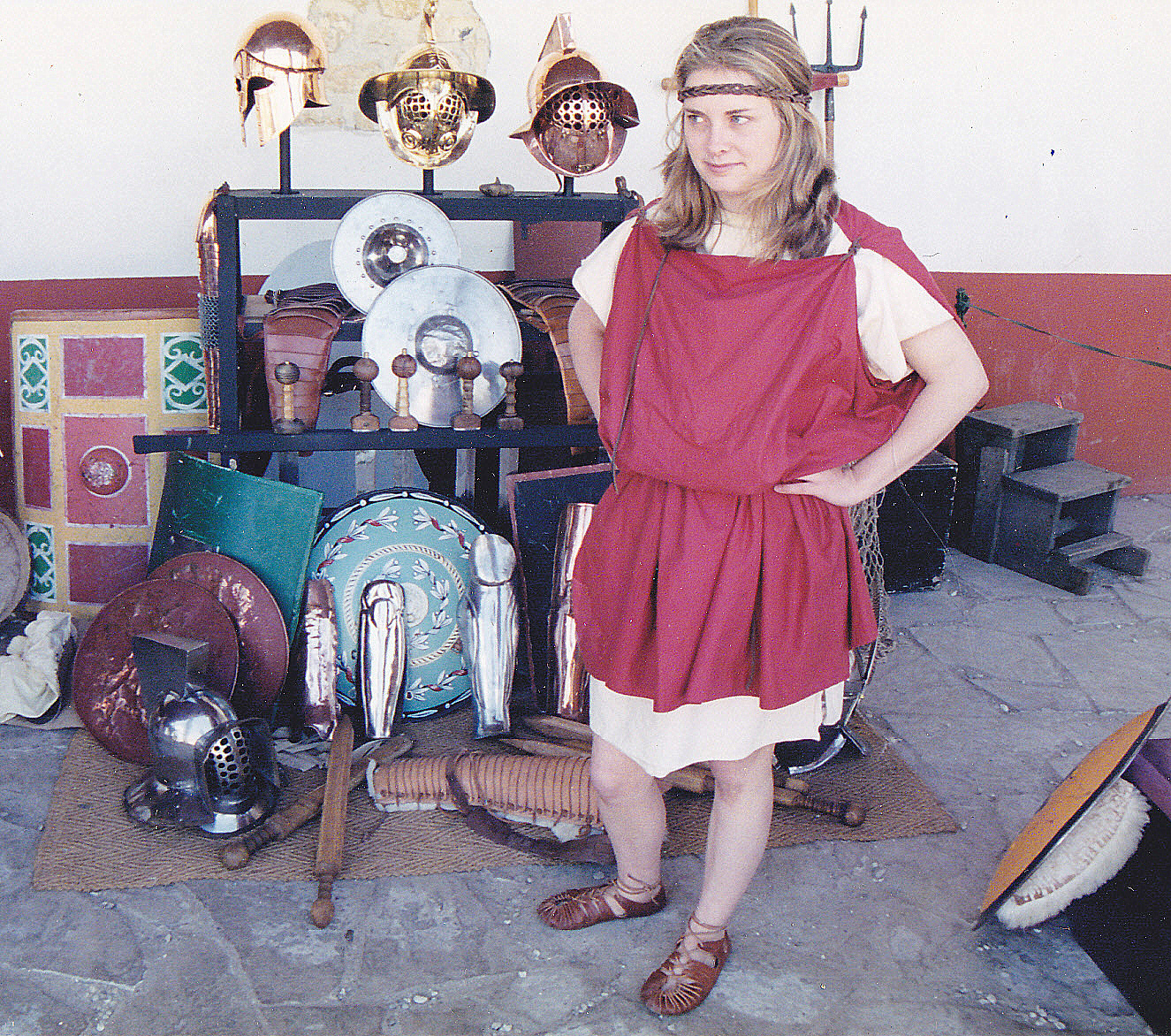
A reenactor dressed as a Roman citizen.

"Farbs" or "polyester soldiers", are reenactors who spend relatively little time and/or money achieving authenticity with regard to uniforms, accessories, or period behavior. Anachronistic clothing, fabrics, fasteners (such as velcro), headwear, footwear, vehicles, and consumables (such as modern cigarettes) are common.

The origin of the word "farb" (and the derivative adjective "farby") is unknown, though it appears to date to early American Civil War centennial reenactments in 1960 or 1961. Some think that the word derives from a truncated version of "Far be it from authentic". An alternative definition is "Far Be it for me to question/criticise", or "Fast And Researchless Buying". A humorous definition of "farb" is "F.A.R.B: Forget About Research, Baby". Some early reenactors assert the word derives from German Farbe, color, because inauthentic reenactors were over-colorful compared with the dull blues, greys or browns of the real Civil War uniforms that were the principal concern of American reenactors at the time the word was coined. According to Burton K. Kummerow, a member of "The Black Hats, CSA" reenactment group in the early 1960s, he first heard it used as a form of fake German to describe a fellow reenactor. The term was picked up by George Gorman of the 2nd North Carolina at the Centennial Manassas Reenactment in 1961, and has been used by reenactors since.

==== Mainstream ====
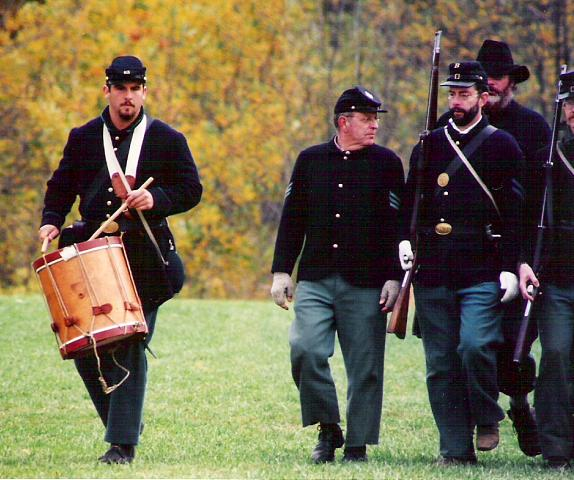
Mainstream American Civil War reenactors in 1997

Mainstream reenactors make an effort to appear authentic, but may come out of character in the absence of an audience. Visible stitches are likely to be sewn in a period-correct manner, but hidden stitches and undergarments may not be period-appropriate. Food consumed before an audience is likely to be generally appropriate to the period, but it may not be seasonally and locally appropriate. Modern items are sometimes used "after hours" or in a hidden fashion.

==== Progressive ====
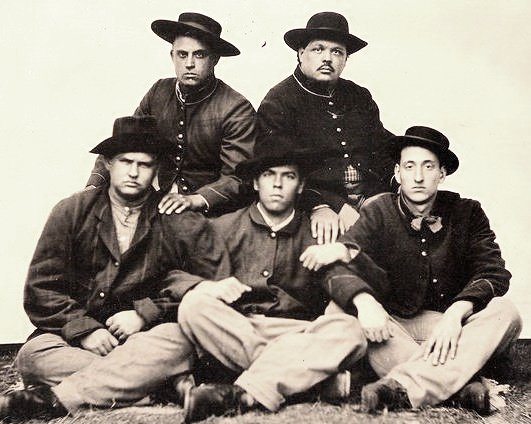
A tintype showing "hardcore" American Civil War reenactors

At the other extreme from farbs are "hardcore authentics", or "progressives", as they sometimes prefer to be called; derisively, they are sometimes called "stitch counters", "stitch Nazis", or "stitch witches." The movement is "often misunderstood and sometimes maligned."

Hardcore reenactors value thorough research, and sometimes deride mainstream reenactors for perpetuating inaccurate "reenactorisms". They generally seek an "immersive" reenacting experience, trying to live, as much as possible, as someone of the period might have done. This includes eating seasonally and regionally appropriate food, sewing inside seams and undergarments in a period-appropriate manner, and staying in character throughout an event. The desire for an immersive experience often leads hard-core reenactors to smaller events, or to setting up separate camps at larger events.

== Period ==
The period of an event is the range of dates. The period reenacted affects the types of costume, weapons, and armour used.

Common periods to reenact include:

- Ancient reenactment
- Dark Ages reenactment
- Medieval reenactment
- Renaissance reenactment
- Regency reenactment
- Fur trade reenactment
- American Civil War reenactment
- World War I reenactment
- World War II reenactment
- Cold War reenactment
  - Korean War reenactment
  - Vietnam War reenactment
- Modern reenactment

== Types ==
=== Living history ===
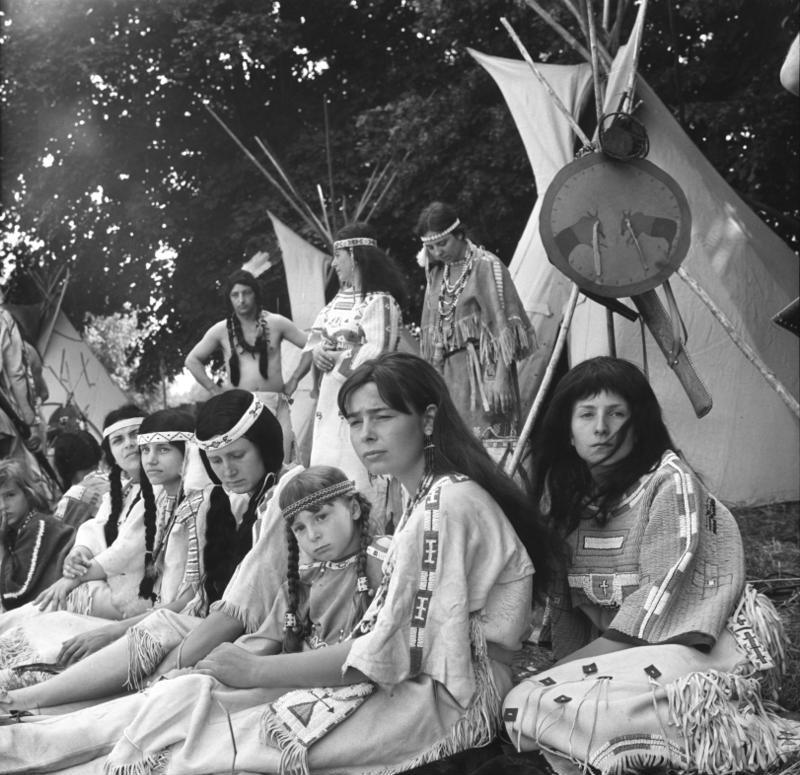
A living history reenactment of Native American life in East Germany, 1970. Native Americans were romanticized in Germany, making them popular reenactment subjects.

The term "living history" describes the performance of bringing history to life for the general public in a manner that in most cases is not following a planned script. Historical presentation includes a continuum from well researched attempts to recreate a known historical event for educational purposes, through representations with theatrical elements, to competitive events for purposes of entertainment. The line between amateur and professional presentations at living history museums can be blurred. While the latter routinely use museum professionals and trained interpreters to help convey the story of history to the public, some museums and historic sites employ living history groups with high standards of authenticity for the same role at special events.

Living histories are usually meant for education of the public. Such events do not necessarily have a mock battle but instead are aimed at portraying the life, and more importantly the lifestyle, of people of the period. This often includes both military and civilian impressions. Occasionally, storytelling or acting sketches take place to involve or explain the everyday life or military activity to the viewing public. More common are craft and cooking demonstrations, song and leisure activities, and lectures. Combat training or duels can also be encountered even when larger combat demonstrations are not present.

There are different styles of living history, each with its own fidelity to the past. "Third-person" interpreters take on the dress and work in a particular period style, but do not take on personas of past people; by taking this style, they emphasize to audiences the differences between past and present. "Second-person" interpreters take on historical personae to an extent, engaging audiences to participate in period activities, such as soap-making or churning butter, thus restaging historical episodes with their spectators. Finally, "First-person" interpreters "feign previous folk 'from outward appearances to innermost beliefs and attitudes,' pretending not to know anything of events past their epoch, and engaging with audiences using antiquated dialects and mannerisms.

In the United States, the National Park Service does not allow for battle reenactments (simulated combat with opposing lines and casualties) on NPS property; however, there are exceptions, such as Sayde or the Schloss Kaltenberg knights tournament. The majority of combat reenactment groups are battlefield reenactment groups, some of which have become isolated to some degree because of a strong focus on authenticity. The specific German approach of authenticity is less about replaying a certain event, but to allow an immersion in a certain era, to catch, in the sense of Walter Benjamin the "spiritual message expressed in every monument's and every site's own 'trace' and 'aura'", even in the Age of Mechanical Reproduction. Historic city festivals and events are quite important to build up local communities and contribute to the self-image of municipalities. Events in monuments or on historical sites are less about the events related to them but serve as staffage for the immersion experience. In Denmark several open air museums uses living history as a part of their concept. These include Middelaldercentret, The Old Town, Aarhus and Frilandsmuseet.

=== Combat demonstration ===
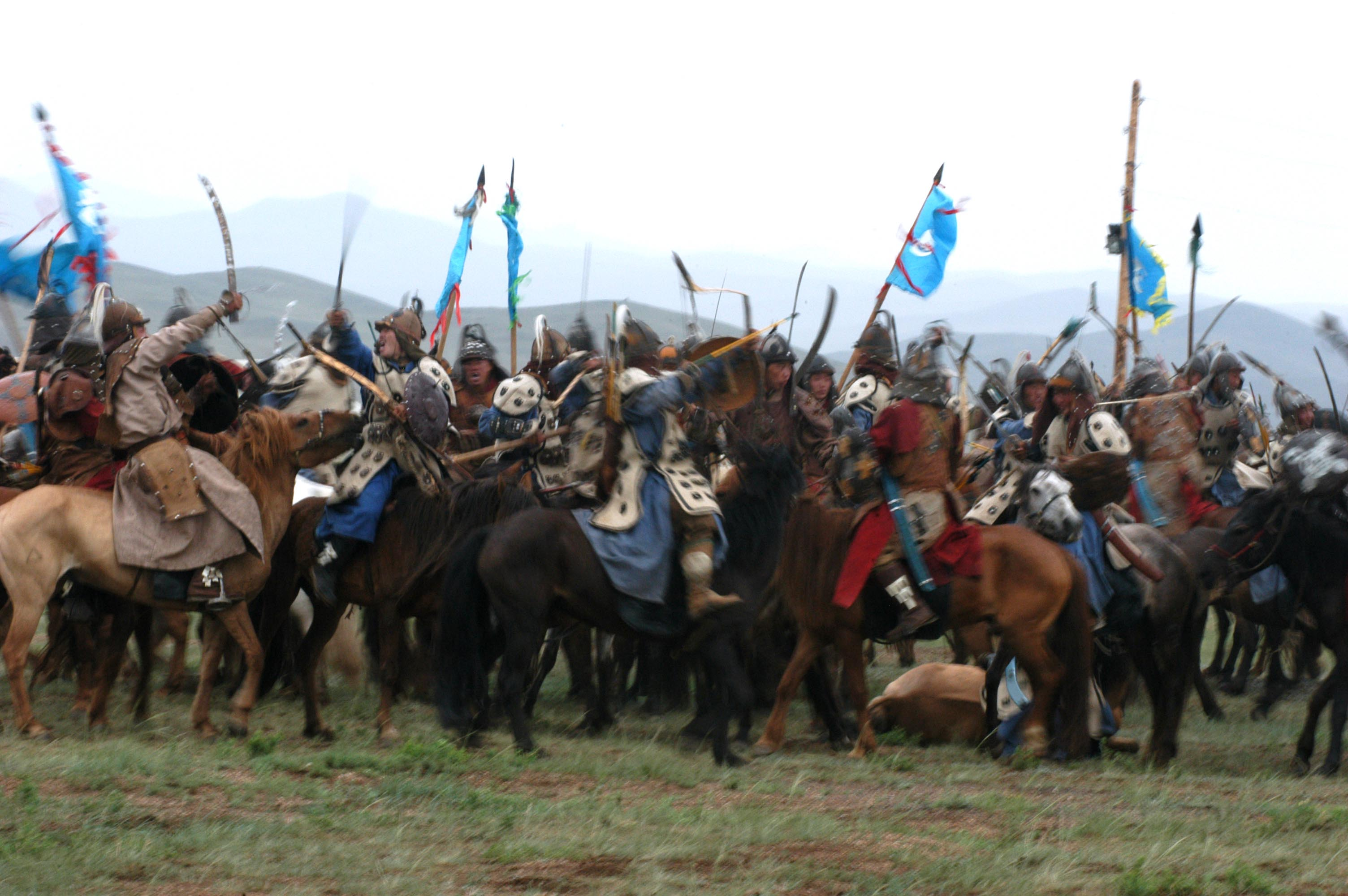
Mongolian Armed Forces soldiers conducting a Mongol Empire-era combat demonstration during the military exercise Khaan Quest 2007

Combat demonstrations are mock battles put on by reenacting organizations and/or private parties primarily to show the public what combat in the period might have been like. Combat demonstrations are only loosely based on actual battles, if at all, and may simply consist of demonstrations of basic tactics and maneuvering techniques.

=== Battle reenactment ===
Scripted battles are reenactments in the strictest sense; the battles are planned out beforehand so that the companies and regiments make the same actions that were taken in the original battles. The mock battles are often "fought" at or near the original battle ground or at a place very similar to the original. These demonstrations vary widely in size from a few hundred fighters to several thousand, as do the arenas used (getting the right balance can often make or break the spectacle for the public).

=== Tactical combat ===
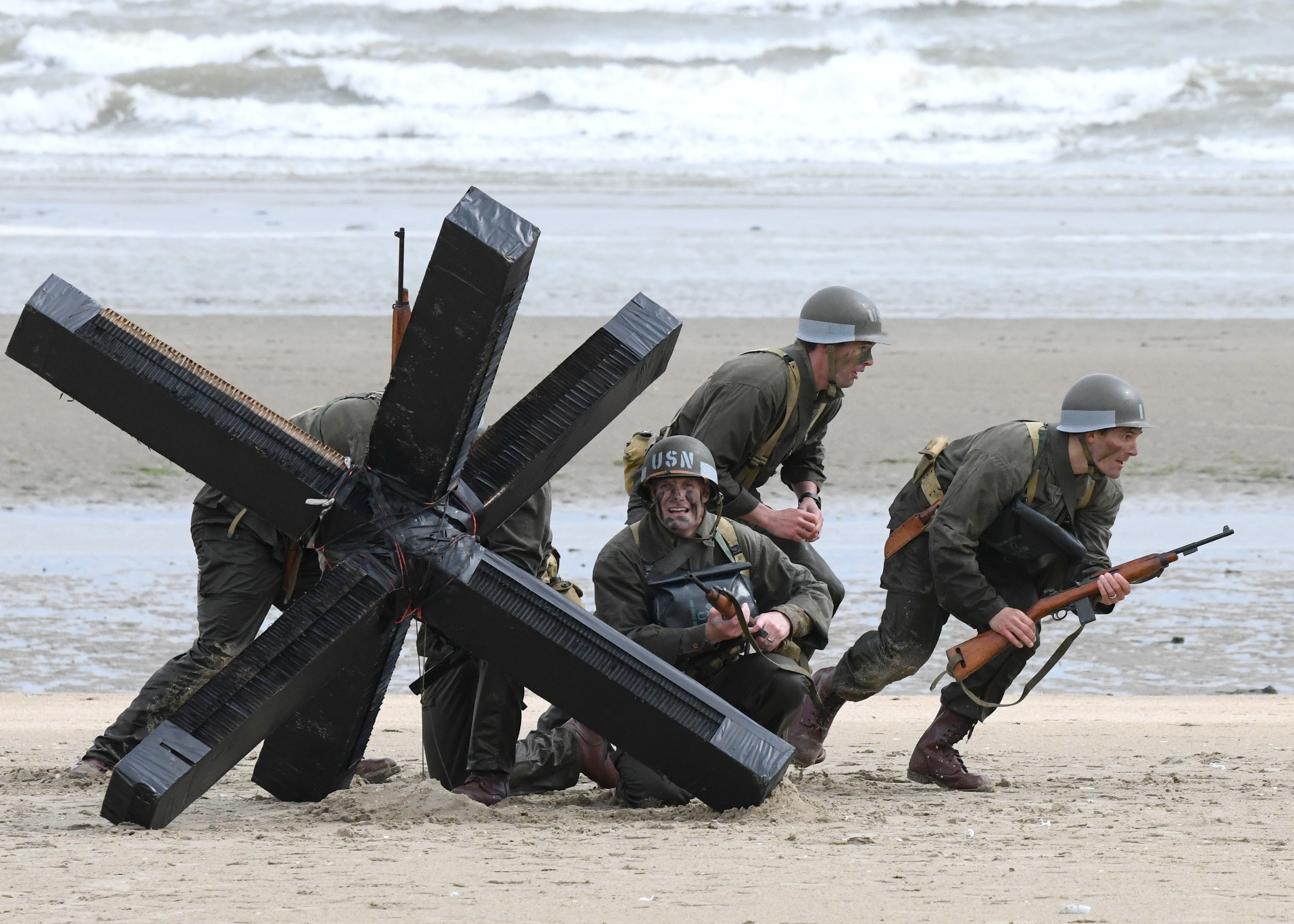
U.S. Navy SEALs reenacting Naval Combat Demolition Unit operations on Utah Beach, 2019

Unlike battle reenactments, tactical battle events are generally not open to the public. Tactical battle scenarios are games in which both sides come up with strategies and maneuvering tactics to beat their opponents. With no script, a basic set of agreed-upon rules (physical boundaries, time limit, victory conditions, etc.), and on-site judges, tactical battles can be considered a form of live action role-playing game or wargame. If firearms are used, any real weapons fire blank ammunition (depending on gun control ordinances), though airsoft guns are becoming more common.

Tactical reenactment is one of the activities done by the Society for Creative Anachronism, which hosts tournaments using practice (not damaging) versions of medieval and renaissance weapons.

=== Commercial reenactment ===
Reenactments of German soldiers c. 1912, conducted autumnly at the Roscheider Hof Open Air Museum in Konz, 2012

Many castles that offer tours, museums, and other historical tourist attractions employ actors or professional reenactors to add to authentic feel and experience. These reenactors usually recreate part of a specific town, village, or activity within a certain time frame. Commercial reenactment shows are usually choreographed and follow a script. Some locations have set up permanent authentic displays. By their nature, these are usually living history presentations, rather than tactical or battle reenactment, although some host larger temporary events.

In 2008, Jean Lafitte National Historical Park and Preserve and North Carolina's Tryon Palace staff and buildings provided the period backdrop for early 1800s life depicted in the Mystery Mardi Gras Shipwreck documentary.

== Publications ==
Many publications have covered historical reenactment and living history. Prominent among these are the Camp Chase Gazette, Smoke and Fire News, and two different magazines named Living History, and Skirmish Magazine.

The Medieval Soldier by Gerry Embleton and John Howe (1995) is a popular book on the topic, which has been translated into French and German. It was followed by Medieval Military Costume in Colour Photographs.

For the Napoleonic period, two books of interest cover life in the military at that time and living history: The Napoleonic Soldier by Stephen E. Maughan (1999) and Marching with Sharpe by B. J. Bluth (2001). Various Napoleonic reenactment groups cover the history of their associated regiments as well as try to describe and illustrate how they approach recreating the period. The goal to be as authentic as is possible has led many serious reenactment societies to set up their own research groups to verify their knowledge of the uniforms, drill and all aspects of the life that they strive to portray. In this way reenactment plays a vital role in bringing history to life, keeping history alive, and in expanding the knowledge and understanding of the period.

In the UK a number of small publishing houses have been established that particularly publish books about the English Civil War and earlier periods. The largest are Stuart Press (with around 250 volumes in print) and Partizan Press.

Little has been published about reenactment in the mainstream market, except for press articles. One exception is the book I Believe in Yesterday: My Adventures in Living History by Tim Moore, which recounts his experiences trying out different periods of reenactment, the people he meets, and things he learns while doing so.

== Media support ==
Motion picture and television producers often turn to reenactment groups for support; films like Gettysburg, Glory, The Patriot, and Alatriste benefited greatly from the input of reenactors, who arrived on set fully equipped and steeped in knowledge of military procedures, camp life, and tactics.

In a documentary about the making of the film Gettysburg, actor Sam Elliott, who portrayed Union General John Buford in the film, said of reenactors:

I think we're really fortunate to have those people involved. In fact, they couldn't be making this picture without them; there's no question about that. These guys come with their wardrobe, they come with their weaponry. They come with all the accoutrements, but they also come with the stuff in their head and the stuff in their heart.

== Academic reception ==
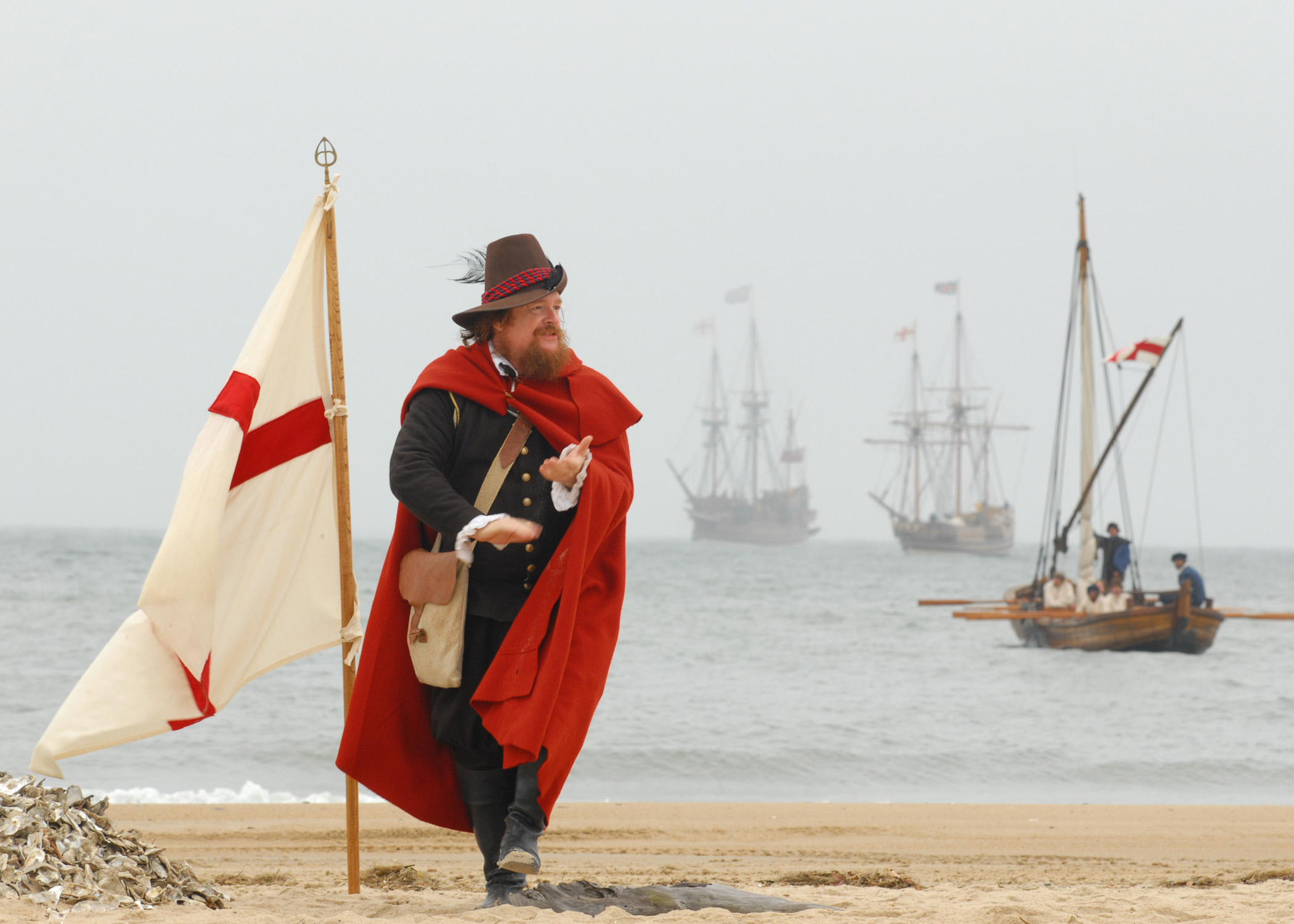
An actor playing John Smith reenacts claiming a beach for Jamestown in the New World

Historians' perspectives on the genre of historical reenactment is mixed. On the one hand, some historians cite reenactment as a way for ordinary people to understand and engage with the narratives about the past in ways that academic history fails to do—namely, that it presents straightforward and entertaining narratives, and allows people to more fully "embody" the past. Rather than confining the production of historical narratives to academia, some argue that this "history from below" provides an important public service to educating the public about past events, serving to "enliven history for millions who turn a blind or bored eye on monuments and museums."

Other historians critique the anachronisms present in reenactment and cite the impossibility of truly retrieving and reproducing the past from the vantage point of the present; "We are not past but present people, with experience, knowledge, feelings, and aims previously unknown," writes Lowenthal, and however impeccably we attempt to bring back the past, everything is filtered through our modern lens and senses. Further, others worry that the focus on historical accuracy in the details, such as dress, obscure the broader historical themes that are critical for audiences to understand; this worry is more acute for certain forms of reenactment, such as American Civil War reenactment, that elicit strong feelings and have real impacts in the present-day world. By focusing on the accuracy of details, some worry, the discussion of the war's causes, such as the end of slavery, are confined to the margins.

Further, under the guise of adhering to the past, some worry, the true, underlying purposes of some reenactments can be obscured; namely, that some reenactors defend not only their prescribed side, but also their side's beliefs: as one reenactor put it, "I do this because I believe in what they believed in ... The real pure hobby is not just looking right; it's thinking right." In response to this, some historians call for a more "authentic" approach to presenting the past, wherein the impacts of that representation on present-day society are honestly presented so as not to give an inaccurate picture of the past. "Historical authenticity resides not in fidelity to an alleged past", cautions an anthropologist, but in being honest about how the present represents that past."

More recently, some scholars have noted an increase in collaboration between reenactors and academic historians. At the International Congress on Medieval Studies in Kalamazoo, Michigan, reenactment groups have at times led demonstration sessions, including iron-smelting and the performance of staged dueling events.

== Criticism ==
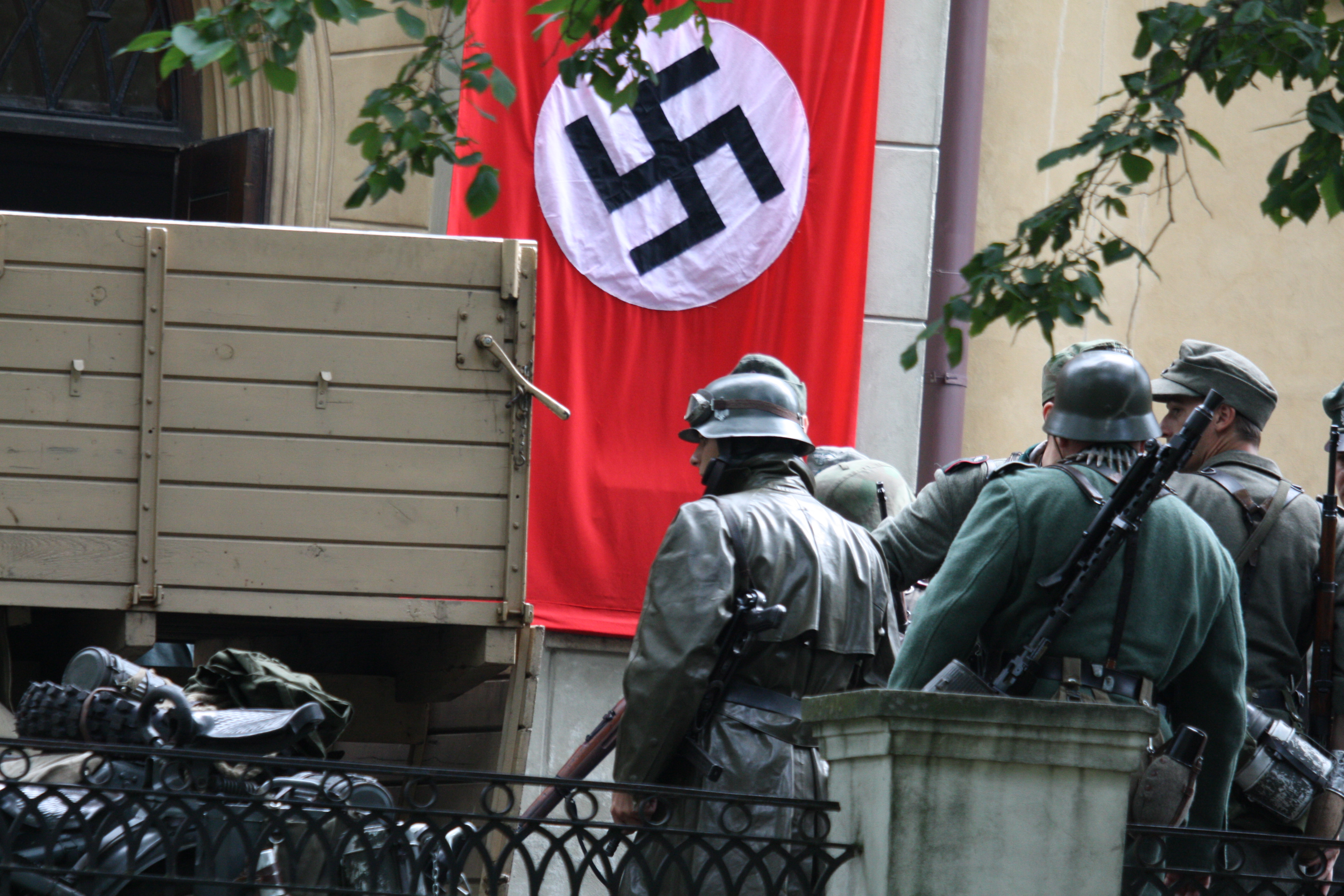
Wehrmacht reenactors near a flag of Nazi Germany during a reenactment of the Warsaw Uprising in Mokotów

There are a number of criticisms made about reenactment. Many point out that the average age of reenactors is generally far higher than the average age of soldiers in most conflicts. Few reenactment units discriminate based on age and physical condition.

In the United States, reenactors are overwhelmingly white. In Civil War reenactments, African-American characters, both enslaved and free, are underrepresented. In 2013, five black reenactors at the 150th anniversary event at Gettysburg constituted "the largest bloc of black civilians anyone had ever seen at an event whose historical basis was full of black civilians... Astonished spectators stopped them constantly, usually assuming they were portraying enslaved people."

Jenny Thompson's book Wargames discusses the "fantasy farb", or tendency of reenactors to gravitate towards "elite" units such as commandos, paratroopers, or Waffen-SS units. This results in under-representation in the reenactment community of what were the most common types of military troops in the period being reenacted. The question has arisen among North American reenactors, but similar issues exist in Europe. For example, in Britain, a high proportion of Napoleonic War reenactors perform as members of the 95th Rifles (perhaps due to the popularity of the fictional character of Richard Sharpe), and medieval groups have an over-proportion of plate-armoured soldiers.

Some veterans have criticized military reenactment as glorifying "what is literally a human tragedy", with one World War II veteran remarking in 1988, "If they knew what a war was like, they'd never play at it."

Some feminist critiques of certain kinds of reenactment, such as Civil War reenactment, "builds up a prosthetic symbolic male white body, embedded in an archaic racialized gender system: the clothing and the tools normally intensify male whiteness. Thus, even if the outer appearance of the uniformed female reenactor is flawless, her participation is deemed unacceptable by most male reenactors." Some reenactments more recently have allowed women to participate as combatants as long as their appearance can pass as male from a specified distance.

Reenactors may be accused of being, or actually be, aligned with the political beliefs that some of the reenacted armies fought for, such as Nazism or the Confederate South. For example, U.S. politician Rich Iott's participation in a World War II reenactment in which he was in the group that portrayed the German 5th SS Panzer Division Wiking side excited media criticism during his 2010 Congressional campaign. Similar accusations have been made against Igor Girkin, a Russian reenactor who has led Russian-aligned forces in the Russo-Ukrainian War. In 2017, in the weeks following a far-right rally in Charlottesville, Virginia at which a neo-Nazi killed a counterprotester, some reenactors complained about—as one reporter put it—"the co-opting of the [Civil] war by neo-Nazis."

== See also ==
- List of historical reenactment groups
- Live action role-playing game
- History of physical training and fitness
- MilSim
- Cosplay
- Little Woodham
- Experimental archaeology
- Historical reconstruction
