= Crucible Industries =

American company which develops and manufactures specialty steels

- Type: Limited liability company
- Industry: Steel
- Founded: 1900
- Defunct: 2025
- Headquarters: Solvay, New York, a suburb of Syracuse
- Area served: Global
- Key people: John Shiesley, President
- Products: Specialty steels: CPM High Speed Steel; CPM Stainless Tool Steel; CPM Tool Steel; High-speed steel Stainless steel Tool steel
- Number of employees: 550 (2009)
- Website: CrucibleIndustries.com

Crucible Industries, commonly known as Crucible, was an American company which developed and manufactured specialty steels, and was the sole producer of a line of sintered steels known as Crucible Particle Metallurgy (CPM) steels. The company produced high speed, stainless and tool steels for the automotive, cutlery, aerospace, and machine tool industries.

Crucible's history spanned over 100 years, and the company inherited some of its ability to produce high-grade steel from England beginning in the late 1800s. Thirteen crucible-steel companies merged in 1900 to become the largest producer of crucible steel in the United States, and this company evolved into a corporation with 1,400 employees in several states.

Crucible declined in tandem with the automotive industry during the 1980s, recovering over the next decade. Although the company entered bankruptcy in 2009, JP Industries of Cleveland revived it as Crucible Specialty Metals Division to continue producing specialty steels at its original site.

Some of Crucible's products were manufactured using a powder metallurgy process (their CPM process), resulting in steels with superior mechanical properties. These steels found specialized scientific and industrial applications and were also favored by knife makers for the production of blades which are tough, hard and corrosion resistant.

== History ==
The Crucible Steel Company of America was formed from the merger of thirteen crucible-steel companies in 1900. This, known as "the great consolidation of 1900", inspired other steel companies to form U.S. Steel a year later. From 1900 through the 20th century, Crucible developed and patented new steels, and brought new steel-production methods to the United States. C. H. Halcomb, Jr. was Crucible's first president and general manager. Two years later, he left Crucible, building the Halcomb Steel mill next door (where he installed the first electric-arc melting furnace in the U.S.).

In 1911 Crucible acquired Halcomb Steel, merging the Halcomb plant with the new Sanderson plant to form the Sanderson-Halcomb Works. In 1955, it began producing vacuum-arc-remelted steels, becoming the first company to use this process commercially. By 1939, Crucible was the largest producer of tool steel in the United States, making over 400 products (more than any other steel company). It had nine mills in four states, two coal mines, a water company and a half-interest in a Mesabi ore mine.

From 1968 to 1984, Crucible was owned by Colt Industries. In 1985, its salaried employees bought it back. By then, the company was known as Crucible Materials Corporation. Fourteen hundred employees worldwide worked for a number of companies, including Crucible Specialty Metals in Solvay, New York; Trent Tube in East Troy, Wisconsin; Crucible Magnetics in Elizabethtown, Kentucky; Crucible Compaction Metals Operations in Oakdale, Pennsylvania; the Cancer Research Center in Pittsburgh, and Crucible Limited in Sheffield, England. In 1989, the number of employees was reduced to 600 after a strike.

The 1980s saw layoffs and plant closures across the U.S.; more than 200,000 workers lost their jobs, and more than 400 mills and divisions of plants (including Crucible's Midland plant) closed. In 1984, Crucible made the titanium alloy used in the artificial heart implanted by Robert Jarvik, and donated corrosive-resistant steel used to help renovate the Statue of Liberty.

During the 1990s, Crucible expanded its operations to Canada, working with General Motors, and building a 35,000-square-foot (3,300 m^{2}) facility with newly patented smelting and processing equipment costing $25 million. Although the number of employees increased to about 1,400, from 2001 to 2003, 200 were laid off.

In 2004, Crucible entered the knife market, and in May 2009, the company filed for Chapter 11 bankruptcy. That October, JP Industries (a private equity group) purchased the operating assets of the Crucible Specialty Metals Division, formed Crucible Industries, and restarted the Geddes steel mill.

After filing for bankruptcy a second time in 2024, Crucible became defunct after many of their assets were sold to Erasteel in 2025.

=== Company names ===
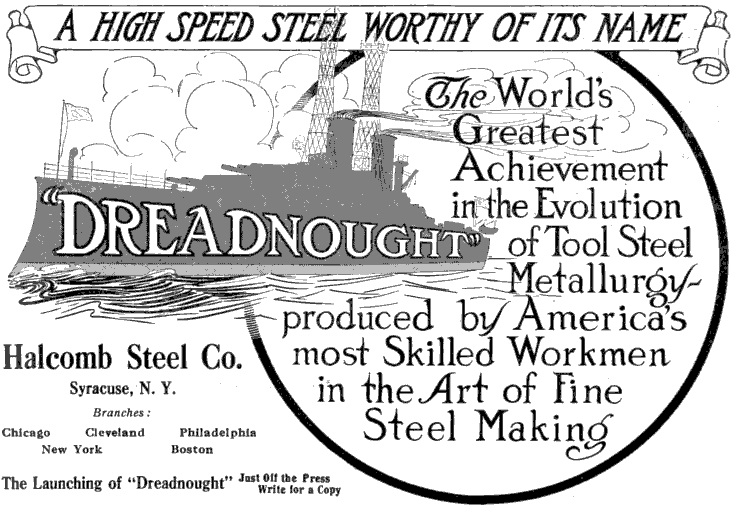
1913 Halcomb Steel Company advertisement

A number of steel companies have operated in Syracuse, maintaining Crucible's intellectual property and patents. In 1870, William A. Sweet founded the Sweet Iron Works. Sanderson Brothers of Sheffield, England, bought the Sweet Iron Works for U.S. production in 1876, renaming the steelworks Sanderson. In 1900, Sanderson's Syracuse steelworks merged into the Crucible Steel Company of America. In 1946, the Sanderson and Halcomb steelworks were renamed the Sanderson-Halcomb Works, later becoming the Syracuse Works of Crucible Steel. In 1968, Crucible became Colt's Crucible Specialty Metals Division. Colt consolidated its basic-materials group into the Crucible Materials Corporation in 1983.

=== Founding companies ===
According to ExplorePAHistory.com, "By 1877, the region's fourteen medium-scale crucible steel factories produced nearly three-fourths of the nation's output. Metal-shaping factories across the country depended on cutting tools made of crucible steel through the 1920s, when electric steel furnaces gained prominence." Three companies which merged to form Crucible into the largest U.S. crucible-steel-producing company were:

- Sanderson Brothers began producing steel in Sheffield, England in 1776. In 1873, it was using a gas-fired crucible melting furnace. Sanderson sold its Syracuse operation to Crucible, expanding its English company with the purchase of Samuel Newbould and Company.
- Hussey, Wells and Company of Pittsburgh, founded in 1859, was the first company in America to manufacture crucible steel. Its partners were Curtis G. Hussey (who formed the Pittsburgh and Boston Mining Corporation to mine copper) and Thomas Marshall Howe (banker, investor, Congressman, assistant adjutant general of Pennsylvania and the first president of the Pittsburgh Chamber of Commerce. Thomas' son, George, helped form Crucible. Hussey and James M. Cooper formed C. G. Hussey and Company to roll and market copper. Before merging with Crucible, Hussey, Wells and Company became Howe, Brown and Company when George joined his father.
- Park, Brother and Company of Pittsburgh, founded in 1860, was the second company to produce crucible steel in the U.S. James Park, Jr. and the elder David E. Park began the company after working with their father for twenty years. In 1857, James Jr. founded the Lake Superior Copper Works to sheath ship hulls. After encountering Hussey, Howe and Wells, he followed them into manufacturing crucible steel. Park built the Black Diamond (Park) Steel Works, and had interests in a suspension-bridge company and several banks. David's sons, David E. Jr., William G. and James H. Park, led in forming Crucible. In 1900, Park Steel was the largest producer of crucible and special-purpose open-hearth steels in the world.

The other companies which formed Crucible were:

- Aliquippa Steel Company, several miles north of Pittsburgh on the Ohio River
- Anderson, DuPuy and Company
- Beaver Falls Steel Works
- Burgess Steel and Iron Works
- Crescent Steel of Pittsburgh (founded 1865)
- Cumberland Steel and Tin Plate Company
- Isaac Jones' Pittsburgh Steel Works (later Anderson, Deputy and Company; founded 1845)
- LaBelle Steel Company (formerly Reiter, Hartman and Company) of Allegheny, Pennsylvania (founded 1863)
- Singer, Nimick and Company of Pittsburgh (founded 1848)
- Spaulding and Jennings Company

=== Timeline ===
The following timeline provides references and events in the context of Crucible's history. Its primary source is the Syracuse Post-Standard archives, with other sources noted.

=== Sanderson Brothers and Company ===
1776: The Naylor and Sanderson Steel Mill was established in Sheffield, England, and began producing tool steel with the crucible method. By 1873 it was trading as Sanderson Brothers and Company, and using a gas-fired-crucible melting furnace.

In 1876 Sanderson Brothers and Company bought Sweet Iron Works, which had been established in 1870 in Syracuse. Sheffield was known for its hard, durable steel, and Syracuse was known for its hard steel. Contemporary U.S. tariffs gave Sanderson an incentive for a U.S. operation. In 1878, Sanderson had $450,000 in capital and the following officers: Robert B. Campbell of New York, president; Samuel William Johnson of New York, secretary and William A. Sweet of Syracuse, general manager.

In 1900, thirteen crucible-steel manufacturing companies formed the Crucible Steel Company of America. Sanderson divested itself of its American operation, offering 500,000 shares of stock for $50 million. Crucible's fifth annual report (published in 1905) showed debts of $3.6 million, $2.4 million less than the year before.

=== Halcomb Steel ===
In 1902 C. H. Halcomb Jr., Sanderson's president and general manager, left the company and built the Halcomb Steel mill next to the Sanderson mill. Halcomb installed the first electric arc furnace (EAF) in the United States in 1906. In 1911 the company was acquired by Crucible, which doubled the size of its western branch warehouse (now in Chicago) in 1913.

=== Hoyt-Noe Steel Company ===
By 1913, Thatcher Hoyt and Paul E. Noe formed the Hoyt-Noe Steel Company in Chicago. Hoyt had been representing crucible steels for twenty years; his previous companies included the Braeburn Steel Company, Singer, Nimick and Company and the Sanderson Brothers Steel Company.

=== Crucible ===
Crucible patented the first formally classified high-speed steel, AISI T1 (German 18-0-1), in 1910, and its basic formula was used for the next forty years. After other high-speed steels were produced, T1 remained one of the most commonly used commercial high-speed steels for the next century. The next year Crucible formed the Pittsburg Crucible Steel Company, purchasing a 423-acre (171 ha) site from Midland Steel on the Ohio River near Pittsburgh for $7.5 million to build a new plant. Midland, Pennsylvania became Crucible's planned town.

During the 1920s and 1930s, World War I financier Horace S. Wilkinson oversaw Crucible president Frederick B. Hufnagel, refusing to modernize and controlling the company's finances as he pleased. This ended with the creation of the Security and Exchange Commission in 1934 and Wilkinson's death in 1937. At the beginning of World War II Crucible was the largest producer of tool steels in the United States, manufacturing more types of steel than any other company. The company used thirty metals to make 400 commonly used alloy steels. It had nine mills in New York, New Jersey, Pennsylvania and Ohio, two coal mines, a water company and a half-interest in a Mesabi Range iron ore mine. Now the company's chairman, Hufnagel brought in Raoul Eugene Desvernine as president. With a legal background, Desvernine focused on improving sales. The company had about 15,000 customers, net sales of $60 million and earnings of $4 million in 1937. The following year, Crucible lost $2 million as its sales halved during the recession of 1937–38.

When Crucible sought to borrow money in 1940, the Mellon Security Corporation insisted on a full audit. This resulted in a $40 million revaluation of the company's property and plants (down to $81 million) and the loss of its fiscal surplus. On December 7, 1941, when the U.S. entered World War II, Syracuse was considered the Porretta Terme (Italy's gear-producing center) of America.

In 1945 William P. Snyder Jr., president of Snyder Mining Company of Pittsburgh and a Crucible stockholder, brought in president William H. Colvin Jr. With the board's approval, Colvin closed four of the company's eleven operations and began a $46 million modernization. The Syracuse plants were consolidated in 1946 into the Sanderson-Halcomb Works. In 1949, Crucible began operations in an $18 million sheet and strip mill at the Midland works, becoming the first steel mill to use hot and cold rolling of stainless and high-alloy sheet and strip. Iron Age, manufacturer of the hot reversing mill, called this a transition from a curiosity to standard production practice; ovens on both sides of the rolls could better control the steel's temperature.

When Crucible removed escape clauses from its employee contracts after the war, the company received approval from the United Steelworkers. During the 1950s, shortages of tungsten and vanadium caused by the wartime drive for cheaper alloying metals resulted in the development of AISI M2 high-speed steel. Colt Industries bought Crucible Steel Corporation of America in 1968, and the Syracuse works become Colt's Crucible Specialty Metals Division. In 1975, Crucible began marketing its products in the Soviet Union.

During the 1980s the AISI reported that more than 200,000 steelworkers in the U.S. had lost their jobs, and more than 400 mills and plant divisions were closing (including Crucible's Midland plant near Pittsburgh). Jones & Laughlin Steel bought the Midland plant and merged with Republic Steel to form the LTV Steel Corporation, which went bankrupt.

In 1981 Colt moved the Crucible and Trent Tube Divisions to Syracuse from Pittsburgh, and the following year it began closing its Crucible Steel Plant (laying off 400 workers). In 1983 Colt Industries consolidated its basic-materials group into the Crucible Materials Corporation, with its headquarters in New York City. This was the last year that Crucible Specialty Metals negotiated union contracts without a strike.

In 1984 Crucible manufactured the titanium alloy used in the artificial heart implanted by Robert Jarvik, and donated corrosion-resistant steel for the renovation of the Statue of Liberty. The following year, Crucible Materials Corporation's salaried employees purchased the corporation’s stock in a leveraged buyout and moved its headquarters to Syracuse. The purchase price ($135 million) included the 1,400-employee Crucible Specialty Metals plant in Solvay; Trent Tube in East Troy, Wisconsin; Crucible Magnetics in Elizabethtown, Kentucky; Crucible Compaction Metals Operations in Oakdale, Pennsylvania; Crucible Research Center in Pittsburgh, and Crucible Limited in Sheffield, England.

In 1988, Crucible Specialty Metals modernized its plant and the division employed 1,425 people worldwide. The Crucible Service Centers Division opened its Camillus, New York headquarters in 1989, marketing specialty steel products worldwide. That year, the workers struck; when a contract was signed, only 600 of 1,100 workers were called back to work.

In 1991 Crucible Materials and General Motors' Central Foundry Division begin three years of joint research and development in die casting, tooling and machine elements, and Crucible Materials Corporation purchased Sanderson Specialty Steels of Canada. Two years later union workers rejected a company contract offer, continuing to work. At this time, Crucible employed about 700 union workers. By 1998 CMC employed 820 workers and invested $25 million in a new, 35,000 sq ft (3,300 m^{2}) facility for manufacturing newly patented smelting and processing equipment.

In 2000, the U.S. Department of Labor sued Crucible Materials Corporation over its pension plan for salaried employees. From 2001 to 2003, the corporation laid off 186 salaried and hourly workers on a rotating basis. CMC employed 1,209 workers, 722 union workers and 487 salaried workers in Geddes and its distribution center in Camillus. In 2004 Crucible Specialty Metals entered the knife market, moving its Camillus operation to the Geddes plant.

The corporation filed for Chapter 11 bankruptcy in May 2009, and in October JP Industries (a private equity group in Cleveland) purchased the operating assets of the Crucible Specialty Metals Division and formed Crucible Industries. A month later, the Geddes steel mill was restarted.

In 2010, Crucible partnered with Latrobe Specialty Steel Distribution to market its steels. According to Crucible president James Beckman, "Latrobe Distribution offers everything we wanted in a partner for our CPM grades of steel". Latrobe, with eight locations in North America, is a division of Latrobe Specialty Steel of Latrobe, Pennsylvania. That year Crucible partnered with Robert Zapp Werkstofftechnik, a division of the Zapp Group, to sell Crucible Particle Metallurgy products worldwide except for North America and Japan.

In December 2024, Crucible Industries filed for Chapter 11 bankruptcy for the second time in 15 years. A number of Crucible's assets, including their inventories, intellectual property, and industrial equipment were purchased by Erasteel in February 2025. The company converted their Chapter 11 case to a Chapter 7 bankruptcy liquidation on May 30, 2025, after all assets were sold off.

== Knife design and manufacturing ==
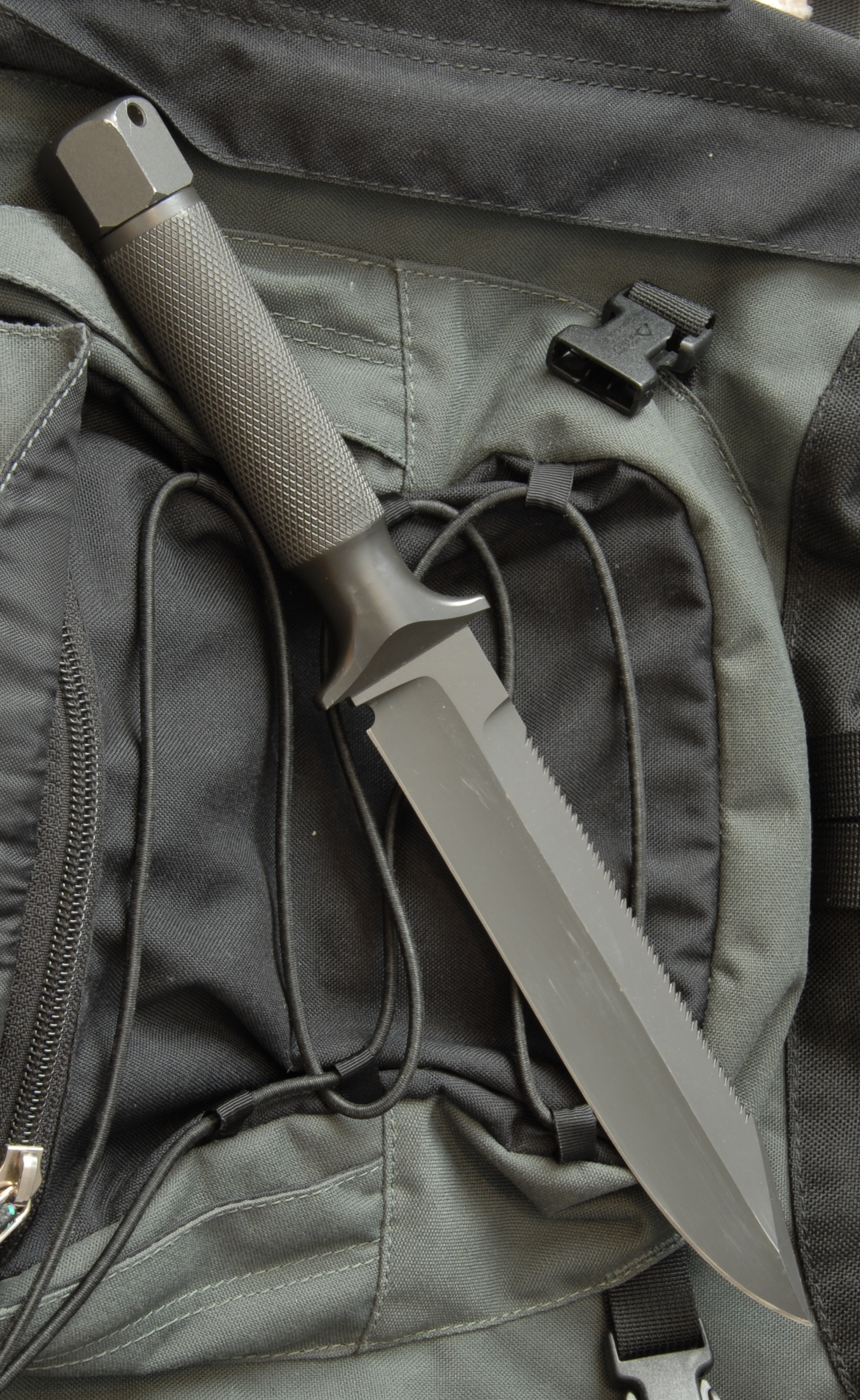
Chris Reeve Knives Mark IV one-piece

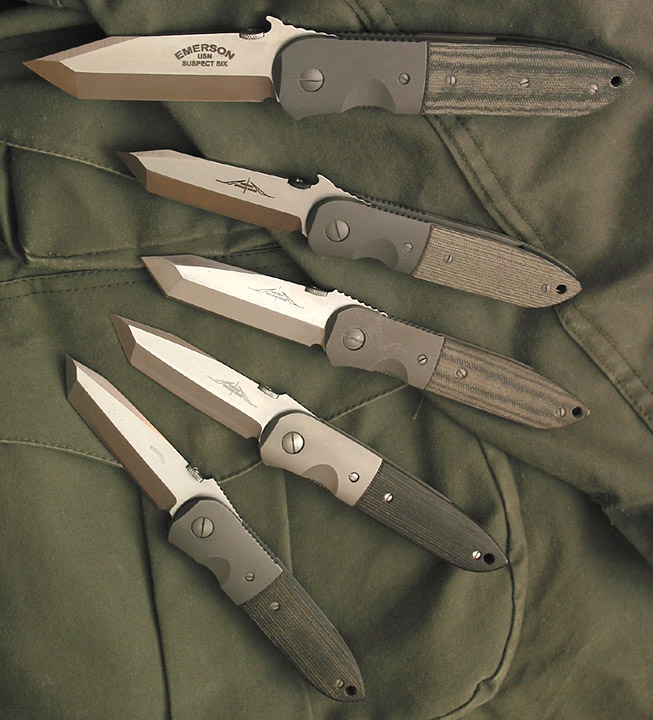
Ernest Emerson's CQC-6 knives

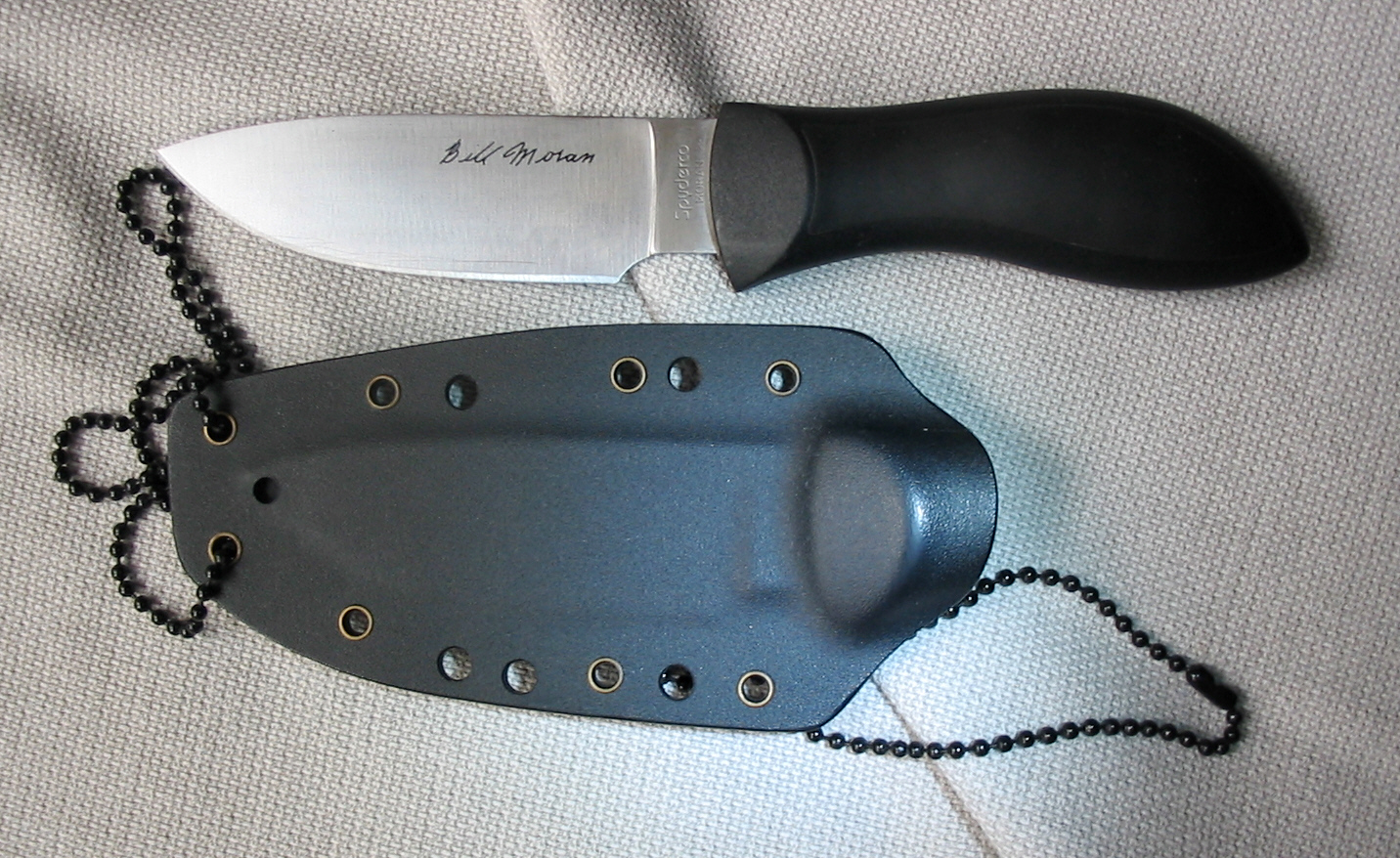
Spyderco's FB02, a Bill Moran drop-point

Many production and custom knife manufacturers use Crucible steels. Chris Reeve collaborated with Dick Barber of Crucible to develop the S30V and S35VN steel alloys, and Chris Reeve Knives uses these and other steels. Bob Loveless introduced 154CM stainless-steel knives in 1972. A founder and president of the Knifemakers' Guild, Loveless has designed for Gerber Knives, Lone Wolf Knives and Beretta. Schrade Cutlery and Spyderco use 154CM, 440C, D2, S30V, S60V and S90V steel, and Ernest Emerson's knives are hard-ground from differentially heat-treated A2 tool steel. Emerson Knives machines blades from 154CM steel, and Mike Snody uses A2, S35V, 154CM and 440C steels. Phill Hartsfield's katana-style blades are hand-ground from A2 tool steel and differentially edge-hardened. Ken Onion's Kershaw's Blur uses CPM S30V steel.

== Products ==
Crucible Particle Metallurgy (CPM) steels are used in the automotive, aerospace and tool industries. The list of blade materials describes several CPM products, and the company's website has data sheets for all of them. The following table includes trademarks of Crucible users.

Product type	Product
CPM® High Speed Steel	M4 HC (HS), REX 20® (HS), REX 45® (HS), REX 54® HS, REX 66® (HS), REX 76® (HS), REX 86® HS, REX 121®, T15 (HS)
CPM® Stainless Tool Steel	154, S110V®, S125V®, S30V®, S35VN®, S45VN® S90V® MagnaCut®
CPM® Tool Steel	1V®, 3V®, 4V®, 9V®, 10V®, 15V®
High Speed	M2, M4, M50
Stainless 300 Series	303, 303 SE, 304L, 316L, 321, 347, Alloy 20, UNS 21800, XM-19
Stainless 400 Series	154CM, 410, 416, 416R, 420, 422, 430, 430F, 431, 440A, 440C
Stainless Precipitation Hardness Grades	17-4, 17-4 SUPER X, VAR 15-5
Tool	A2, CRUWEAR, D2, H13, WR95 (H10 Mod)

Although the following metals add general characteristics to an alloy, its actual characteristics are determined by a number of factors.

Metal	General characteristics
Chromium	Hardness, corrosion resistance, wear resistance
Cobalt	Electrical, hot hardness when used with molybdenum and tungsten
Nickel	Hardness, tensile strength, ductility
Molybdenum	Depth of hardness, toughness, strength at higher temperatures, machineability, weldability
Vanadium	Very fine grain, fatigue resistance, abrasion resistance at average and higher temperatures
Tungsten	Hardness at red heat

=== CPM process ===
Conventional and CPM steel-making smelts ore into steel with an electric arc furnace, refines it by removing some carbon, reducing it by removing the sulphur. Further refining may use argon oxygen decarburization, an implementation of powder metallurgy. The conventional process teems (distributes and pours) the steel into ingot molds. The steel slowly solidifies, allowing the elements to segregate into non-uniform patterns at the microscopic level.

The CPM process pours molten steel through a small nozzle. High-pressure gas atomizes the liquid stream into a spray which rapidly cools the steel into a uniform powder. The powder then goes into high-pressure containers and is heated at forge temperatures to press the powder into ingots; this is known as hot isostatic pressing (HIP), and the resulting metal is uniform. Both processes then use hot or cold rolling to toughen the steel and mill it into finished products.

== Publications ==
=== Cataloged Crucible ===
- Crucible Steel Company of America, Condensed suggestions for steel workers. BiblioBazaar (1902, reprint 2010) ISBN 9781175479105
- Crucible Steel Company of America, High Speed Steel. (1912, reprint 2011) Nabu Press, ISBN 9781272198145
- Crucible Steel Company of America, Crucible Steel Company of America (1925) ASIN B002683KAG

=== Crucible ===
- Crucible Steel Company of America, The Treatment of Steel. (1902)
- Crucible Steel Company of America, Sanderson Bros. Steel Works. (1911)
- Crucible Steel Company of America, Steels and Alloys for Special Purposes (1912)
- Underhill, Earl M.; Crucible Steel Company of America, Permanent magnet design: including a discussion of permanent magnet measurements (1943)
- Payson, Peter; Crucible Steel Company of America, The Annealing of Steel. (1944) Payson
- Crucible Steel Company of America, The Fabricator's Handbook - How to Fabricate Rezistal Stainless Steels Produced by Crucible Steel Company of America (1955)
- Mathews, John A. (1872–1935), Crucible Steel Company of America. Central Research Laboratory. Library (1959)
- Banerjee, B. R.; Hauser, J. J.; Crucible Steel Company of America, Effect of Processing Variables on Crack Propagation of High-strength Steels and Titanium: Fracture Micromechanics in High-strength Steels, Crucible Steel Company of America, Central Research Laboratory (1963)
- Crucible Steel Company of America. Library; Ussack, P., Continuous Casting of Steel. (3 ed. 1964) Volume 12, Library. Bibliographical series.

=== Crucible and the U.S. Air Force ===
- Tarwater, J. P.; Dulis, Edward J.; Wright Air Development Center; Crucible Steel Company of America, Investigation of Fe-Mn-Cr-N-C System for Heat Resistance and Oxidation Resistance Between 1200 F and 2000 F Wright Air Development Center, Air Research and Development Command, U.S. Air Force (1957).
- Bhat, Gopal K.; Philip, T. V.; Nehrenberg, Alvin E.; Steven, G.; Crucible Steel Company of America; Wright Air Development Center, United States. Wright Air Development Division. A Study of the Metallurgical Properties that are Necessary for Satisfactory Bearing Performance and the Development of Improved Bearing Alloys for Service Up to 1000 F. Defense Technical Information Center (1957).
- Crucible Steel Company of America; Moskovitz, A.; Redmerski, L., Corrosion of superalloys by selected fused salts Wright Air Development Division, Air Research and Development Command, U.S. Air Force (1960).
- Crucible Steel Company of America. Central Research Laboratory, Research on Workable Refractory Alloys of Tungsten, Tantalum, Molybdenun, and Columbium Aeronautical Systems Division, Air Force Systems Command, U.S. Air Force (1961).

== See also ==
- Methods of steel production:
  - Metallurgy cementation process
  - Crucible steel processes
  - Open-hearth furnace process, the Siemens-Martin process
- Steel industry
  - Crucible steel
  - Blast furnace
  - Steel mill or Steelworks.
- Industry in Syracuse, New York.

== Bibliography ==
- Bwank, James Moore, History of the Manufacturing of Iron in All Ages (1892); publisher: American Iron and Steel Association, Philadelphia, Pennsylvania
- Gilmer, Harrison, Birth of the American Crucible Steel Industry (1953).
- Kaufmann, Dwight W., Crucible, The Story of a Steel Company (1986).
- Kennedy, Richard; Roberts, George Adam (1998). Tool Steels (5th ed. ed.). Materials Park, OH: ASM International. ISBN 1615032010.
