= Benchmade =

American knife manufacturer

Benchmade Knife Company, Inc.
- Type: Private
- Industry: Manufacturing
- Founded: 1979; 47 years ago
- Founder: Les deAsis
- Headquarters: Oregon City, Oregon
- Key people: Jon deAsis, President and CEO
- Products: Knives, pens, rescue tools
- Number of employees: 380
- Website: benchmade.com

The Benchmade Knife Company is an American knife manufacturer based out of Oregon City, Oregon.

== History ==
Benchmade originally started in California in 1979 as Bali-Song, then changed their name to Pacific Cutlery Corporation in the early 1980s, before settling on "Benchmade" in 1987. In 1990, the company moved to Clackamas, Oregon, to be closer to existing knife production companies in that area. As part of the process of moving their production from outside vendors to in-house production facilities, the company moved again in 1996, to their own 35,000 square foot facility in Oregon City, Oregon.

Benchmade became known primarily as a manufacturer of butterfly knives, or balisongs, and they continue to be manufactured under their registered trademark name "Ba“i-Song". ”Benchmade's original Bali-Song design by Jody Samson was awarded Blade Magazine's Knife of the Year Award in 1979. This connection to butterfly knives is the inspiration for the butterfly symbol in their logo.

Founder Les deAsis died February 21, 2020, following a stroke. His wife Roberta deAsis, took over the position of President and CEO following his death, and was succeeded by their son Jon deAsis in October of 2020.

== Products ==
Blade steels such as 154CM, D2, CPM S30V steel, CPM S90V steel, CPM 20CV, N690 and M390 are used on many models. Benchmade also uses high speed M2 and CPM M4 tool steels.

Benchmade receives a significant amount of revenue from selling restricted-sales knives to the military and law enforcement. They produce a diverse selection of "auto", or switchblade knives, along with a range of hunting, fishing, utility and miscellaneous knives, though balisongs remain a core product. In recent years most balisongs have been discontinued, with the only remaining Balisong in production being the 85.

Benchmade has three different knife classes. The first class is the Blue Class, also known as the Recreation class. This type of Benchmade knife is made for typical use by the everyday person. The next class is the Black Class, also known as the Professional class. This type of Benchmade knife is made for military, law enforcement, and public safety workers. The last class is the Gold class, also known as the Collector class. This class of Benchmade knife is made for collectors and are limited edition.

Benchmade has a patent on the locking mechanism used in most of the switchblades they produce. Benchmade additionally holds an exclusive license on use of the McHenry / Williams "AXIS Lock", a spring-operated locking mechanism used in both automatic and manual action models.

The designers are Jody Samson, Ernest Emerson, Allen Elishewitz, Mel Pardue, Bill McHenry, Mike Snody, Jason Williams, Warren Osborne, Ken Steigerwalt, and Bob Lum. Several production Benchmade models based on the work of these designers have become influential within the industry.

Some of the Benchmade knife models include:

- Benchmade Griptilian
- Benchmade Freek
- Benchmade Crooked River
- Benchmade Bushcrafter
- Benchmade Infidel
- Benchmade SOCP
- Benchmade 556 Mini Griptilian
- Benchmade Contego (discontinued)
- Benchmade 940 Osborne
- Benchmade BKC Bedlam Axis
- Benchmade Serum (Discontinued)
- Benchmade Mini Barrage
- Benchmade Model 42
- Benchmade Model 533 Mini-Bugout
- Benchmade Model 535 Bugout
- Benchmade Model 537 Bailout
- Benchmade Model 4400 Casbah
- Benchmade Model 51 Morpho

== Awards and honors ==
Benchmade has won several awards and recognition for product innovation and design.

- The Shooting Industry Academy of Excellence Knife of the Year Winner, Benchmade 915 Triage (2011)
- Field & Stream Best Fixed Blade Knife Winner, Benchmade 162 Bushcrafter (2013)
- Kokatat American Made Outdoor Gear 'Sassy' Award Winner, Benchmade (2014)
- 50 Campfires Gear of the Year Award Winner, Benchmade 551 Griptilian (2014)
- Knife News Dealer's Choice Best Overall Award Winner, Benchmade (2016)
- Oregon Manufacturing Awards, Product Innovation Category Winner, Benchmade (2017)

== Gallery ==
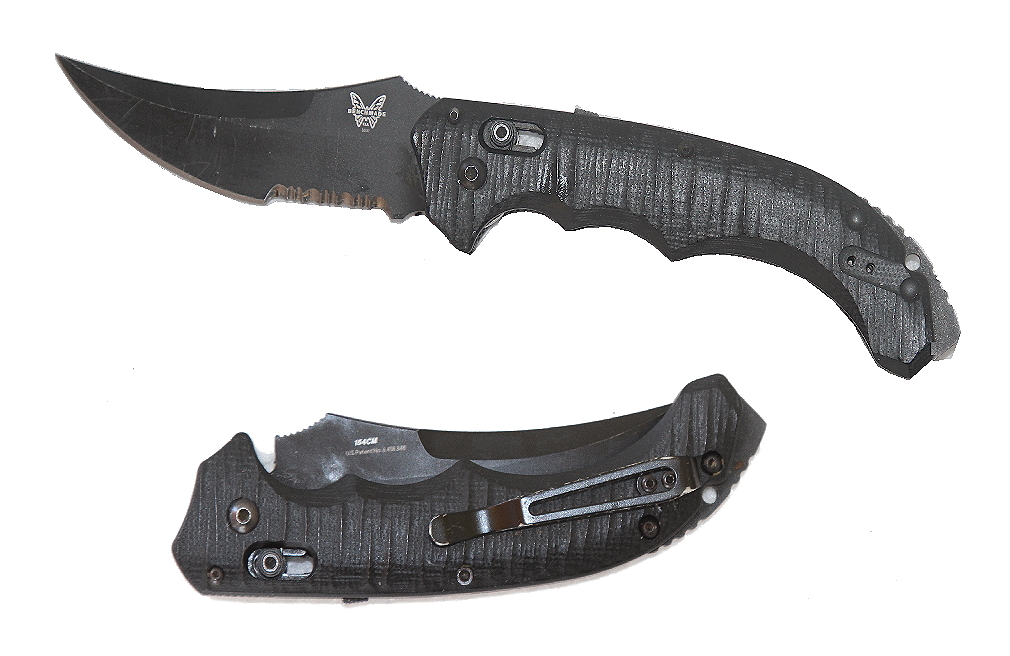
Benchmade Bedlam Auto with CM 154 steel patented Axis Lock

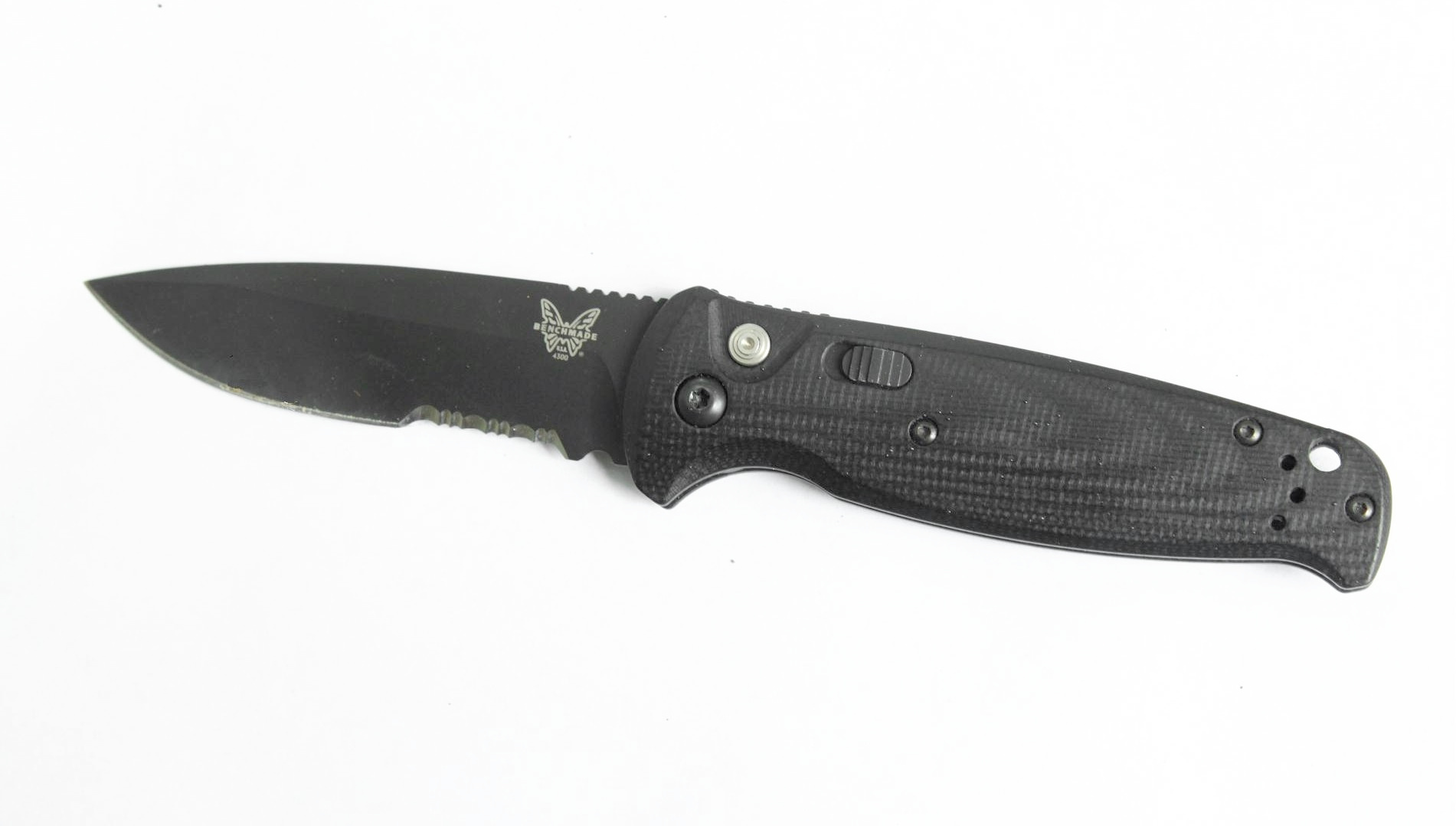
Benchmade 4300 CLA Composite Lite Auto. Auto knife push button operation with side-mounted safety, reversible clip. Length 7.85- inches Blade length 3.4 inches. Blade Material CM154.

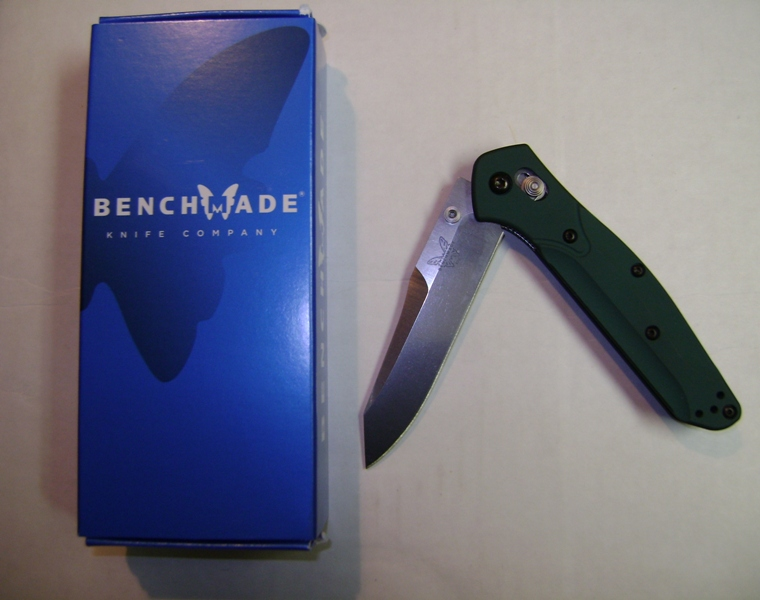
Benchmade 940 Osborne folding knife

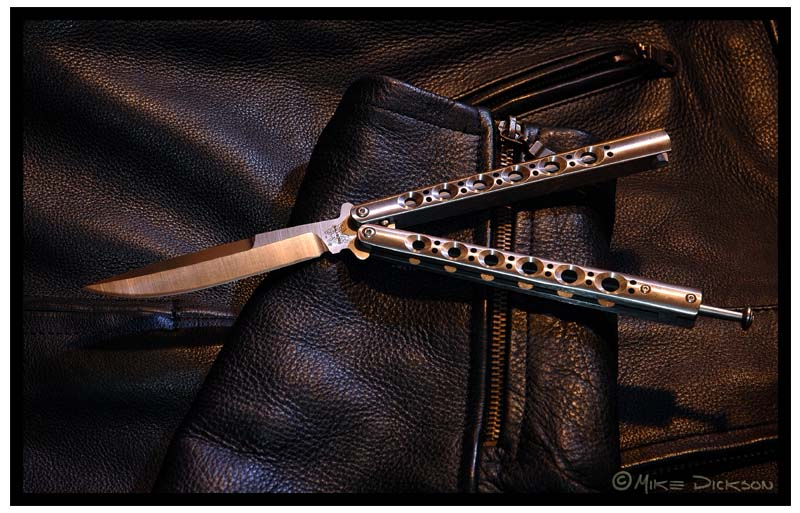
Benchmade Model 42 butterfly knife

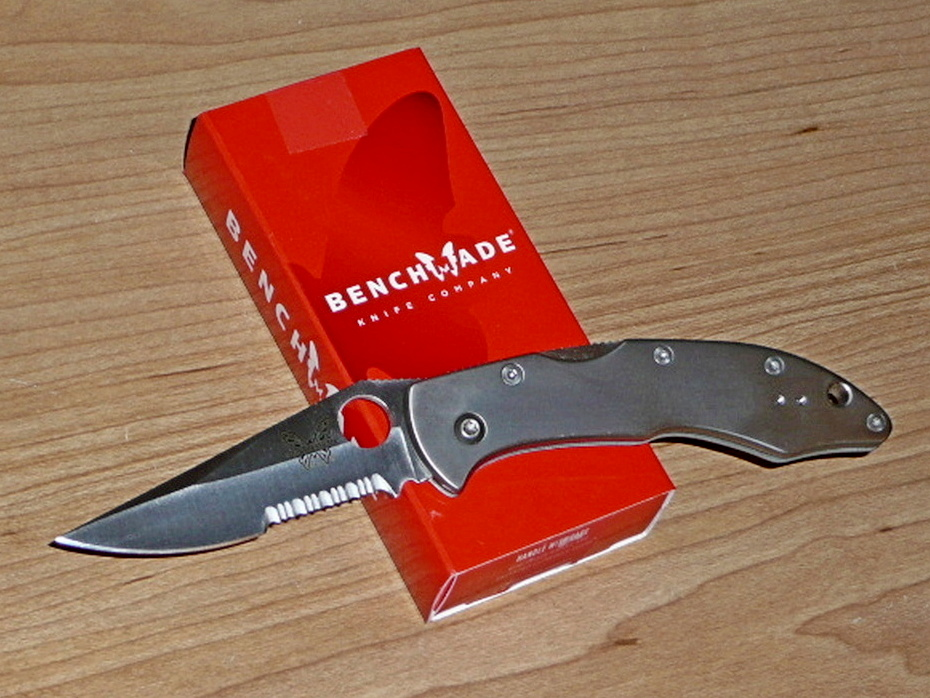
Benchmade Mini TI Pika II with Titanium handle scales and lanyard hole. Blade material: 9Cr13CoMoV (Model no.10402S-1)
