= Combat reenactment =

Form of historical reenactment

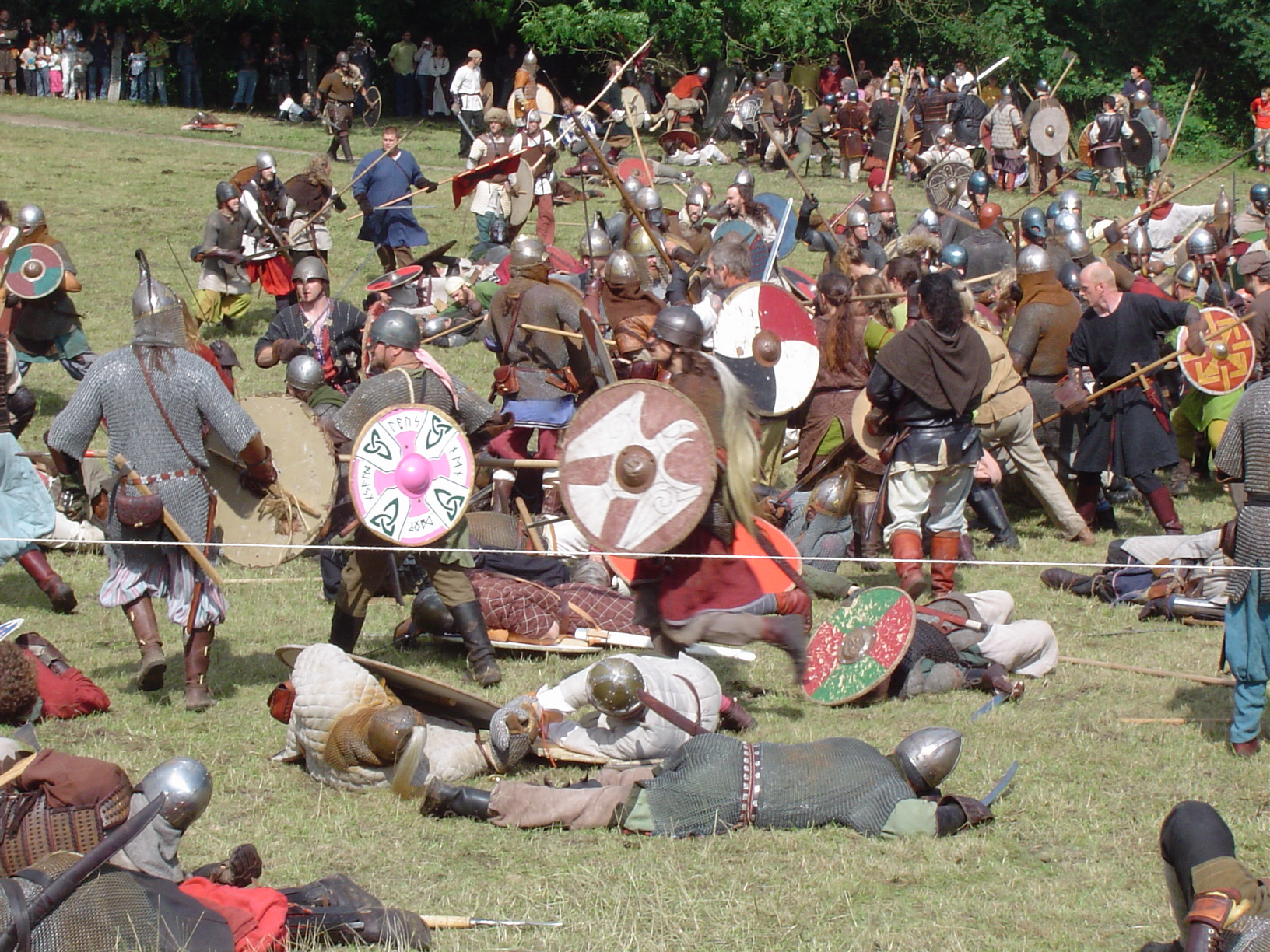
Reenactment of a Viking battle. Denmark, 2005.

Combat reenactment is a side of historical reenactment which aims to depict historical forms of combat. This may refer to either single combat, melees involving small groups, or nearly full-scale battles with hundreds of participants.

Depending on the intended effect, performances may have the aim of presenting historical martial arts reconstruction, or just offer entertainment, and different groups have different standards of authenticity.

== Historical martial arts demonstrations ==
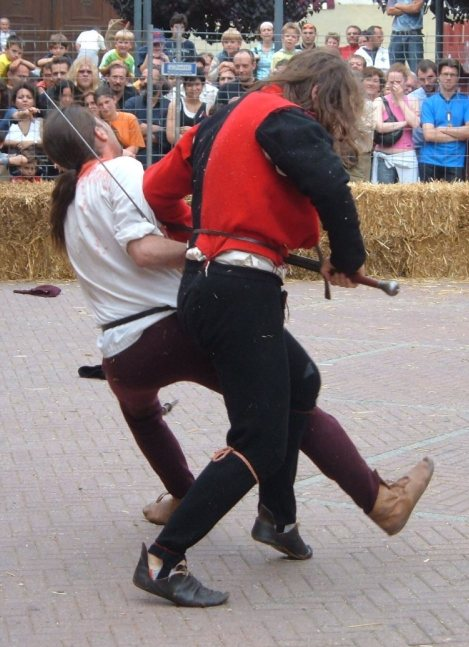
15th century German longsword demonstration at Furor et Ferrum 2007 (the action is the final stage of a "going-through" with a throw).

Demonstration of historical fencing begins with Alfred Hutton in the 1890s.

The Association for Renaissance Martial Arts distinguishes the following modes of historical martial arts demonstrations:

- Theatrical Fencing (stage-combat, performance fighting) in the sense of a performance art, not a martial art, although relying on a foundation of martial techniques and principles, serving the end of dramatic entertainment.
- Arranged Performance Fighting, as distinct from both theatrical fencing and historical swordsmanship practiced as a martial art, having the purpose of demonstration and education. Such performances are offered by a number of museums, including the Higgins Armory Museum, Worcester, MA, USA and the Royal Armouries, Leeds, UK.
- Mock-Fighting & Martial Sports, including simulated battle presentations and tournament bouts in living history or live-action role-playing games with special "combat rules".

== Joust ==
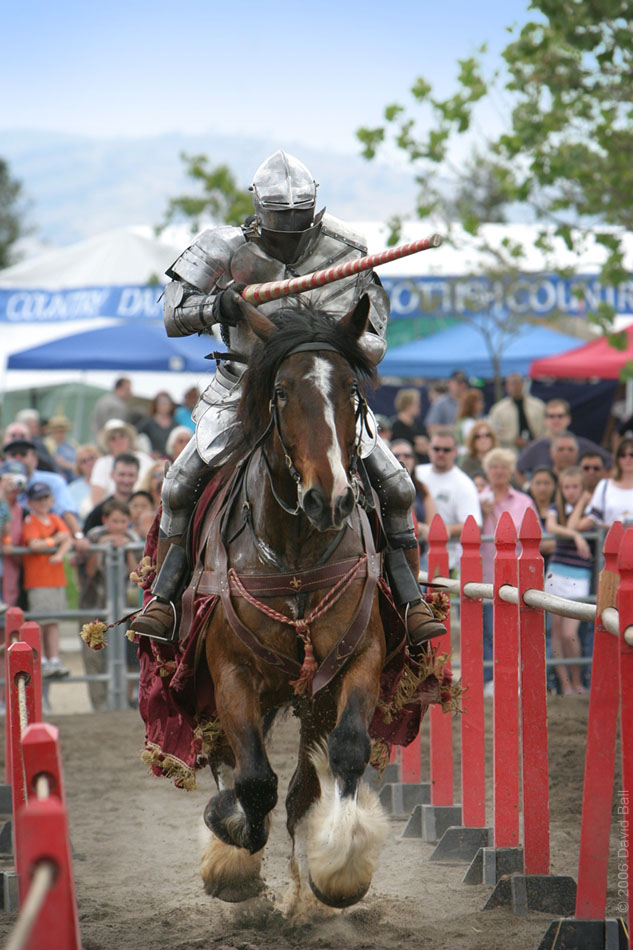
A contemporary knight jousting at a Renaissance Fair in Livermore, California, 2006.

Today, tent pegging is the only form of jousting officially recognized by the International Federation for Equestrian Sports. Ring jousting became the official state sport of Maryland in 1962 and was the first official sport of any American state. The Italian town of Arezzo continues to hold an annual jousting tournament, which dates to the Crusades.. Modern theatrical medieval-style jousting competitions are popular at American Renaissance fairs and similar festivals, and feature riders on horseback attempting various feats of skill with the lance, which may not always have a basis in history.

== Battle reenactment ==
Reenactment of battles is a major and popular component of historical reenactment.

Due to the number of participants involved, most reenacted battles cannot be choreographed in any detail, and safety guidelines or "combat rules" are imposed on participants instead, prohibiting most realistic actions. Some reenactment battles take the form of a competition, where the two "armies" try to defeat each other within the actions permitted by the combat rules.

Battles in film are not inhibited by such restrictions, due to the possibilities of cutting and closeup. They are fully choreographed, and are not performed in a single go but divided into individual sequences.

== Combat as interactive martial art ==
The Society for Creative Anachronism fighting is based on Medieval fighting on foot, in the spirit of tournament fighting with wooden swords. The armor is handmade and based on historical artifacts. Unlike most reenactment events, the events are not pre-determined. It's a participatory sport; the fighters win or lose a bout, much like Karate or Judo.

== Combat rules ==
- Codex Belli
- Early Medieval Alliance

== Equipment ==
Since the 1990s, an increasing number of companies offers replicas of historical arms and armour. Blade weapons used for combat reenactment are unsharpened, and specialized sparring weapons (e.g. Albion's "Maestro Line") also have rounded points. Blunt, flail and staff weapons are more problematic since the replica essentially has the same effectiveness as the "serious" version, unless rattan or latex weapons are employed, which in turn lack the characteristics of the originals and induce handling techniques inconsistent with the weapons they are supposed to represent.

== See also ==
- Armored combat (sport)
