= Tony Swatton =

British-American blacksmith

- Born: Hammersmith, London, England
- Occupation: Blacksmith
- Website: swordandstone.com

Tony Swatton is a British-American blacksmith and gemcutter from Hammersmith, London, England. He is best known for creating props for films and television programmes. He was also the host of the popular webseries, Man at Arms.

== Biography ==
Swatton is a self-educated blacksmith and a trained jeweller. When he was young, he used to cut gems and later expanded his skillset to include silversmithing. When he was 15, he met Jody Samson who had worked on the Conan the Barbarian film, and started to swap gems with Samson for knives. Unable to afford a knife, Swatton made one out of a file and showed it to Samson. Samson told him that it would break easily, as he hadn't used the right metal or type of treatment.

When he was 17, Swatton attended a renaissance fair where he observed another blacksmith making armour. Swatton then made copies of the blacksmith's equipment and used them to make his own helmet. When he was 26, he opened his first shop in North Hollywood called Sword and Stone where he sold products to Euro Disney and Michael Jackson. In 1991, he was employed to do his first film work on Hook. Between 1994 and 1998, Samson worked in Swatton's shop.

== Webseries ==
Swatton was involved in Man at Arms after he was approached by the director. The director was looking for a blacksmith who could create twelve particular weapons and approached Swatton. Swatton accepted as he had previously built prop versions of several of the weapons that had been listed to be created by the director. In the webseries, Swatton created real versions of fictional weapons and armour. Some of his creations included the Zenith Blade from League of Legends and Wolverine's claws from X-Men. The last episode featuring the creations of Tony aired in June 2014.

Beginning in April 2015, Swatton has starred in Blizzard Entertainment's intermittent Azeroth Armory webseries, in which he forges iconic weapons from the Warcraft video game series, with episodes typically released as part of the marketing push for new World of Warcraft expansions.

== Personal ==
Swatton has a fiancée. In 2013, he obtained American citizenship. Swatton was once a member of the Society for Creative Anachronism but left after other members wouldn't acknowledge hits on them from Swatton in mock battles, which led to him having to use force which caused Swatton to leave because he said he didn't want to be a bully.

== Film credits ==
Swatton has been credited and even gone uncredited in many films and TV shows for his contribution to the props departments, making weapons or armour for them, some of the credited performances that he has been given are as follows:

Year	Title	Credit
2020	Prop Culture	himself, episode: "Pirates of the Caribbean: Curse of the Black Pearl"
2012	The Hunger Games	weapons: props – uncredited
2011	Thor	props
2011	Sucker Punch	weapons
2010	Alice in Wonderland	sword maker – uncredited
2007	Beowulf	weapons
2007	Epic Movie	weapon fabricator
2006	Pirates of the Caribbean: Dead Man's Chest	sword maker
2005	Into the Blue	sword maker
2005	The Legend of Zorro	sword maker
2004	Hellboy	sword maker
2004	Scooby-Doo 2: Monsters Unleashed	armorer
2004	Spider-Man 2	knife maker
2004	Blade: Trinity	armorer
2004	Van Helsing	armorer
2003	Pirates of the Caribbean: The Curse of the Black Pearl	sword maker
2003	The Last Samurai	sword maker
2003	The Matrix Reloaded	sword maker
2003	Jeepers Creepers 2	armourer
2003	Holes	knife maker
2002	The Ring	jeweller
2002	Spider-Man	sword maker
2002	Men in Black 2	sword maker – uncredited
2001	Ocean's Eleven	jeweller – uncredited
2001	Rush Hour 2	sword maker
2000	The Patriot	sword maker
2000	Rules of Engagement	knife maker
1999	Angel	weapons
1998	Blade	sword maker – uncredited
1997	Spawn	armourer
1997	Buffy the Vampire Slayer	weapons
1997	Face/Off	knife maker
1996	Sabrina, the Teenage Witch (1996 TV series)	sword maker
1996	The Crow: City of Angels	knife maker
1996	The Cable Guy	armourer – uncredited
1995	Casper	armourer
1994	The shadow	helmet maker
1993	Hot Shots! Part Deux	sword maker
1991	Hook	sword maker – uncredited
