= John Nelson Cooper =

American custom knifemaker (1906–1987)

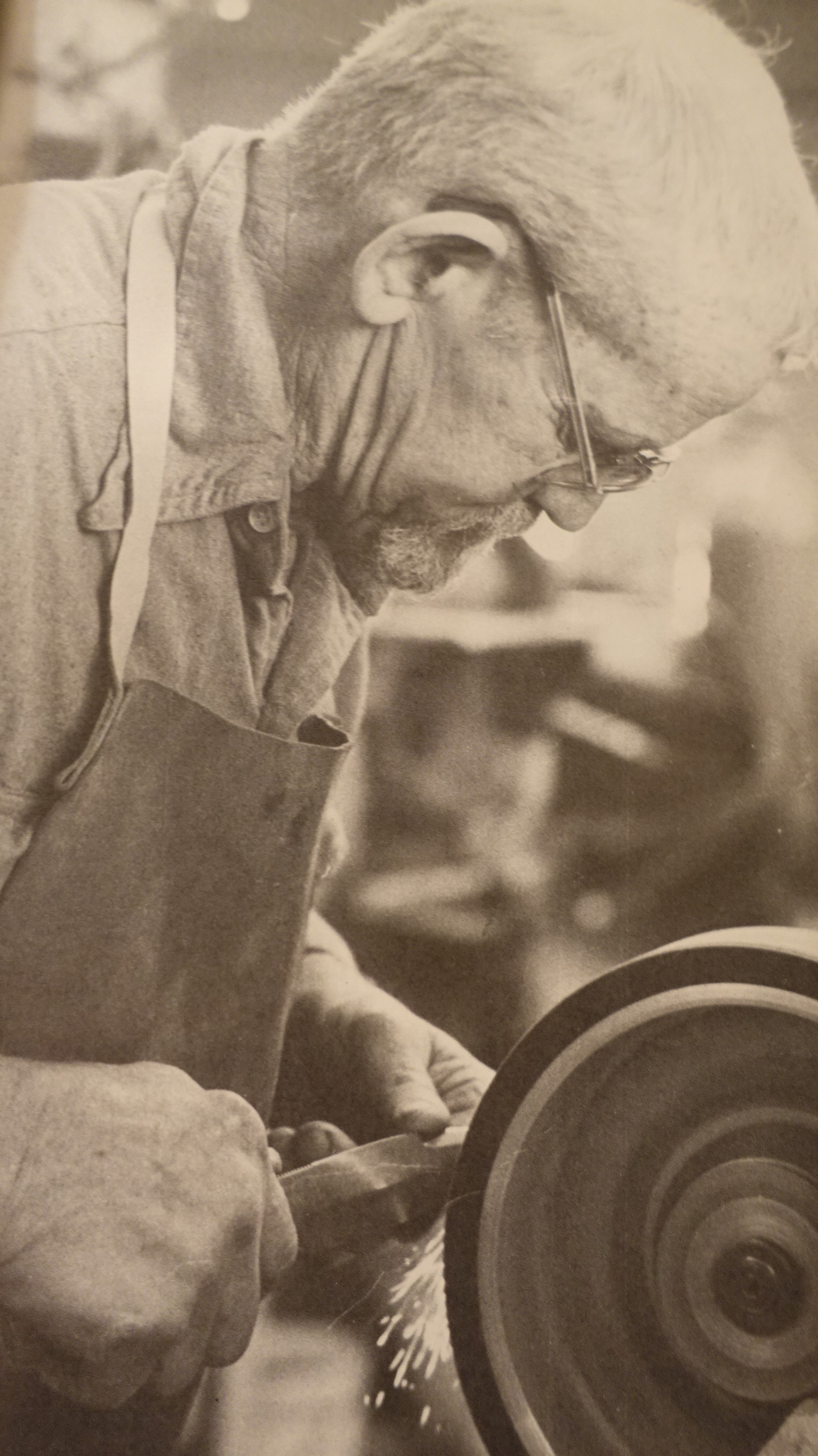
- Born: November 1, 1906; Tremont, Pennsylvania, United States
- Died: September 24, 1987 (aged 80); Lufkin, Texas, United States
- Occupation: Knifemaker

John Nelson Cooper (1906–1987) was an American custom knifemaker who was a founding member of the Knifemakers' Guild. He was a mentor to Jody Samson and made knives for over 60 years.

== History ==
Cooper began making utility knives and butcher knives in Tremont, Pennsylvania, in 1924 while working as a welder. Eventually he moved on to welding in the Virginia shipyards and began making hunting knives, fishing knives and combat knives as a second business. Cooper's knives were made by the stock removal method and he attached his handles using traditional methods such as rivets and pins until 1965 when he retired from welding and relocated to Burbank, California, as a full-time knifemaker with his nephew, Greorge Cooper as Cooper Knives.

As a full-time knifemaker, he noticed that his traditional methods of knife making could leave gaps between blade, guard, and handle material where water or blood could collect and eventually corrode the knife. He developed a new method of construction which made the knife and handle into a solid, bonded unit by welding, brazing, and using epoxy. He patented these ideas in 1967 (3481038) and 1971 (3595104).

A prolific maker who made over 100 knives in a month, Cooper taught his trade to knifemakers, Jody Samson and Vic Anselmo in 1969. He was a charter member of the Knifemakers' Guild. Cooper made push daggers for police officers and FBI agents.

Celebrities such as John Wayne, Sammy Davis Jr. and Lee Marvin collected Cooper's knives. Cooper made knives used in film and television such as the Arkansas toothpick in The Sacketts and a Bowie knife for Jeremiah Johnson.

In 1978, Cooper opened a new knife shop in Lufkin, Texas, where he made 1,000 knives per year until his retirement from knifemaking in 1981. In retirement he made a few knives every year until his death in 1987.
