= Jody Samson =

American bladesmith (1946-2008)

- Born: November 4, 1946; Burbank, California, United States
- Died: December 27, 2008 (aged 62); New Glarus, Wisconsin
- Occupation(s): Knifemaker, bladesmith

Jody Samson (November 4, 1946 – December 27, 2008) was a knifemaker and bladesmith from Burbank, California, who designed butterfly knives for Benchmade and the swords used in movies, including Conan the Barbarian, Conan the Destroyer, First Knight, The Mask of Zorro, Blade, Blind Fury, Batman & Robin, Batman Forever, and Streets of Fire.

== Early life ==
Samson learned knife making and bladesmithing from John Nelson Cooper, a veteran knife maker located in Burbank, California, in 1969. Samson began making knives full-time in 1974. Soon after, he was hired by Les DeAsis of Pacific Cutlery (now Benchmade) as a knife designer. Les deAsis credits Samson with grinding every custom balisong knife produced by Benchmade, Pacific Cutlery, and Bali-Song from 1979 to 1994. Samson's first design won Blade magazine's Knife of the Year award in 1979. The following year, Samson unveiled his "Wee-hawk" blade profile which was made by Benchmade for years.

== Movie swords ==
Samson designed and built the swords, knives, and daggers used in a number of films including Conan the Barbarian, Conan the Destroyer, Blind Fury, and Streets of Fire while he was working for Benchmade.

Samson left Benchmade in 1994 to return to Burbank to produce movie swords and props for Tony Swatton's Sword & Stone in Los Angeles, California. He designed and built the weapons for the films First Knight, The Mask of Zorro, Blade, Batman & Robin, Babylon 5, and Batman Forever.

In 2001 Samson went to work for Albion Swords in New Glarus, Wisconsin, where he made replicas of the swords he originally made for the Conan films.

== Later years and death ==
Samson was found dead of pneumonia in his workshop on December 27, 2008, after complaining of cold symptoms for a week.
