= Codex Belli =

Set of rules for medieval combat reenactment

Codex Belli is the name of a set of rules for medieval combat reenactment first issued in 1999 and then revised by the German umbrella group Kämpferliste in 2002.

The Codex Belli, literally Laws of Battle, are a ruleset for unchoreographed semi-contact combat with medieval reenactment weapons, which differ most notably from realistic replicas in that they have rounded edges and points. The goal of this ruleset was to create a common standard for safe fighting practices as lower-scale reenactment events grew larger and a trust-based system became insufficient with the increasing number of reenactors involved.

Numerous German medieval reenactment groups have adopted the Codex Belli as a standard ruleset for combat reenactment, in preference to custom rules based on other groups, such as the SCA. Among other things, its application at major national reenactment events has led to an increasing popularity, although critics have attempted to establish different systems.

== Hit Point Rules ==
Although the Codex Belli itself doesn't specify any rules for counting hits, two variants have become widely accepted at German events. These variants differ only in how many hit points an unarmoured combatant (e.g. someone wearing a gambeson, padded vest, or no armour at all) starts out with.

Some groups prefer setting that default to a single hit point, which leads to shorter battles and strongly favours chainmail, which grants the wearer one additional hit point, or plate armour, which grants the wearer two or more hit points, usually depending on whether it is a half-plate or full plate.

The other common variant is giving unarmoured combatants three hit points, which lowers the advantage of heavy armour, especially in longer battles where armoured combatants often tire out faster than unarmoured ones because of the added weight of metal armour.

Generally any hit counts as a single hit and deducts one of the victim's "lives" or "hit points", usually resulting in death in case of the single-hit variant. Some variations count hits with a projectile, such as an arrow or crossbow bolt, twice because the added range gives the victim more time to react than when having to deal with a melee attacker.

Sometimes, especially in training battles, trainees with little prior experience or who haven't been in a many-against-many combat before are granted an additional hit point. Combinations of these rules rarely result in a total number of hit-points greater than six using the triple-hit rule or four using the single-hit rule.

== Critique ==
Since some interpretations of the Codex Belli go as far as banning hits against the entire length of the lower arms and lower legs, shields have become the standard choice for a secondary weapon in these combats because they can cover the entire legal hit area (torso, upper arms and upper legs).

As a result, the unusual practice of attempting to hit the opponent on the back while facing him from the front has become increasingly popular because it seems to be the easiest way to score a hit when both combatants are using a sword and shield combination.

This is not only a very artificial technique, it is also criticised for provoking injuries in the upper body area or, especially in the absence of a solid helmet, on the head — both of which the Codex Belli was supposed to protect — by being based on the idea of the attacker trying to strike downwards from above the opponent's shoulder, which requires an upward movement of the sword.

== See also ==
- Historical reenactment
