= Warrior knife =

Fighting weapon

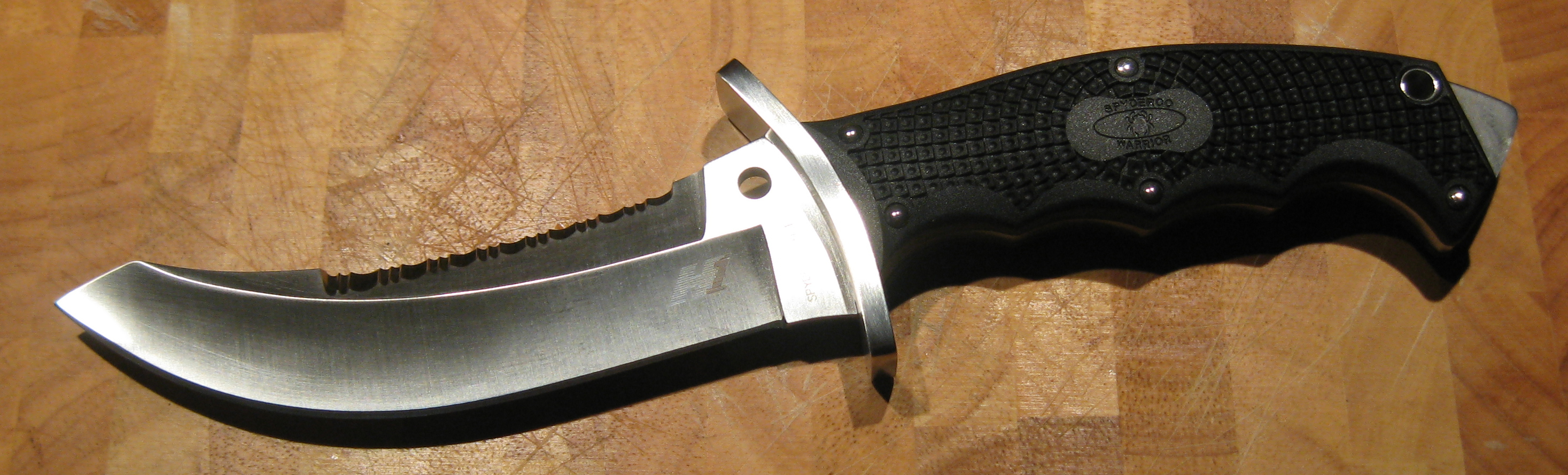
Spyderco Warrior

The Warrior knife is a large curved blade fighting knife with a serrated back edge that was first made by Al Mar Knives and Round Eye Knife and Tool (REKAT). Part of the knife's design is credited to martial arts instructor Michael Echanis.

== Design ==
The Warrior knife was designed by custom knife maker, Vietnam combat veteran, and close combat instructor Bob Taylor and Hwarang-do expert Randy Wanner. The blade is distinctive in that the entire rear portion of the blade has a serrated edge, that was added at the suggestion of Wanner's Hwarang-do student Michael D. Echanis and is the reason why the knife has the informal name "Echanis' Warrior". Al Mar was an edged-weapons specialist in the U.S. Army Special Forces, a 5th degree black belt in Judo when he started Al Mar Knives in 1978 and began work on the famous and highly sought after "Warrior" knife. In his book, Battle Blades, Greg Walker[3] refers to the Al Mar Warrior as, "perhaps the ultimate in battle-blade design.

In addition to the rear serrations used for trapping an opponent's attacking limb, the knife is noted for having an extremely ergonomic handle for use in both the forward and reverse grip. The handle was designed by making a complex study of the human hand through a COBOL computer program and this design has gone on to influence other fighting knives such as Emerson Knives' CQC-8 model.

== Versions ==
The original version was made by Al Mar Knives and had either a polished or blackened blade with either a black or camouflage rubber handle. G.Sakai of Seki Japan was the manufacturer of the Al Mar Warrior as well as Spyderco's version.

Round Eye Knife and Tool made a smaller version known as the "Hobbit Warrior" and a folding version known as the "Pocket Hobbit".

Spyderco knives makes a version of this knife.
