= Michael Echanis =

American soldier (1950–1978)

- Born: 16 November 1950; Nampa, Idaho
- Died: 8 September 1978 (aged 27); Rivas Department, Nicaragua
- Years active: 1969–78

Other information
- Occupation: Martial arts instructor, author

Michael Dick Echanis (November 16, 1950 – September 8, 1978) was an American enlisted soldier and self-styled "soldier of fortune". In 1970, he served briefly in "C" Company, 75th Ranger Regiment Infantry in Vietnam. Echanis then made his living as a martial artist, writer and editor. He was the martial arts editor for the magazine Soldier of Fortune (SOF) from 1974 to 1976. He died while working as a private security contractor in Nicaragua at the behest of the Nicaraguan National Guard. This was reported by SOF in an article published after the incident.

== Biography ==
=== Early life ===
Echanis was born in Nampa, Idaho. He enlisted in the US Army in 1969 upon graduation from Ontario High School. Echanis had long been interested in the military and came from a family where his father, Frank, and his uncles had all served during World War II. In published articles, Echanis indicated that many of his skills at stealth and concealment were inspired by his reading about American Indians and trying out these techniques when hiding from local police.

=== Military service ===
Echanis attended basic training at Fort Ord, California, and went on to airborne training at Fort Benning, Georgia. In 1970 he volunteered for duty in Vietnam where he served with Company C (Rgr), 75th Infantry, FFV/USARPAC as a scout-observer.

Echanis received the Combat Infantryman Badge (CIB), Purple Heart and Bronze Star with "V" device for actions during a company size NVA ambush in which he is credited with saving the lives of six of his comrades. He was also awarded the Vietnamese Cross of Gallantry. Although severely wounded in his foot and ankle, Echanis was the only soldier capable of fighting back until help arrived in the form of U.S. helicopters. The closing paragraph of the Army's award narrative states:

Spec 4 Echanis' aggressive spirit and undaunted courage were decisive in preventing the anhilation [sic] of the truck and its personnel. His actions, at the risk of his own life, were in the highest traditions of the military and reflect upon himself, his unit, and the United States Army.

This incident is Echanis' only documented action during his Vietnam service. His service in the Army was a total of 15 months of which 2 months were served in Vietnam. He was evacuated to the military hospital in San Francisco where he made his recovery over seven months.

Echanis' military record shows that during his short military career he did not attend or graduate from Ranger School and that although he participated in Phase One of the Special Forces Qualification Course he did not, for administrative reasons, progress further.

=== Martial arts ===
After his medical discharge in December 1970, Echanis returned to Ontario, Oregon. He renewed his study of Judo and trained in Karate with now Ninjitsu Sensei Toshiro Nagato who had become a childhood friend According to a family member Echanis trained for a short time as a boxer during this period. This was under Al Berro, who lived and trained fighters in Boise, Idaho. Echanis fought several times as a boxer in the heavyweight class but left boxing to continue his study of the Eastern martial arts.

Echanis developed a two-week hand-to-hand Instructor combat course sponsored by the United States Army John F. Kennedy Center for Military Assistance (USAJFKCENMA) at Fort Bragg, North Carolina. The program was authorized in December 1975 and Echanis was formally appointed the "Senior Instructor and Advisor to the USAJFKCENMA Hand to Hand Combat/Special Weapons School for Instructors" in a Memorandum For Record signed by Major Jerry C. Williams, then Chief, PSD, at the JFK Center. Six courses were presented in 1976. Echanis' combatives program was titled the "Hwarangdo Hand to Hand and Special Weapons Program".

The USAJFKCENMA, then commanded by Major General Robert C. Kingston, issued formal Certificates of Participation in the "Hwarang Do/Hand to Hand Combat School" to include the Instructor Course the participant attended. Both MG Kingston and Colonel Timothy G Cannon, Chief of Staff, signed the certificates. Joo Bang Lee, founder and then leader of the World Hwa Rang Do Association affixed his personal seal to each certificate which conferred Black Belt ranking on the participant.

Echanis then moved on to Little Creek, Virginia and A.P. Hill where, courtesy of Richard Marcinko, then the commanding officer of SEAL Team 2, he taught three 2-week H2H courses for the SEALs. These courses, titled "SEAL TEAM TWO Hwarang Do Hand to Hand Combat/Special Weapons and Special Tactics School for Instructors" were attested to in a memorandum signed by LT Commander Bruce Van Heertum, United States Navy. Van Heertum took over command of SEAL Team TWO upon Marcinko moving to his next assignment in Washington DC. Van Heertum designated Echanis as being appointed "...the permanent senior advisor and head instructor for the SEAL Team TWO Hand to Hand Combat/Special Weapons/Tactics School for Instructors."

=== Death ===
On September 8, 1978, at 13:00, Echanis, fellow American mercenary Chuck Sanders, South Vietnamese mercenary Nguyen "Bobby" van Nguyen, and General Alegrett died in an aircraft accident at the mouth of the Sapoá River near the Nicaragua/Costa Rican border.

== Books ==
Echanis' name is listed as the author of three books about hand-to-hand combat:

- Knife Self-Defense for Combat, Ohara Press, (1977) ISBN 978-0-89750-022-7. OCLC 631144529
- Basic Stick Fighting for Combat, Ohara Press, (1979) ISBN 978-0-89750-059-3. OCLC 256219679
- Knife Fighting, Knife Throwing for Combat, Ohara Press, (1979) ISBN 978-0-89750-058-6. OCLC 5147533

Much of the text material is verbatim duplicated in Hwarang-do founder Joo Bang Lee's book Hwarangdo also published by Ohara Press, supporting the claim that Echanis was a public front man for the Lee brothers in their attempt to promote Hwarang-do as the official US Special forces close-quarters fighting method.

== Criticism ==
Echanis was historically a free style fighter and after his wounding and recovery he traveled around the US challenging and successfully fighting a number of black belt ranked studio owners/operators. Echanis served as the martial arts editor of Soldier of Fortune magazine from 1974 to 1976. Echanis was vetted by now deceased San Francisco martial arts instructor Art Gitlin. This was at the request of SOF publisher and editor Robert K. Brown, well before the 1978 printing of the SOF-paid-for book series ("Si Gung Art Gitlin – Haak Lung Chuan", by Michael DeAlba, Fighting Knives Magazine, January 1996, p. 71). According to Gitlin he was to "smoke out" whether Echanis was just one of many "ninjas" then petitioning SOF in the hopes of publicity or self promotion.

== Legacy ==
=== In popular culture ===
- The fictional character of "Staff Sgt Ben Echmeyer" (portrayed by actor Morse Bicknell) in the film version of The Men Who Stare at Goats (2009) is based on Echanis.
- In Knights of the Old Republic 2, Brianna the Handmaiden, a companion for the male player character, is a member of the "Echani" race who were once rivals to the war-like Mandalorians.

=== Warrior knife ===
Echanis contributed to the design of the Warrior knife. In an article published in SOF written after Echanis' death by Randy Wanner, the author, playing the role of the attacker, is seen using one of the prototype Warriors he had made for himself. Wanner refers to the knife he uses in this article as the "Echanis warrior knife". However it was the Gerber Mark II and the shorter Mark I fighting knives that became Echanis' most recognized personal weapon and signature trademark.

=== Accolades ===
- President Jimmy Carter sent the Echanis Family a Presidential Certificate honoring their son's service to the country several months after his death.
- On October 8, 2013, Echanis was designated as Black Belt magazine's 2013 Weapons Instructor of the Year.
