= Spyderco =

Knife and sharpening company

Spyderco Knives, Inc.
- Type: Proprietorship
- Industry: Manufacturing
- Founded: Golden, Colorado; 1978; 48 years ago
- Headquarters: Golden, Colorado
- Key people: Sal Glesser, Founder & President
- Products: Knives
- Revenue: US$10 million
- Number of employees: ~100
- Website: spyderco.com

Spyderco is an American cutlery company based in Golden, Colorado, producing knives and knife sharpeners. Spyderco pioneered many features that are now common in folding knives, including the pocket clip, serrations, and the opening hole. Spyderco has collaborated with over 30 custom knife makers, athletes, and self-defence instructors for designs and innovated the usage of 20 different blade materials.

== History ==
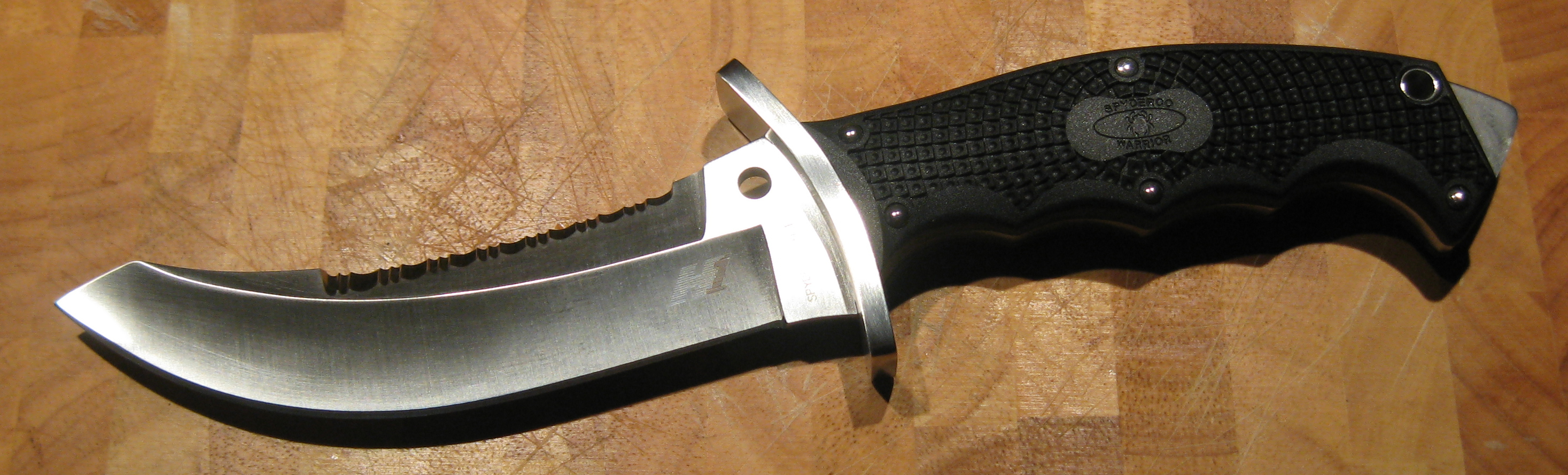
Spyderco Warrior knife

Spyderco was founded by Sal Glesser. The name Spyderco was coined after Glesser noticed that many high-performance sports cars had 'Spyder' in the name, which inspired the name Spyderco to signify high performance cutting tools. The first product Spyderco produced was the Portable Hand in 1976, this "spider-shaped device", was a series of angles, ball joints and alligator clips that helped people such as jewelers and hobbyists to work with small parts. Spyderco's founder, Sal Glesser, and his wife Gail, converted an old bread delivery truck into a motorhome and traveled to shows. As they became more successful, they graduated from the bread truck to a truck and trailer. They settled in Golden in November 1978. The firm began producing knife sharpeners in 1978 and produced their first folding knife, the C01 Worker, in 1981; this was the first to feature a round hole in the blade designed for fast, one-handed and ambidextrous opening, which is now the company's trademark. Additionally, the company claims that this was the first knife to feature a pocket clip on the right side of the handle.

== Products ==
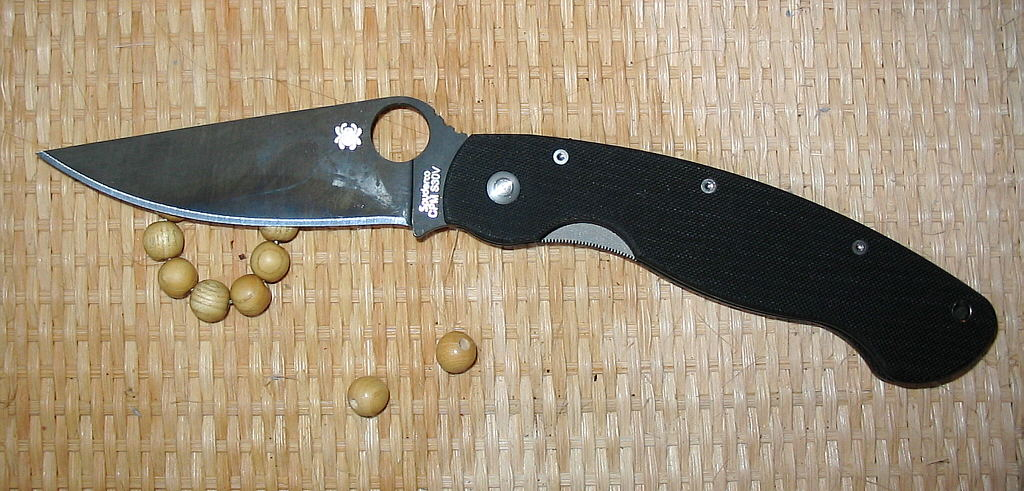
Spyderco Military

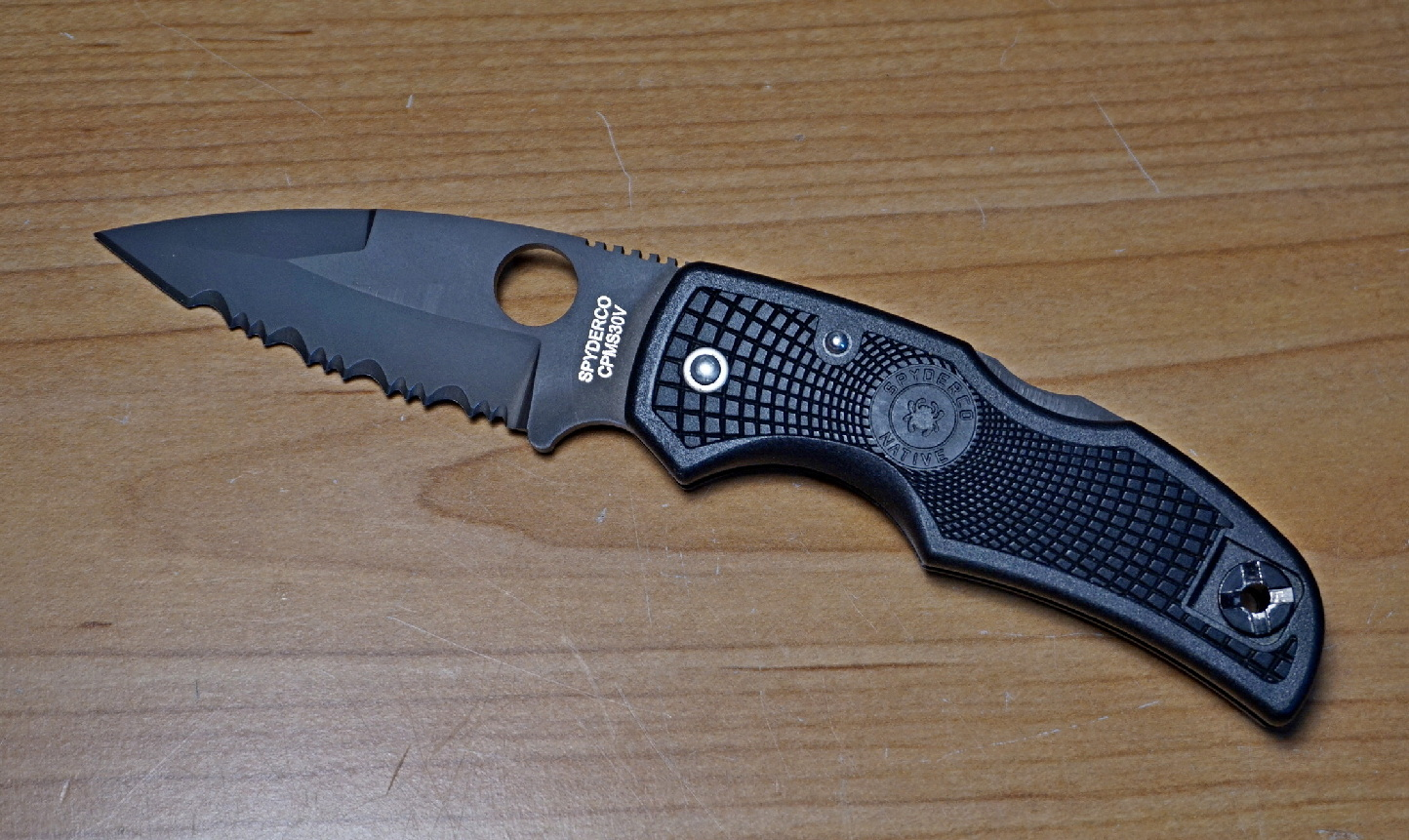
Spyderco Native 3

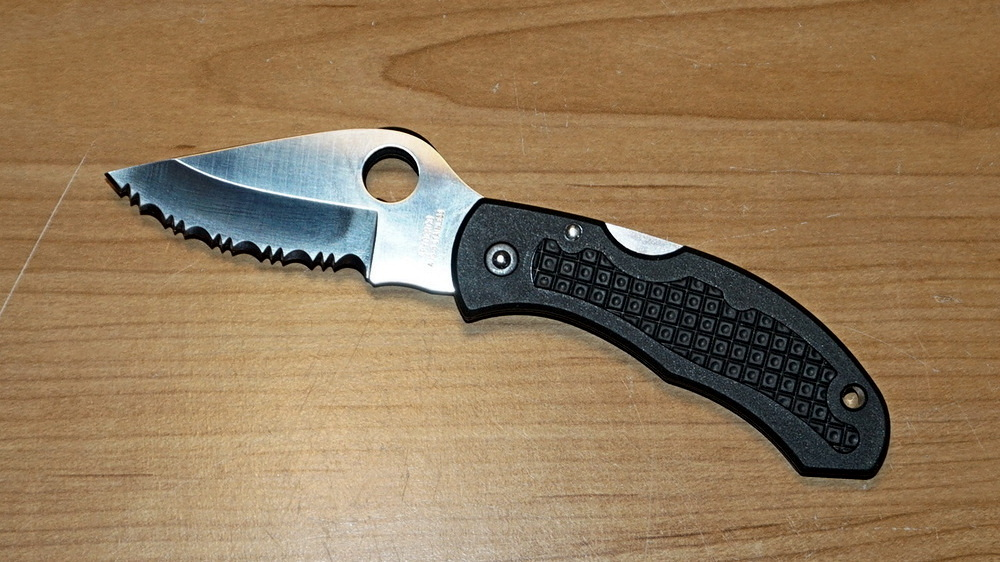
Spyderco Snap-it

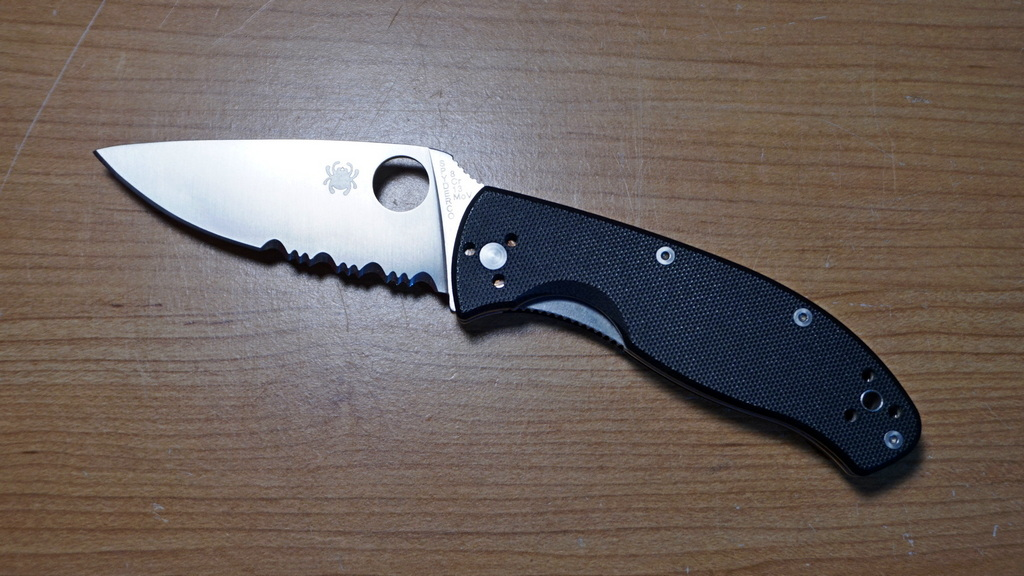
Spyderco Tenacious G10

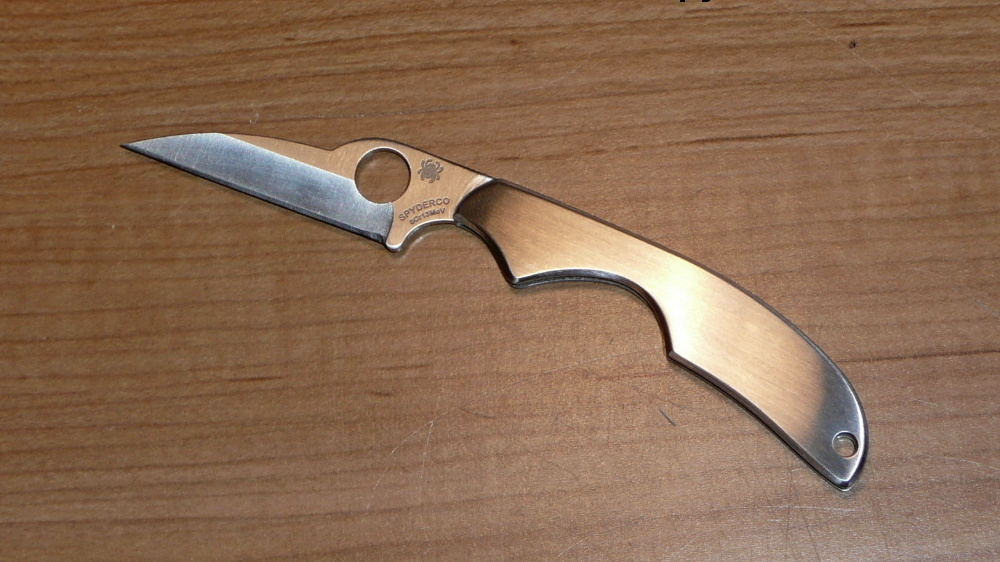
Spyderco Kiwi 3 SS

Most knives produced by Spyderco are folding knives of various designs, blade steels, handle materials, and locking mechanisms (including two patented proprietary locks); however, they have also produced fixed-blade knives for various purposes.

The firm's knives are made with a plain edge, a partially serrated edge, or a fully serrated "Spyder Edge" configuration. Their most common handle material is FRN (Fiberglass Reinforced Nylon) and G10, although they make knives with steel handles as well as some limited editions with handles from various other materials.

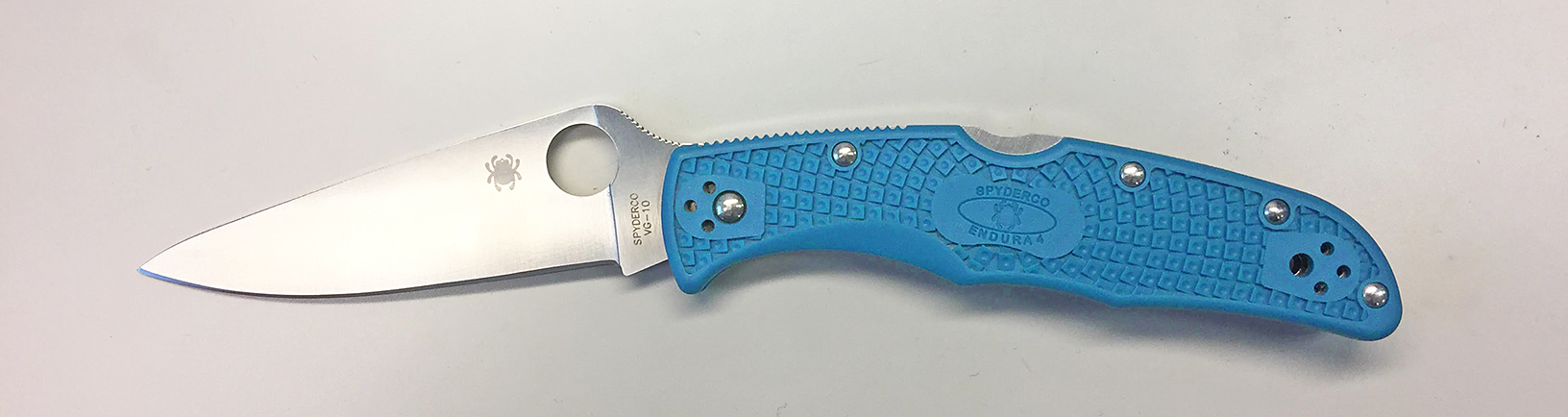
Spyderco Endura 4, which is made in Japan

A large part of the firm's knife production is outsourced to foreign contractors in countries such as Japan, Taiwan, Italy, and China, though many of their flagship knives are made in the US. Knives made with CPM S30V steel were previously all made in Golden, Colorado; however, Spyderco began shipping CPM-S30V to Taiwan to have their highest end knives produced there using this steel.

Spyderco knives are popular with many markets including private citizens, fire and rescue personnel and law enforcement officers.

For his many influences in tactical knife design (most notably the pocket clip, serrations, and opening hole) and many collaborations with custom knife makers, Spyderco's President, Sal Glesser, was inducted into the Blade magazine Cutlery Hall of Fame at the 2000 Blade Show in Atlanta, Georgia.

== Blade steels ==
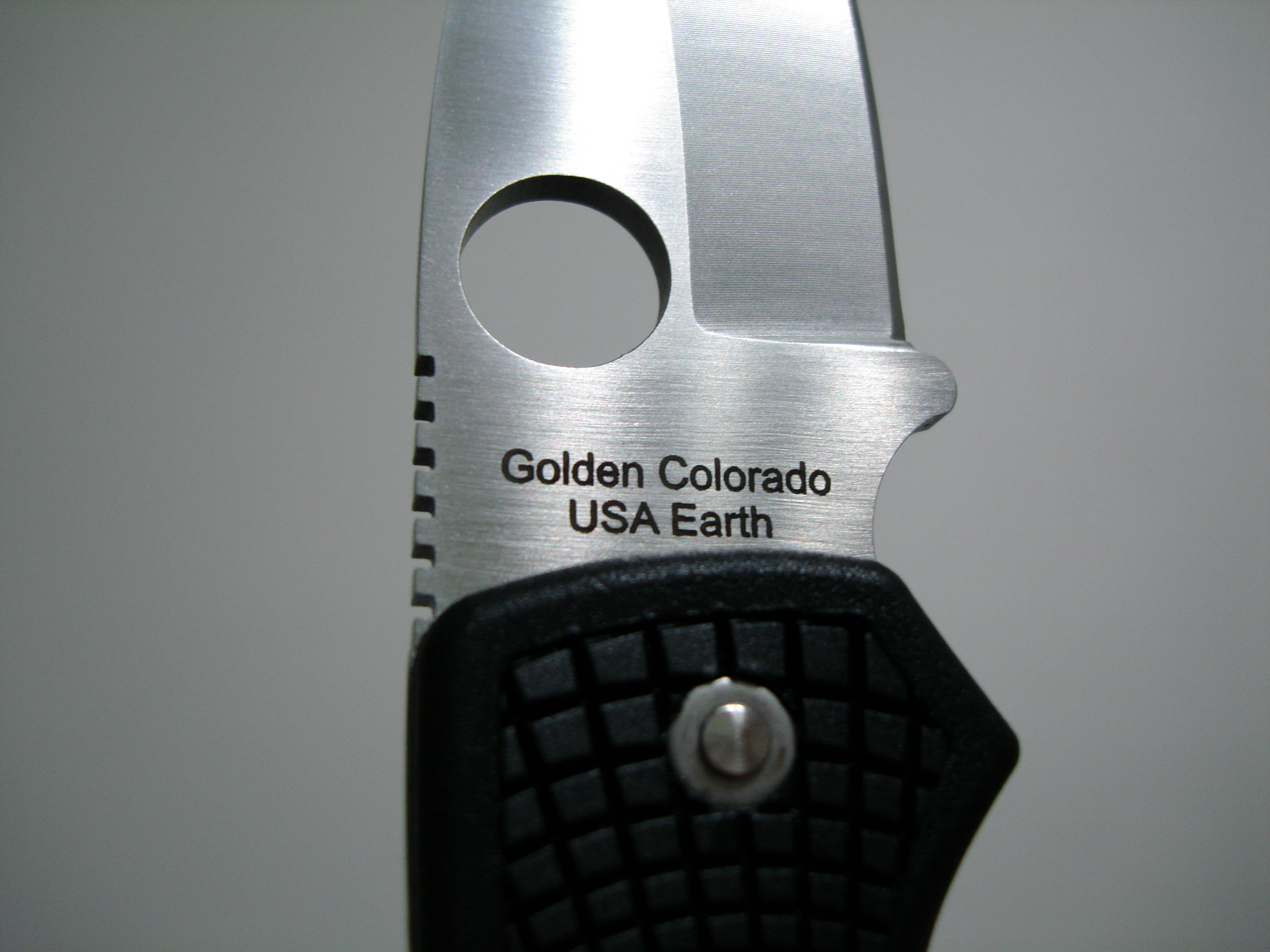
Spyderco Native

Spyderco has experimented with the most new blade steels compared to other brands over the years, including "exotic" steels such as CPM-Rex-121 and CPM-15V. In 1994, it was the first company to use powder metallurgy in a production knife (in the form of Crucible's S60V tool steel), and the first knife company to use H-1 steel in a folding knife. The Mule Team Project offers end users fixed-blade knife in various steels for the performance testing.

Spyderco's current Steel Chart PDF.

The blade steels used by the company over the years include:

154CM an American stainless cutlery steel

52100, a ball bearing steel used in the first run of the Mule project.

8Cr13MoV, a Chinese stainless steel tempered at the 56 to 58 HRC range and used in the Tenacious, Persistence, Ambitious, Resilience, Grasshopper, Kiwi3 and Byrd lines of knives. Often compared to AUS-8, but with slightly more carbon.

9Cr18MoV, a Chinese stainless steel used mostly in high-end barbering scissors and surgical tools.

440C, a stainless steel known for corrosion resistance and ease of sharpening.

Aogami Super Blue (青紙スーパー), a Japanese high-end steel made by Hitachi. The "Blue" refers not to the color of the steel itself, but the color of the paper in which the raw steel comes wrapped.

ATS-55, a performance stainless steel similar to ATS-34 with the molybdenum reduced, used only by Spyderco for knife steels until the early 2000s.

AUS-6, similar in quality to 440a, used as a "budget" steel in early Spyderco models.

AUS-8, a frequently used Japanese steel, which is known for taking a very fine edge, due to the inclusion of vanadium. Sharpens easily, and has moderate edge holding and corrosion resistance.

AUS-10, a Japanese stainless steel series made by Aichi with the same carbon content as 440C but with slightly less chromium.

BG-42, a high performance high speed stainless steel formulated by Latrobe for ball bearings, similar to ATS-34 (same composition, but with added vanadium), which has similar properties.

CPM S30V steel an American powder-metallurgy, high-carbide steel developed for the cutlery market.

CPM-M4 (a.k.a AISI M4), usually tempered to 62-65 HRC, a high-speed steel with combination of high carbon, molybdenum, vanadium, and tungsten for excellent wear resistance and toughness; a powder-metallurgical, non-stainless steel.

CPM-S60V, (a.k.a. 440V, a.k.a. CPM440V), a modern American super-steel that is wear resistant, but difficult to sharpen. The low level of toughness means that it can only be hardened to around 56 RC, causing the edge-holding performance to be diminished.

CPM-S90V (a.k.a. 420V), similar to Crucible's S60V but designed to be more wear resistant with a very high carbide volume and high vanadium content. Appreciated for extreme edge-holding. S90V was featured in a sprint run of Spyderco's Military in 2004. Since then it has been used in several sprint runs in knives like the Manix 2 and Paramilitary 2. While S90V holds an edge better than S30V, both are usually hardened to about 59–61 RC.

CTS-20CP, Carpenter Technology's version of S90V, with slightly reduced chromium. Features high wear-resistance and edge-holding, hardened to about 60 RC.

CTS-BD1, Carpenter's versions of Gin-1 with improved chemistry. Originally featured in a Mule Team fixed blade.

CTS-XHP, made by Carpenter Technology. Often referred to as a stainless version of D2 however, testing shows higher toughness and edge retention to that of D2.

D2, a high performance tool steel that features high wear resistance. Spyderco uses Crucible's version of D2, which is a powder metallurgy version. CPM-D2 is found in a sprint run version of the Military model.

G2, a.k.a. GIN-1 (銀紙1号), a Hitachi-made low cost stainless steel comparable to, but softer than, AUS-8. Generally hardened in the mid to high RC 50s. A tough, corrosion-resistant steel.

H-1, a steel which is well suited for marine applications, because it substitutes nitrogen for carbon and thus is completely rust-proof in any normal environment such as saltwater exposure, though can still oxidize if exposed to extreme heat and chemical attack. It grinds, scratches and has edge retention similar to the low carbide steels such as AUS-6. It is a precipitation hardening steel, which means it hardens by the mechanical process of grinding the steel, rather than by heat treating.

MBS-26, a Japanese [stainless] steel, very fine grained with high corrosion resistance used in the Catcherman and in most kitchen knives by Spyderco.

N690CO, an Austrian stainless steel similar to VG-10. Currently found in the Squeak and previously used in Spydercos manufactured by Fox Cutlery.

VG-10 (V金10号), a Japanese steel developed for the horticulture industry by Takefu, often hardened around the RC60 range. Reported to have better corrosion resistance but less edge retention than S30V. Appreciated for taking a fine edge, and being easy to sharpen, while still holding an edge well. Used in most of the firm's Japanese-made knives.

ZDP-189, a Japanese powdered super-steel made by Hitachi, hardened to RC 62–67, with very high carbide volume. Has inferior edge-holding ability to S90V and S110V due to the softer nature of chromium carbides present in this steel.

== Collaborations ==
Through the years, Spyderco has collaborated with numerous custom knife makers in the design of various models.

=== List of collaborators ===
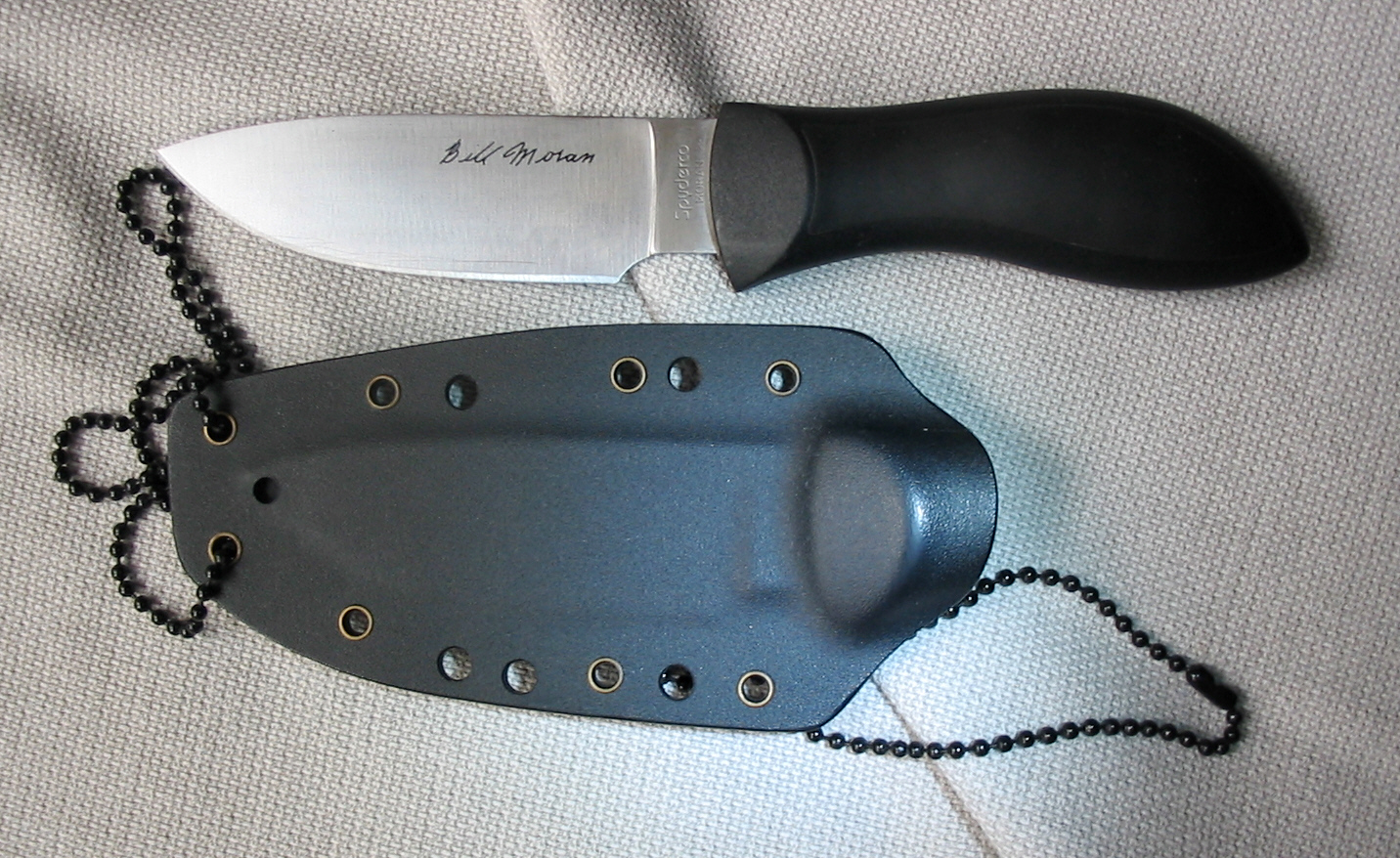
FB02 Spyderco Bill Moran Drop Point

- Jens Anso
- Massad Ayoob
- Eduard Bradichansky
- Gayle Bradley
- Jason Breeden
- Darriel Caston
- Peter Carrey
- Frank Centofante
- Chris Claycombe
- Alexandru Diaconescu
- Ernest Emerson
- Bram Frank
- Wayne Goddard
- Peter Herbst
- D'Alton Holder
- Jess Horn
- Michael Janich
- James A. Keating
- Brian Lai
- Szabo Laszlo
- Chad Los Banos
- Bob Lum
- R. J. Martin
- William F. Moran
- Ken Onion
- Philippe Perotti
- Fred Perrin
- Peter Rassenti
- Ed Schempp
- Ed Scott
- Jot Singh Khalsa
- Marcin Slysz
- JD Smith
- Mike Snody
- Brad Southard
- Laci Szabo
- Bob Terzuola
- Sacha Thiel
- Warren Thomas
- Ralph Turnbull
- Ulrich Hennicke Germany/Ulize C161GP
- Butch Vallotton
- Howard Viele
- Michael Walker
- Tim Wegner
- Tim Zowada
- Paul Alexander
- Kevin Smock

== Sprint runs ==
Spyderco often produces limited edition models, referred to as sprint runs. These limited runs are generally versions of discontinued models with different blade and handle materials, though some are completely new models, such as the Kopa; a "dress knife" with several variants, each with a different handle material such as micarta, evrina, and tiger coral.

== Byrd brand ==
A subdivision of Spyderco, Byrd's logo

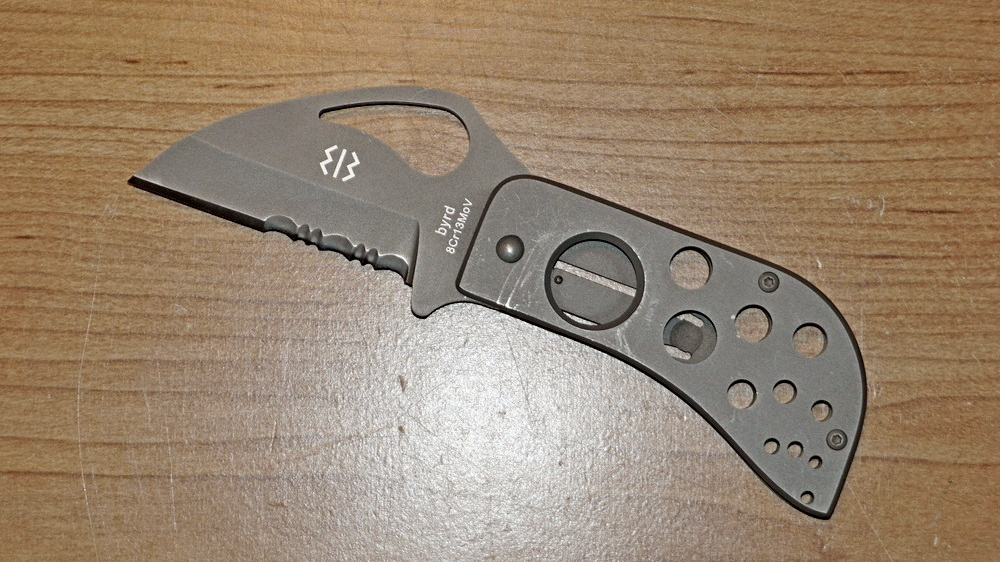
Byrd Flatbyrd

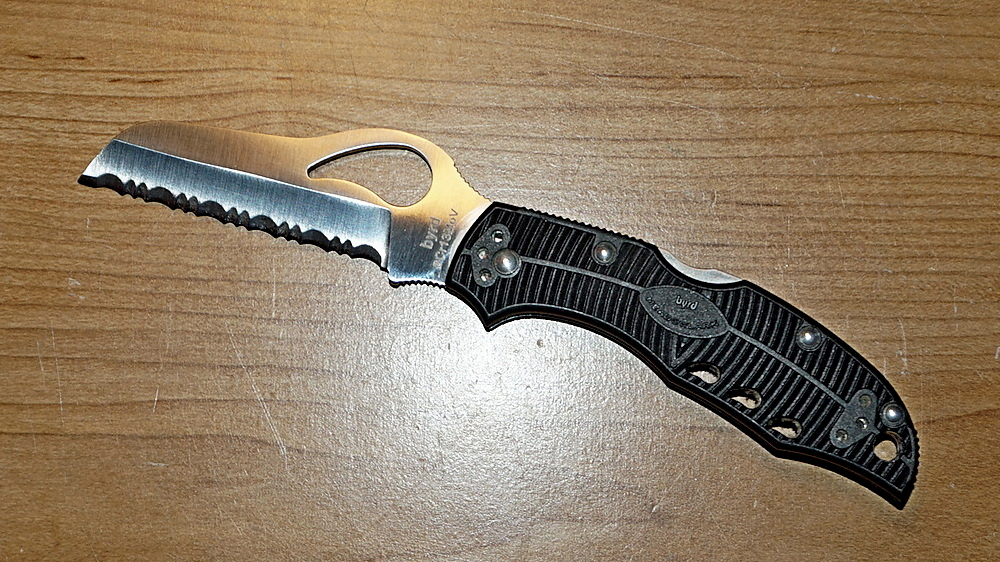
Byrd Meadowlark Rescue

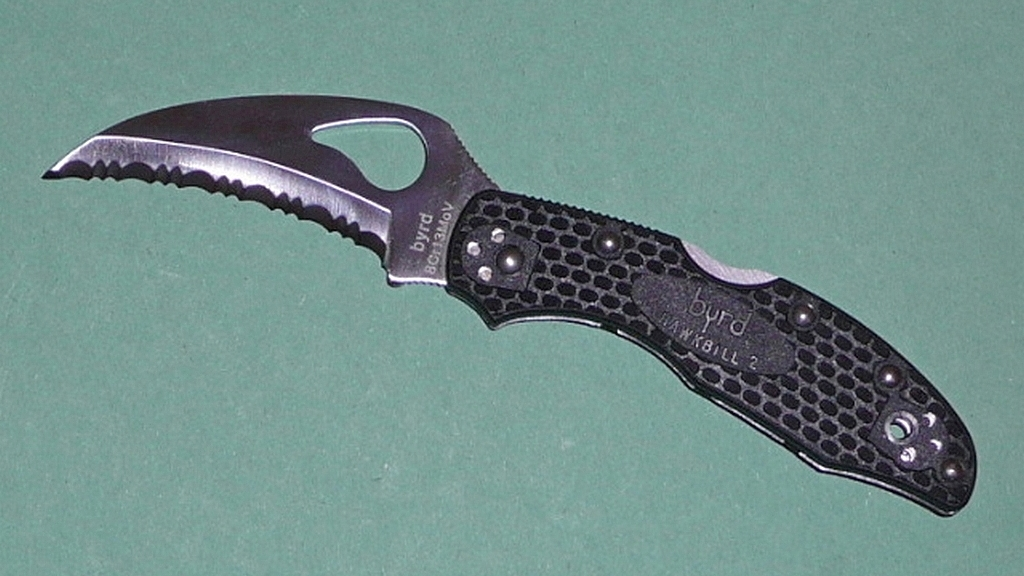
Byrd Hawkbill 2

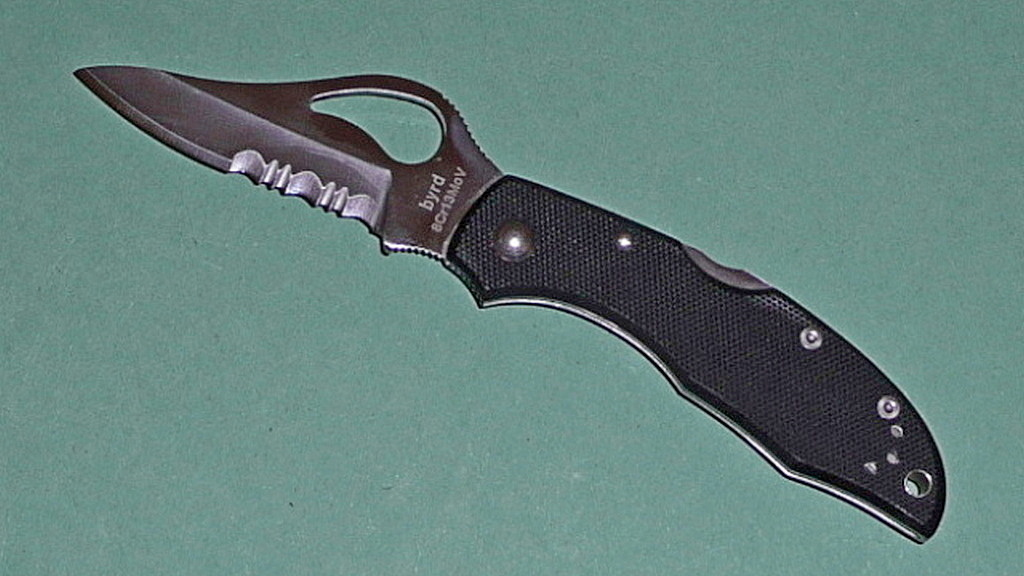
Byrd Meadowlark G10

Spyderco designs and produces knives under the Byrd brand. These knives use high quality materials and are manufactured in China, allowing much lower prices while retaining most of Spyderco's quality. To differentiate the brands, Byrd knives have a "comet" shaped opening hole in the blade, rather than the trademark round hole found on Spyderco models.

To date, Byrd knives have featured 8Cr13MoV as their blade steel except for the Byrd Catbyrd titanium which uses 9Cr18Mo steel. The brand's early knives were marked 440C, but tests found that the steel was something entirely different from American 440C. This steel was closer to AUS-8 than American 440C, and also went by the name 8Cr13MoV.

The first Byrd models, the Cara Cara, Meadowlark, Flight, Pelican, and Crossbill, initially featured stainless steel handles. Newer Byrds have featured aluminum, fiberglass reinforced nylon (FRN), and G10 handles.
