= Albion Swords =

Albion Swords (formerly Albion Armorers) is a company based in New Glarus, Wisconsin manufacturing European sword replicas. The company was started in Washington D.C. by Howard and Amy Waddell in 1998.

== Products ==
Albion has several different product lines that vary widely in price. Their most expensive "Museum Line" consists of swords that have been recreated from existing museum pieces. Their "Next Generation" line is the largest and most fully featured line. The lowest-end is the "Squire Line" and the "Maestro Line," which is a series of sparring swords intended for practitioners of historical European martial arts.

In 2001, Albion Swords hired Bladesmith and custom Knifemaker Jody Samson to reproduce collector versions of the swords he designed for the Conan the Barbarian films. Samson worked at Albion until his death in 2008.

== See also ==
- List of sword manufacturers
