= CPM S30V steel =

Type of steel alloy used for cutlery

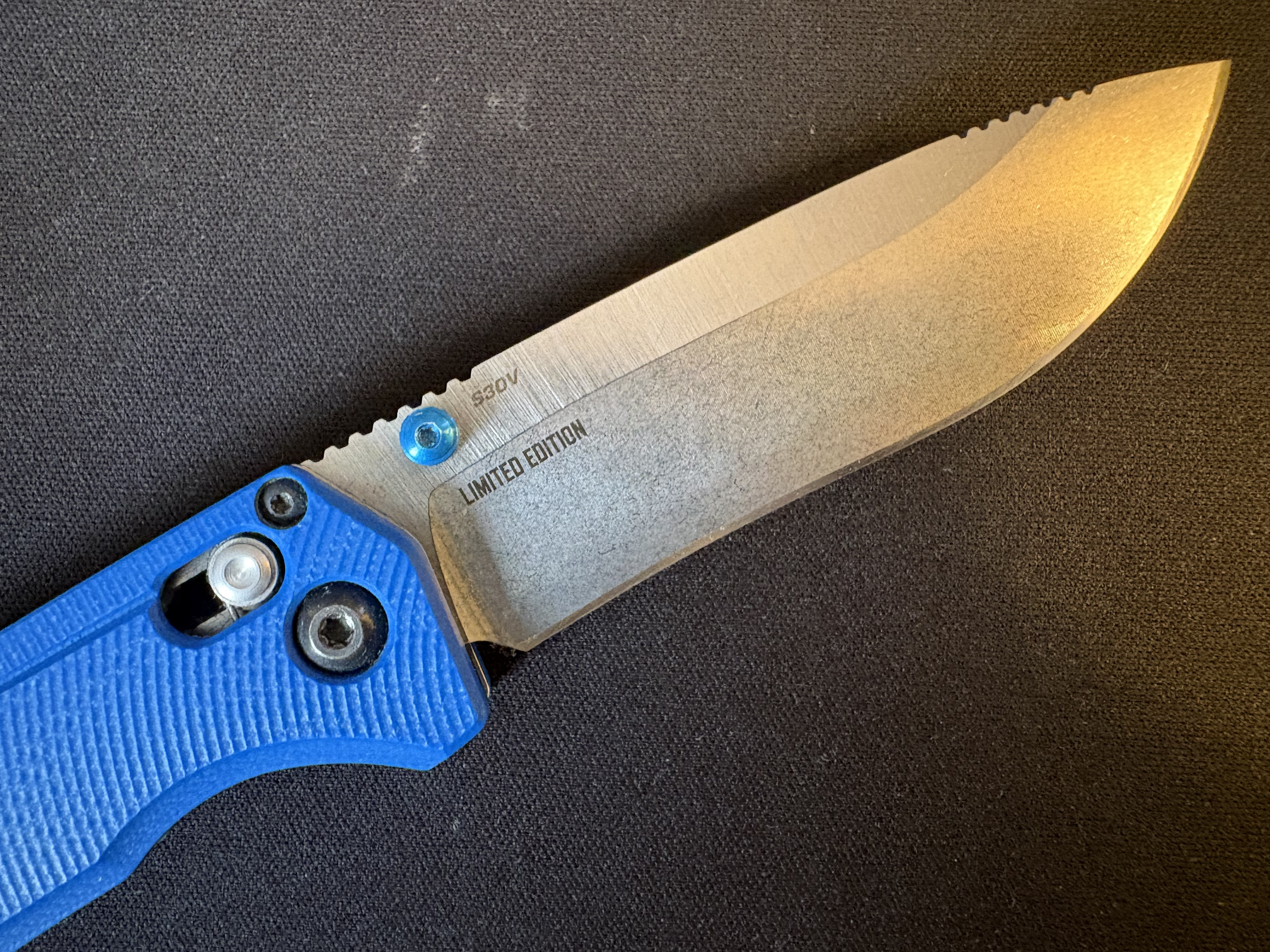
Benchmade folding knife with S30V steel

CPM S30V is a martensitic (hardened) powder-made (sintered) wear and corrosion-resistant stainless steel developed by Dick Barber of Crucible Industries in collaboration with knifemaker Chris Reeve. Its chemistry promotes the formation and even distribution of vanadium carbides, which are harder and more resistant to abrasion than chromium carbides. The powdered metallurgy process reduces the size of the carbides and gives the steel a very refined grain, further improving toughness. It contains carbon 1.45%, chromium 14.00%, vanadium 4.00%, and molybdenum 2.00%. Barber received feedback from a number of other knife users and knifemakers such as Sal Glesser, Ernest Emerson, Tony Marfione, Phil Wilson, William Harsey Jr., Tom Mayo, Jerry Hossom, and Paul Bos in the development of CPM S30V.

CPM S30V is considered a premium-grade knife steel. Buck Knives calls it "the absolute best blade steel available". Joe Talmadge claims it may be the ultimate high-end all-around stainless steel, for its high performance coupled with easier machinability than the other steels in this class.

== Properties ==
=== Composition ===
Carbon	Chromium	Vanadium	Molybdenum
1.45%	14%	4.00%	2.00%

=== Physical properties ===
Elastic modulus	Density
32 X 10^{6} psi	0.27 lbs./in3
(221 GPa)	(7.47 g/cm^{3})

Coefficient of thermal expansion

°F	°C	in/in/°F	mm/mm/°C
70-400	20-200	6.1^{−6}	11.0^{−6}
70-600	20-315	6.4^{−6}	11.5^{−6}

== CPM-S35VN ==
In 2009, Crucible Steel introduced an update to CPM-S30V to meet the needs of renowned knife maker Chris Reeve that they called CPM-S35VN. The addition of 0.5% Niobium, and reductions in both Carbon (from 1.45% to 1.40%) and Vanadium (from 4% to 3%) produced an alloy with 25% increase in measured Charpy V-notch toughness over S30V (Crucible claims 15-20% improvement). Working chefs and outdoor survivalists laud the improved toughness of S35VN, which greatly reduces the micro-bevel chipping that tends to plague S30V in rough use. In these kinds of applications the advantage of an S35VN blade over S30V is quick honing with a strop or steel stick in lieu of needing to remove metal and reform the edge. In light use, edge-holding and stainless properties between S35VN versus S30V are thought to be roughly the same, and performance will often be affected nearly as much by the applied heat treatment, blade design, and the edge geometry as the differences in metal chemistry.

Around this same time period, Carpenter CTS-XHP and Uddeholm Elmax became more widely available for cutlery usage. These powdered steels use a different process than Crucible, but they are also high-end stainless steels (with high-chromium and high-vanadium levels similar to S30V and S35VN) intended to compete with CPM-S30V and CPM-S35VN.

Carbon	Chromium	Vanadium	Molybdenum	Niobium
1.40%	20%	3.00%	2.00%	0.50%
