= Mike Snody =

Southern Texas knife maker (born 1964)

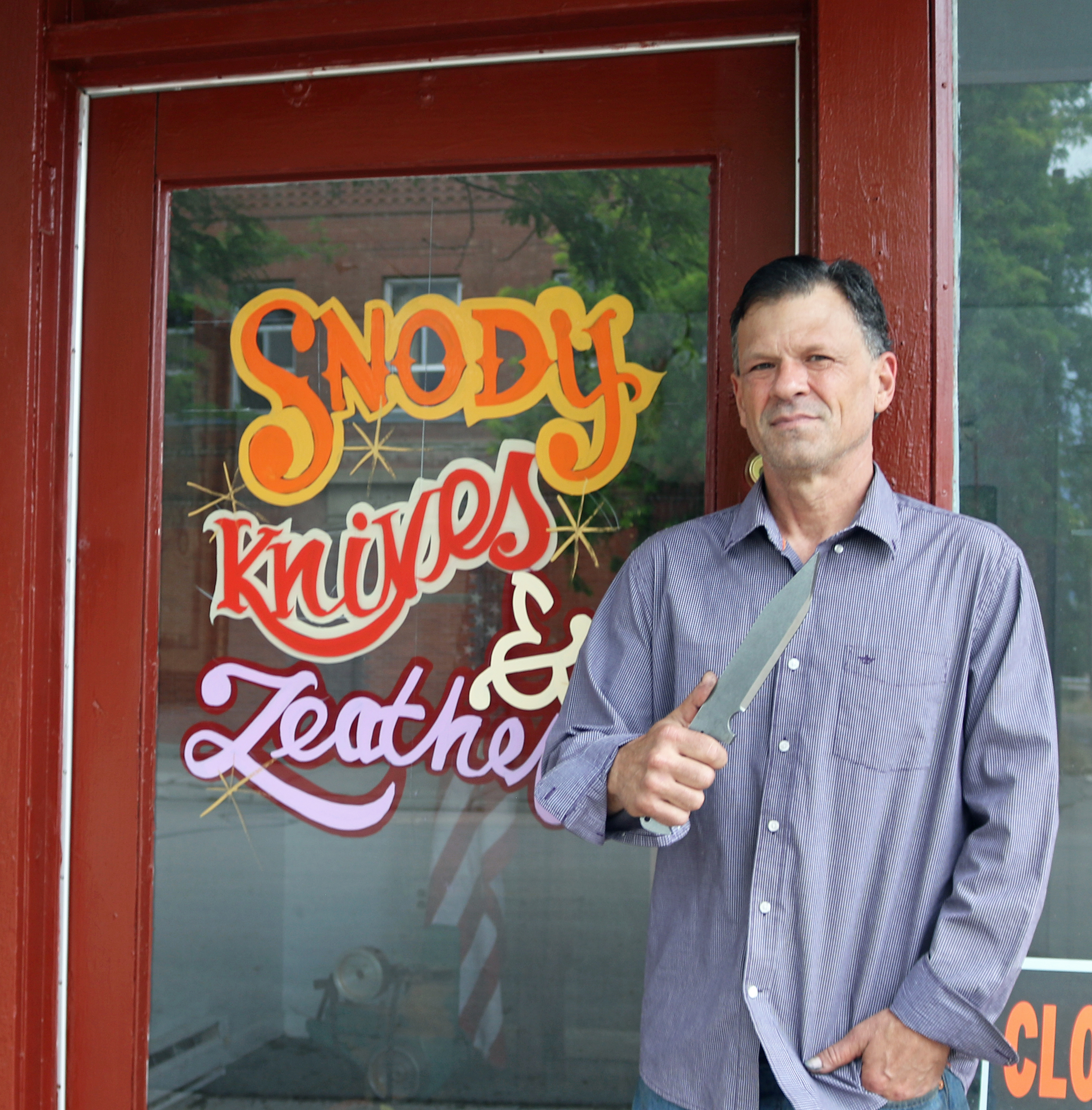
- Snody in 2019.
- Born: October 20, 1964 (age 61); Corpus Christi, Texas
- Occupations: Knifemaker, CEO
- Known for: tactical knives

Mike Snody is a Southern Texas knife maker who is known for his use of exotic materials in his custom knives. He is currently based in Walsenburg, Colorado.

== Knife Making ==
Snody worked as a Quality Control Inspector in the petroleum industry before making custom knives. He began making Japanese influenced fixed-blade knives in 1998 and branched out into other designs by 2004 including Kitchen knives, Machetes, Fixed blade fighting knives, and Pocket Knives. Most of his designs have a primary focus on self-defense or tactical applications. He has used a variety of steel types in his knife construction over the years. A2, s35v, 154 cm, 440c and Damascus are the most commonly used. There are many examples of Titanium used in his Folding Knives. Titanium blades often have a carbonized edge for added toughness, since titanium is work hardened and not heat treated. Each sheath is hand made out of leather or kydex. The handle construction of his knives are simply wrapped in parachute cord also known as paracord or be embellished with exotic materials such as petrified dinosaur bone, giraffe bone, and Hippopotamus tooth. Snody often uses Timascus in his handle construction, which is a Titanium-based Damascus that anodizes at a different rate giving contrasting color in the pattern.

One of his latest designs called the "Money Friction Folder" incorporates a hole in the handle and a stop pin to convert a folding knife into a fixed blade knife.

== Collaborations ==
Snody has collaborated with knife manufacturers including Benchmade Knives, Spyderco, H&K Knives and most recently KA Bar. In 2005 Benchmade won the "Knife of the Year Award" from the Shooting Industry Academy of Excellence for the Mike Snody designed Model 425 Gravitator folding knife.

Snody designed many knives for the Heckler and Koch Knife line as an outgrowth of his collaboration with Benchmade Knives.

His recent collaboration with Ka-Bar known as the Big Boss shares many of the same design aspects of the original design produced from Snody Knives.
