= 154CM =

American martensitic stainless steel

154CM is a martensitic stainless steel developed in the United States by Crucible Steel. The grade is a modification of type 440C stainless steel, with about 4% molybdenum added. The molybdenum raises the attainable hardness and improves resistance to pitting corrosion.

The steel was created as a corrosion-resistant bearing material for aerospace use. From the 1970s onward it became widely known as a knife blade steel. It is also the basis of the powder metallurgy grade CPM 154 and of the Japanese grade ATS-34. Crucible Industries ceased production in 2025, but the composition is not patented and steels of the same chemistry remain available.

== Development ==
Crucible Steel developed 154CM in the late 1950s. The work was linked to United States Air Force research on high-temperature bearings. The aim was a stainless alternative to M50, a non-stainless bearing steel of the high-speed steel type. The designation refers to the steel's approximate chromium and molybdenum contents.

The steel reached the knife trade through the American custom knifemaker Bob Loveless. He began working with it in the early 1970s and promoted it in the knife press. According to metallurgist Larrin Thomas, his advocacy established 154CM as a premium blade material. Domestic supply in suitable sizes later became hard to obtain. Knifemakers then turned to ATS-34, a Japanese steel of closely similar composition made by Hitachi Metals. For a period, ATS-34 largely displaced 154CM in cutlery.

== Composition ==
Crucible's published nominal composition is:

Nominal composition of 154CM
Element	Content (%)
Carbon	1.05
Chromium	14.00
Molybdenum	4.00
Manganese	0.50
Silicon	0.30
Iron	balance

The high carbon and chromium contents form a large volume of hard, chromium-rich carbides. These sit in a hardened martensitic matrix. Molybdenum contributes both to carbide formation and to the corrosion resistance of the matrix.

== Properties ==
=== Heat treatment and hardness ===
154CM is austenitized at about 1,040–1,090 °C (1,900–2,000 °F). It is then quenched in oil, pressurized gas or salt, and tempered at least twice. Depending on the treatment, hardness of roughly 55–62 HRC can be reached. Knife blades are commonly finished in the upper part of that range. Tempering between about 800 and 1,100 °F (427 and 593 °C) causes sensitization. That range is avoided, because it lowers both corrosion resistance and toughness. The molybdenum also gives the steel some secondary hardening and hot hardness. Both were central to its intended use in bearings.

=== Corrosion resistance, toughness and machinability ===
At comparable hardness, 154CM resists pitting better than 440C, owing to its molybdenum content. Its toughness is broadly similar to that of 440C. Conventionally cast and rolled 154CM contains coarse carbides. These limit its toughness compared with powder-metallurgy stainless steels of similar hardness. The higher carbide volume also makes the steel harder to machine and grind than 440C. Nitriding reduces its corrosion resistance.

== Applications ==
The steel was designed for corrosion-resistant bearings running at elevated temperature. Crucible listed bearings, valve parts and bushings among its applications, alongside cutlery. In practice, it is best known as a cutlery steel. Custom and factory knifemakers have used it for blades since the 1970s. It remains in use for production folding and fixed-blade knives.

== Related grades ==
- ATS-34 – a Japanese steel of essentially the same composition. It was produced by Hitachi Metals and widely used in knives from the 1980s onward.
- CPM 154 – a powder-metallurgy version of the same chemistry, introduced by Crucible in the mid-2000s. The powder route gives a finer and more uniform carbide structure. That improves toughness, grindability and polishability at the same composition and hardness.

== Production ==
Crucible Industries was the successor company that made 154CM at its works in Solvay, New York. It filed for Chapter 11 bankruptcy protection in December 2024, after announcing the plant's closure earlier that month. In February 2025, the French producer Erasteel acquired part of the company's assets. These included inventory, intellectual property and equipment, and steelmaking at the Solvay site ended.

The composition is not covered by a patent, so the grade is not tied to a single producer. Steels of the 154CM chemistry therefore remain available. After the sale, Erasteel and the American processor Niagara Specialty Metals stated that the CPM grades would continue in production. CPM 154 keeps its established name. Supply of some grades was disrupted during the transition.

== See also ==
- List of blade materials
- Crucible Industries
