= Comparison of the AK-47 and M16 =

Comparison of the two most common assault rifles

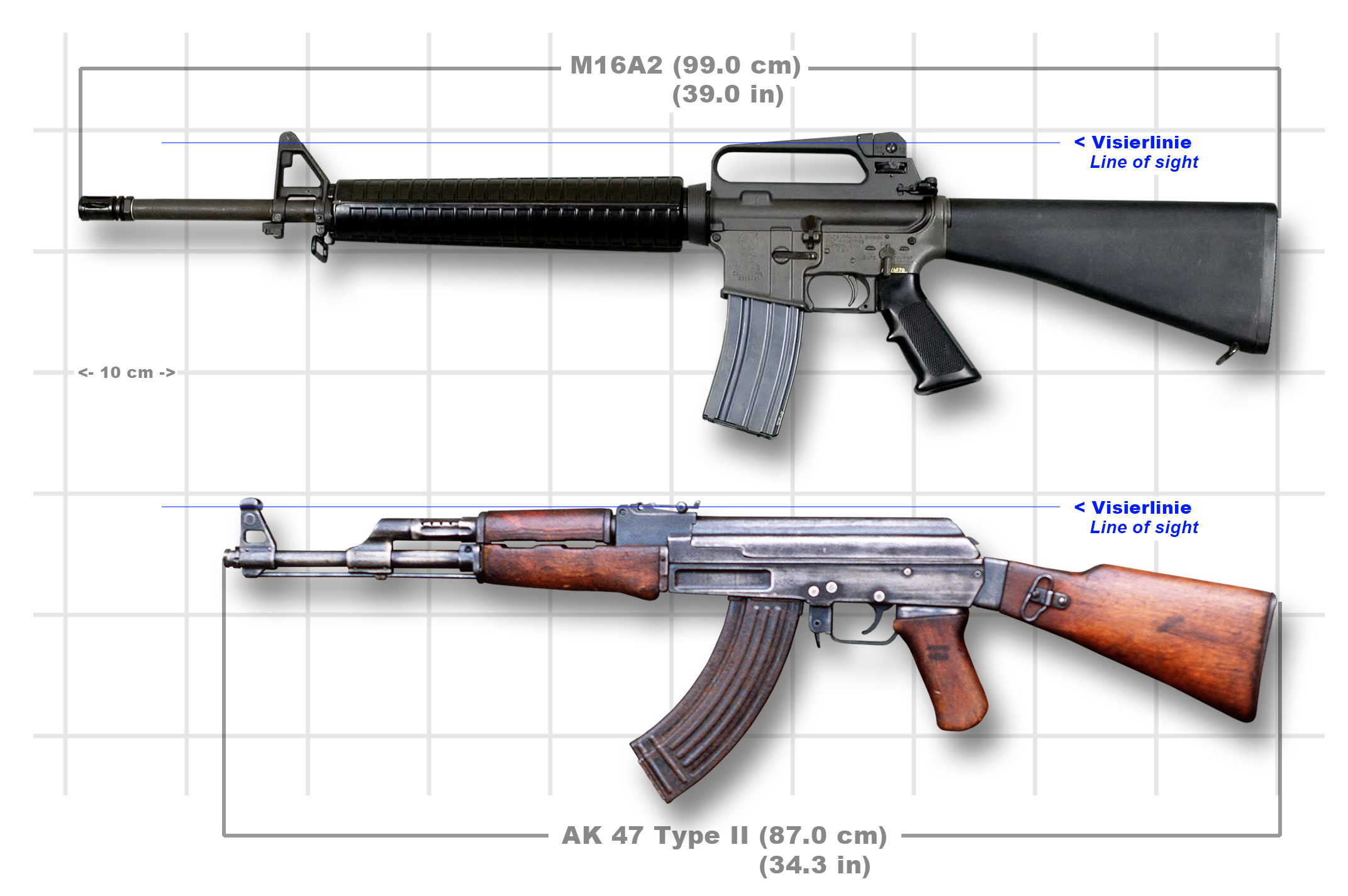
- M16A2 (top) and AK-47 (bottom) assault rifles
Firearm	AK-47	M16
Manufacturer	Kalashnikov Concern (formerly Izhmash), Tula Arms Plant, TsNIITochMash, Zastava, Norinco, Arsenal Arms	ArmaLite, Bushmaster, Colt, GM, H&R, FN, Remington, Daewoo Precision Industries, U.S. Ordnance, Elisco
Design year	1947	1959
Weight (with loaded 30-round magazine)	4.78 kg (10.5 lb)	3.6 kg (7.9 lb)
Overall length	87.0 cm (34.3 in)	99.0 cm (39.0 in)
Barrel length	40.6 cm (16.0 in)	50.8 cm (20.0 in)
Height (with magazine)	26.7 cm (10.5 in)	26.7 cm (10.5 in)
Sight radius	37.8 cm (14.9 in)	50.0 cm (19.7 in)
Cartridge	(M43) 7.62×39mm	(M193) 5.56×45mm
Bullet weight	122 gr (7.9 g)	55 gr (3.6 g)
Velocity	2,330 fps (710 m/s)	3,250 fps (990 m/s)
Energy	1,469 ft.lbs (1,991 J)	1,302 ft.lbs (1,764 J)
Effective range	380 yd (350 m)	500 yd (460 m)
Accuracy @ 100 meters	5.9 in (15 cm)	4.3 in (11 cm)
Penetration (ballistic Gelatin)	≈29 in (74 cm)	≈14 in (36 cm)
Rate of fire	600 rounds/min	700–950 rounds/min
Standard magazine capacity	30 rounds	30 rounds
Designer	Mikhail Kalashnikov	Eugene Stoner
Variants	AK-47, AKS-47, AKM, AKMS, AK-74, AKS-74U, RPK, RPK-74, AK-100 series, AK-12, PP-19 Bizon, PP-19-01 Vityaz	AR-15, M16, XM16E1, M16A1, M16A2, M16A3, M16A4, M4, M4A1, Mk 12, Mk 18, Colt LMG, Colt 9mm SMG, Colt Canada C7, Colt Canada C8
Numbers made	~75 million ~100 million Kalashnikov–style rifles	~8 million ~28 million AR-15–style rifles
Unit cost	$700 to $800 per unit for a new AK-103	$700 per unit for a new M4

The two most common assault rifles in the world are the Soviet AK-47 and the American M16. These Cold War-era rifles have been used in conflicts both large and small since the 1960s. They are used by military, police, security forces, revolutionaries, terrorists, criminals, and civilians alike and will most likely continue to be used for decades to come. As a result, they have been the subject of countless comparisons and endless debate.

The AK-47 was influenced by the design of the German StG 44. It was finalized, adopted, and entered widespread service in the Soviet Army in the early 1950s. Its firepower, ease of use, low production costs, and reliability were perfectly suited for the Soviet Army's new mobile warfare doctrines. More AK-type weapons have been produced than all other assault rifles combined. In 1974, the Soviets began replacing their AK-47 and AKM rifles with a newer design, the AK-74, which uses 5.45×39mm ammunition.

The M16 was adapted from the ArmaLite AR-15, and entered United States military service in the mid-1960s. Despite its early failures, the M16 proved to be a revolutionary design and stands as the longest-continuously serving rifle in American military history. The U.S. military has largely replaced the M16 in combat units with a shorter and lighter version called the M4 carbine.

== History ==
=== Sturmgewehr 44 ===
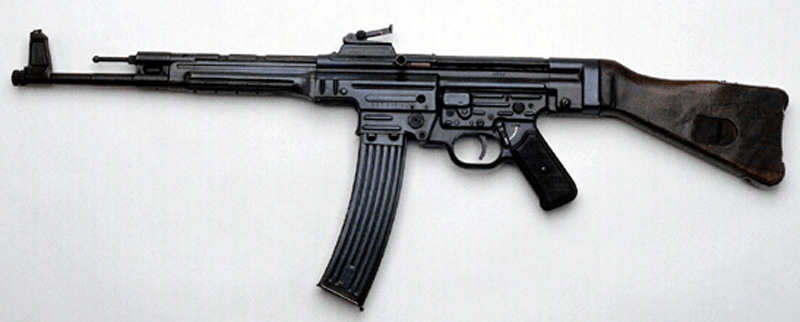
The German Sturmgewehr 44

The Germans pioneered the assault rifle concept during World War II, based upon research that showed that most firefights happen within 400 meters and that contemporary rifles were overpowered for most small arms combat. They would soon develop a select-fire, intermediate-powered rifle, combining the firepower of a submachine gun with the range and accuracy of a rifle.

The result was the Sturmgewehr 44, which the Germans produced in large numbers; approximately half a million were made. It fired a new and revolutionary intermediate-powered cartridge, the 7.92×33mm Kurz. This new cartridge was developed by shortening the standard 7.92×57mm Mauser round and giving it a lighter 125-grain bullet that limited range but allowed for more controllable automatic fire. The smaller, lighter cartridge also allowed soldiers to carry more ammunition "to support the higher consumption rate of automatic fire."

The Sturmgewehr 44 features an inexpensive, easy-to-make, stamped steel design and a 30-round detachable box magazine. "This weapon was the prototype of all successful automatic rifles. Characteristically (and unlike previous rifles and the M14 rifle) it had a straight stock with the barrel under the gas cylinder to reduce the turning moment of recoil of the rifle in the shoulder and thus help reduce the tendency of shots to climb in automatic fire. The barrel and overall length were shorter than a traditional rifle and it had a pistol grip to hold the weapon more securely in automatic fire. The principle of this weapon — the reduction of muzzle impulse to get usable automatic fire within the actual ranges of combat — was probably the most important advance in small arms since the invention of smokeless powder."

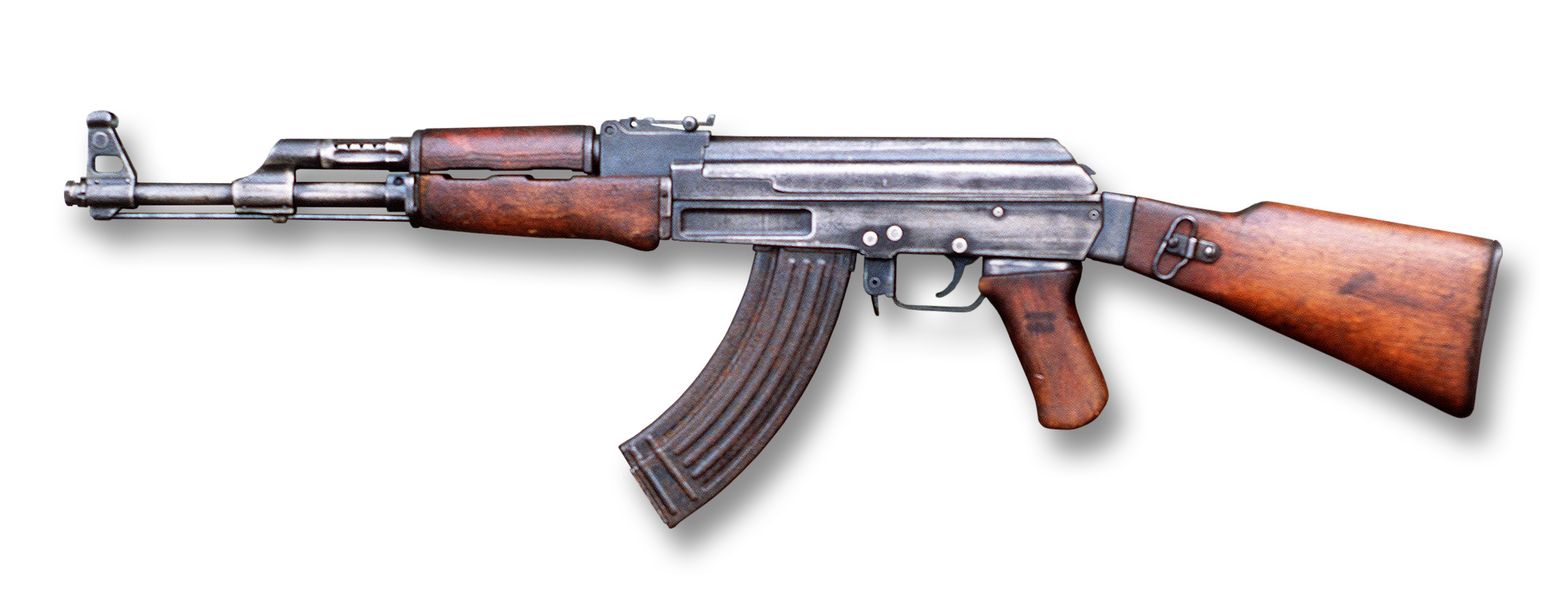
An AK-47 with machined receiver

=== AK-47 ===
Like the Germans, the Soviets were influenced by experience showing most combat happens within 400 meters and that their soldiers were consistently outgunned by heavily armed German troops, especially those armed with the Sturmgewehr 44 assault rifles. On July 15, 1943, a Sturmgewehr was demonstrated before the People's Commissariat of Arms of the USSR. The Soviets were so impressed with the Sturmgewehr, that they immediately set about developing an intermediate caliber automatic rifle of their own, to replace the PPSh-41 submachine guns and badly outdated Mosin–Nagant bolt-action rifles that armed most of the Soviet Army. The Soviets soon developed the 7.62×39mm M43 cartridge, the semi-automatic SKS carbine, and the RPD light machine gun. Shortly after World War II, the Soviets developed the AK-47 assault rifle, which would quickly replace the SKS in Soviet service. The AK-47 was finalized, adopted, and entered widespread service in the Soviet army in the early 1950s. Its firepower, ease of use, low production costs, and reliability were perfectly suited for the Red Army's new mobile warfare doctrines. In the 1960s, the Soviets introduced the RPK light machine gun, itself an AK-47-type weapon with a bi-pod, a stronger receiver, and a longer, heavier barrel that would eventually replace the RPD light machine gun.

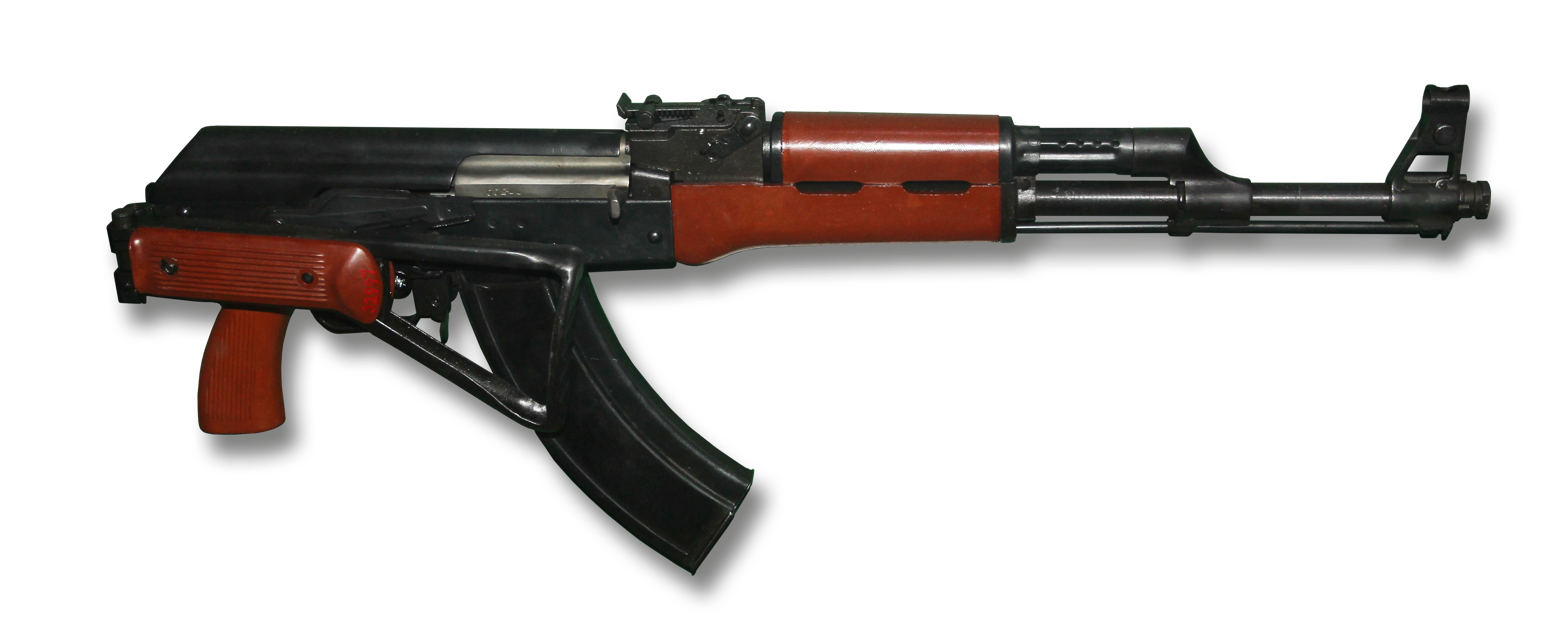
Chinese Type 56–2, folding stock variant

The AK-47 was widely supplied or sold to nations allied with the USSR, and the blueprints were shared with several friendly nations (the People's Republic of China standing out among these with the Type 56). As a result, more AK-type weapons have been produced than all other assault rifles combined. "Of the estimated 500 million firearms worldwide, approximately 100 million belong to the Kalashnikov family, three-quarters of which are AK-47s."

=== M14 rifle ===
On the other hand, the U.S. Army was influenced by combat experience with semi-automatic weapons such as the M1 Garand and M1 Carbine, which enjoyed a significant advantage over enemies armed primarily with bolt-action rifles. Although U.S. Army studies of World War II combat accounts had very similar results to those of the Germans and Soviets, the U.S. Army failed to recognize the importance of the assault rifle concept, and instead maintained its traditional views and preference for high-powered semi-automatic rifles. At the time, the U.S. Army believed that the Sturmgewehr 44 was "intended in a general way to serve the same purpose as the U.S. carbine" and was in many ways inferior to the M1 carbine, and was of "little importance".

After World War II, the United States military started looking for a single automatic rifle to replace the M1 Garand, M1/M2 Carbines, M1918 Browning Automatic Rifle, M3 "Grease Gun" and Thompson submachine gun. However, early experiments with select-fire versions of the M1 Garand proved disappointing. During the Korean War, the select-fire M2 Carbine largely replaced the submachine gun in US service and became the most widely used Carbine variant. However, combat experience suggested that the .30 Carbine round was underpowered. American weapons designers reached the same conclusion as the Germans and Soviets: an intermediate round was necessary, and recommended a small-caliber, high-velocity cartridge.

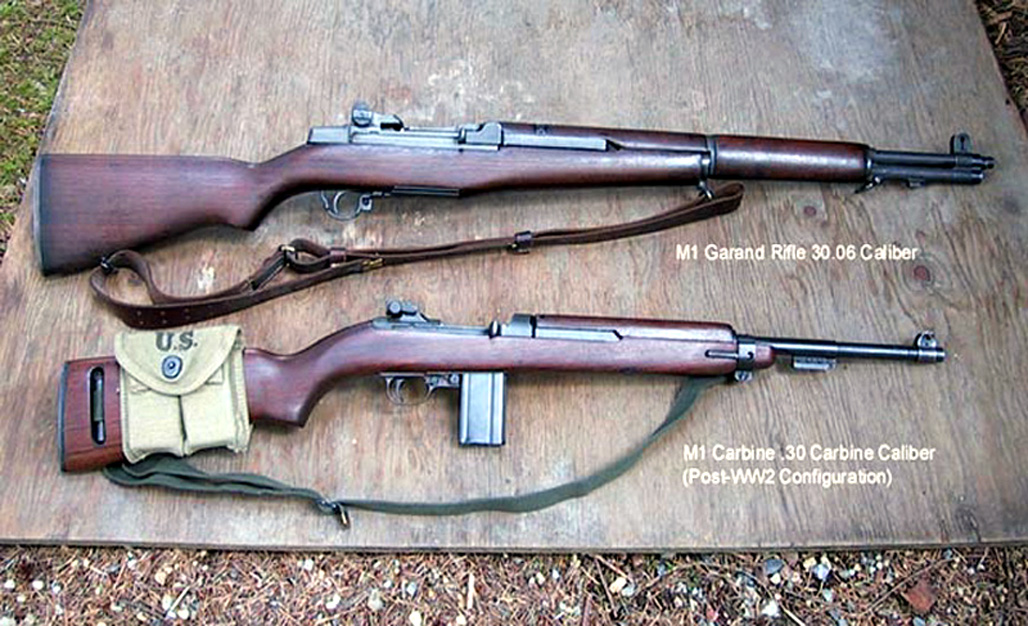
M1 Garand and M1 carbine

However, senior American commanders–having experienced major logistical problems during WWII and the Korean War–insisted that a single, powerful .30 caliber cartridge be developed, capable of being used by both the new automatic rifle and the new general-purpose machine gun (GPMG) in concurrent development. This culminated in the development of the 7.62×51mm NATO cartridge.

The United States Army then began testing several rifles to replace the obsolete M1 Garand. Springfield Armory's T44E4 and heavier T44E5 were essentially updated versions of the Garand chambered for the new 7.62 mm round, while Fabrique Nationale submitted their FN FAL as the T48. ArmaLite entered the competition late, hurriedly submitting several AR-10 prototype rifles in the fall of 1956 to the United States Army's Springfield Armory for testing.

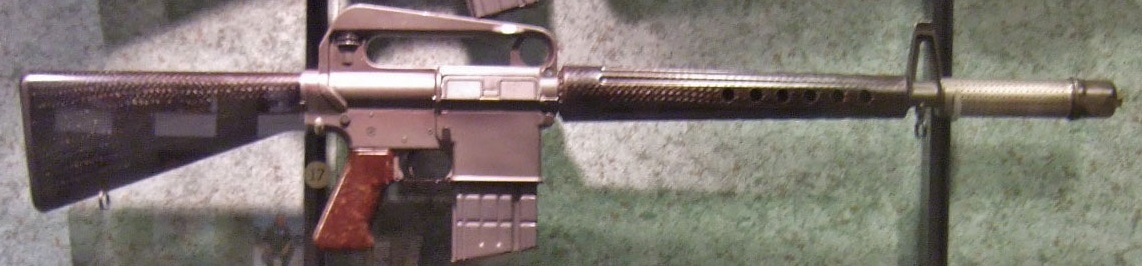
AR-10 rifle

The AR-10 featured an innovative straight-line barrel/stock design, forged aluminum alloy receivers, and phenolic composite stocks. It had rugged elevated sights, an oversized aluminum flash suppressor and recoil compensator, and an adjustable gas system. The final prototype featured an upper and lower receiver with the now-familiar hinge and takedown pins, and the charging handle was on top of the receiver placed inside of the carry handle. For a 7.62mm NATO rifle, the AR-10 was incredibly lightweight at only 6.85 lbs. empty. Initial comments by Springfield Armory test staff were favorable, and some testers commented that the AR-10 was the best lightweight automatic rifle ever tested by the Armory.

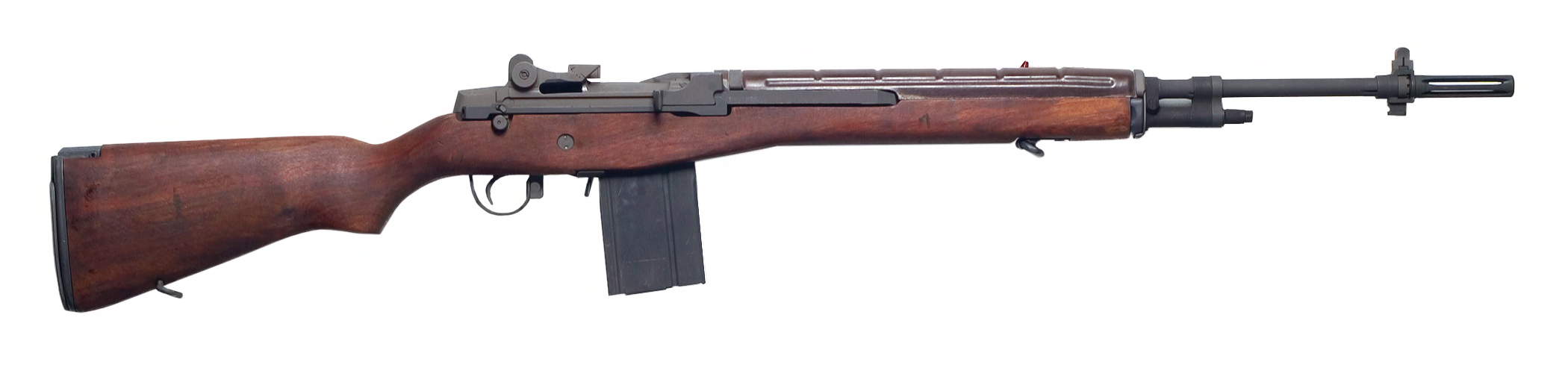
M14 rifle

In the end, the United States Army chose the T44, now called the M14 rifle–an improved M1 Garand with a 20-round magazine and automatic fire capability. The U.S. also adopted the M60 general-purpose machine gun (GPMG). Its NATO partners adopted the FN FAL and HK G3 rifles, as well as the FN MAG and Rheinmetall MG3 GPMGs.

=== M16 rifle ===
The first confrontations between the AK-47 and the M14 came in the early part of the Vietnam War. Battlefield reports indicated that the M14 was uncontrollable in full-auto and that soldiers could not carry enough ammo to maintain fire superiority over the AK-47. And, while the M2 Carbine offered a high rate of fire, it was underpowered and ultimately outclassed by the AK-47. A replacement was needed: A medium between the traditional preference for high-powered rifles such as the M14, and the lightweight firepower of the M2 Carbine.

As a result, the Army was forced to reconsider a 1957 request by General Willard G. Wyman, commander of the U.S. Continental Army Command (CONARC) to develop a .223 caliber (5.56 mm) select-fire rifle weighing 6 lbs (2.7 kg) when loaded with a 20-round magazine. The 5.56mm round had to penetrate a standard U.S. helmet at 500 yards (460 meters) and retain a velocity over the speed of sound while matching or exceeding the wounding ability of the .30 Carbine cartridge.

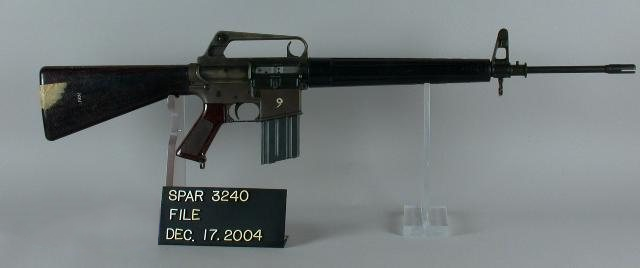
ArmaLite AR-15 with 25-round magazine

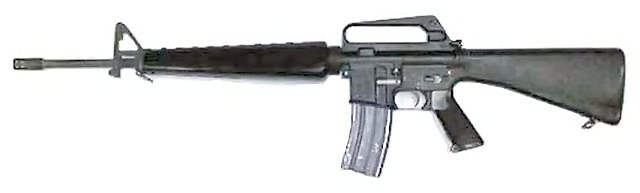
An M16A1 with 30-round magazine

This request ultimately resulted in the development of a scaled-down version of the Armalite AR-10, called the ArmaLite AR-15 rifle. However, despite overwhelming evidence that the AR-15 could bring more firepower to bear than the M14, the Army opposed the adoption of the new rifle. In January 1963, Secretary of Defense Robert McNamara concluded that the AR-15 was the superior weapon system and ordered a halt to M14 production. At the time, the AR-15 was the only rifle available that could fulfill the requirement of a universal infantry weapon for issue to all services.

After modifications (most notably, the charging handle was re-located from under the carrying handle like the AR-10 to the rear of the receiver), the newly redesigned rifle was subsequently adopted as the M16 Rifle. "(The M16) was much lighter compared to the M14 it replaced, ultimately allowing soldiers to carry more ammunition. The air-cooled, gas-operated, magazine-fed assault rifle was made of steel, aluminum alloy, and composite plastics, truly cutting-edge for the time. Designed with full and semi-automatic capabilities, the weapon initially did not respond well to wet and dirty conditions, sometimes even jamming in combat. After a few minor modifications, the weapon gained in popularity among troops on the battlefield."

Despite its early failures, the M16 proved to be a revolutionary design and stands as the longest continuously serving rifle in American military history. It has been adopted by many U.S. allies and the 5.56×45mm NATO cartridge has become not only the NATO standard but "the standard assault rifle cartridge in much of the world." It also led to the development of small-caliber, high-velocity service rifles by every major army in the world, including the USSR and the People's Republic of China. It has been called a benchmark against which other assault rifles are judged.

== Manufacturing philosophies ==
=== M16 ===
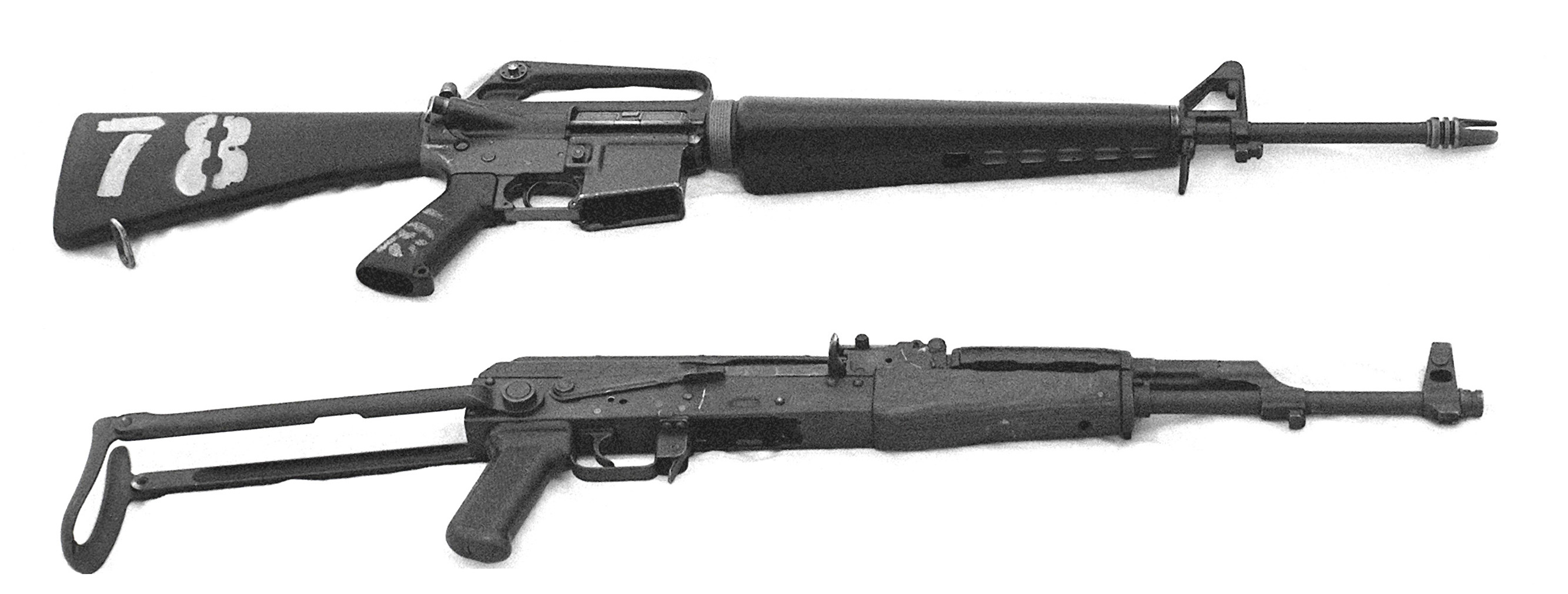
A U.S. M16A1 rifle (top) is compared to a Soviet AKMS rifle.

The M16 is a select-fire, 5.56×45mm, air-cooled, internal-piston gas-operated, magazine-fed rifle, with a rotating bolt and straight-line recoil design. Above all else, the M16 was designed to be a lightweight assault rifle and to fire a new lightweight, high-velocity small caliber cartridge to allow the soldier to carry more ammunition. It was designed to be manufactured with the extensive use of aluminum and synthetic materials by state-of-the-art Computer Numerical Control (CNC) automated machinery. The M16 is a Modular Weapon System, easily configured as an assault rifle, a carbine, a submachine gun, and an open-bolt squad automatic weapon.It is easy to assemble, modify, and repair using a few simple hand tools, and a flat surface to work on.

At peak production, Colt's manufacturing capacity was approximately 333,000 units per year. The M16 continues to benefit from every advance in the CNC field, which allows more and more small manufacturers to mass-produce M16s and semi-automatic AR-15 type rifles. (Note: List of M16/AR-15 type rifles: Adcor Defense, Alberta Tactical Rifle Supply, Alexander Arms, American Spirit Arms, American Weapon Systems, ArmaLite, Barrett Firearms Manufacturing, Black Rain Ordnance, Bushmaster Firearms International, Bravo company manufacturing, C3 Defense, Charles Daly firearms, Colt's Manufacturing Company, CORE15 Rifle Systems, CMMG, Crusader Weaponry, Daniel Defense, Del-Ton, Diemaco/Colt Canada, Doublestar Corp, DPMS Panther Arms, DSA/DS arms inc., Franklin Armory, LAR Grizzly manufacturing, Heckler and Koch, High Standard Manufacturing Company, Hogan guns, Huldra Arms, JP Enterprises, Izhmash/Molot Russia (rumored), Knight's Armament Company, LaRue Tactical, Legion Firearms, Les Baer, Lewis Machine and Tool Company, LWRCI /Land Warfare Resources Corporation International, North East Arms, Next Generation Arms, Norinco (China), Oberland Arms, Olympic Arms, Palmetto State Armory, Palmetto State Defense, Para-USA/Para-Ordnance, Patriot Defense Arms, POF-USA Patriot ordnance factory, Remington Arms, Rock River Arms, Sabre Defence/Manroy USA, Seekins Precision, Sharps Rifle Company/Sharps rifle, Sig Sauer, Smith & Wesson, Special Ops Tactical, Spikes Tactical, Stag Arms, Sturm Ruger, Vulcan Armament, Wilson Combat, Windham Weaponry, Yankee Hill Machine, Z-M Weapons,) The M16's aluminum lower receivers may be forged or cast. Their receivers may also be made from titanium and a variety of other metallic alloys, composites or polymers. If necessary, the M16 can be machined from a billet of steel and fitted with wooden furniture. The M16's internal components such as the bolt carrier group and charging handle may also be made of titanium. The M16's aluminum receiver and other parts may even be 3D printed, allowing "people with no gunsmith training to assemble a working assault rifle at home". This makes the M16 ideal for market economy production, spread among many small manufacturers around the country, using a variety of materials and manufacturing methods; this ensures it would be nearly impossible to disrupt U.S. M16 rifle production in the case of a major conflict.

As of 2015, the United States military buys M4 Carbines for $647 (USD) per unit. Approximately 8 million M16 type rifles have been made worldwide.

=== AK-47 ===
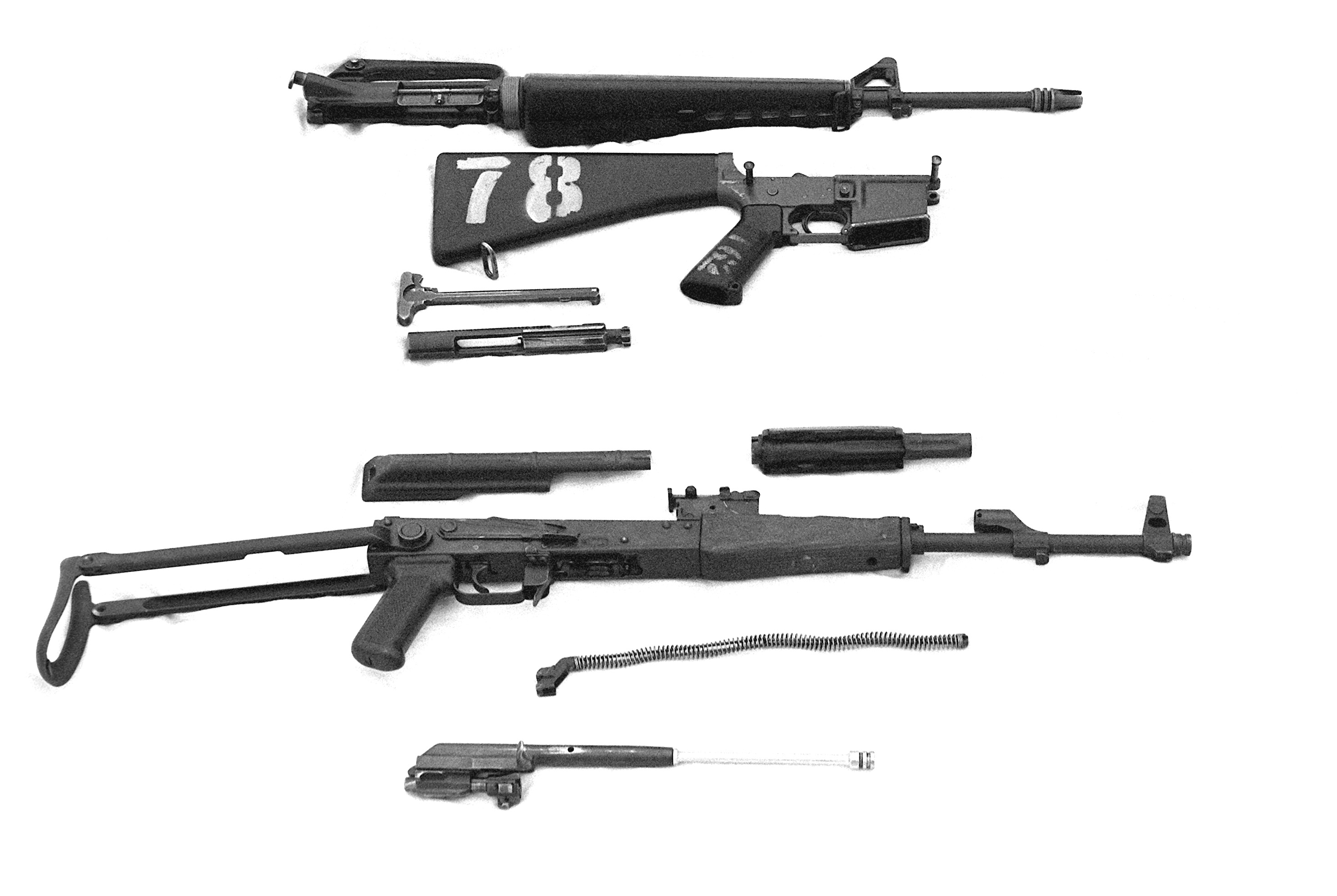
A U.S. M16A1 rifle (top) is compared to a Soviet AKMS rifle. The two rifles are disassembled into groups.

In addition to having better reliability and a larger caliber, the AK-47 is cheaper than the M16. The price of an AK-47 in Somalia is equal to what would be $400 in the United States. One standard 30-round magazine is 9 to 15 cents.

The AK-47 is a select-fire, 7.62×39mm, air-cooled, long-stroke-piston gas-operated, magazine-fed rifle, with a rotating bolt. It was designed to be a simple, reliable automatic rifle that could be manufactured quickly and cheaply, using mass production methods that were state of the art in the Soviet Union during the late 1940s. The AK-47's barrel and bolt were milled out of a steel billet and hard chromed. Its receiver was originally designed to be stamped from sheet metal with a milled trunnion insert. However, there were many difficulties during the initial phase of production causing high rejection rates due to faulty receivers. Instead of halting production, a heavy forged steel machined receiver was substituted for the sheet metal receiver. This was a more costly and time-consuming process, but advanced the program's development and accelerated production. The AK's furniture was simply made out of wood, which was a non-strategic material, and perfectly fits the Soviet manufacturing philosophy, where large manufacturing plants produce basic weapons in very large quantities.

In 1959, the sheet metal stamping process was perfected, simplifying production and reducing the weight of the rifle from 3.87 kg (8.5 lb) to 2.93 kg (6.5 lb) without a magazine. Most of the AK-type rifles in use today are of this lighter stamped-steel AKM variety. Over time, AK production has been simplified through the use of rivets, spot welding, and by further reducing the number of machined parts.

Current model AKs are made using modern manufacturing processes and have many parts produced by investment casting. they're chambered in 7.62×39mm (AK-103), 5.45×39mm (AK-74M) and 5.56×45mm (AK-101), with cold hammer forged barrels. many incorporate synthetic/plastic furniture, such as folding stocks, handguards, and pistol grips.

At peak production, Kalashnikov Concern (formerly Izhmash) can produce around 95 units per hour (about 832,000 units per year). Because of its stamped-steel design, it is not possible to manufacture the AK-47 series efficiently in small plants, due to the large amount of metal stamping equipment needed for mass production. However, the milled-steel AK-47 has spawned a cottage industry of sorts and has been copied and manufactured (one gun at a time) in small shops around the world.

As of 2014, Kalashnikov Concern sells the AK-103 at a government price of $150 to $160 (USD) per unit. There are places around the world where an AK-47 type rifle can be purchased on the Black Market "for as little as $6, or traded for a chicken or a sack of grain." Approximately 100 million AK-47-type rifles have been made worldwide.

== Comparison of characteristics ==
=== Size and weight ===
	AK-47	M16A1	AKM (Note: Most of the AK type rifles in use today are of the lighter stamped-steel AKM variety.)	M16A2 (Note: The M16A2 weighs more and is slightly longer than the original, with the addition of heavier (and more accurate) barrels, improved sights and more rugged furniture.)	AK-103	M4
Barrel length	41.5 cm (16.3 in)	50.8 cm (20.0 in)	41.5 cm (16.3 in)	50.8 cm (20.0 in)	41.5 cm (16.3 in)	36.8 cm (14.5 in)
Overall length	87 cm (34 in)	99 cm (39 in)	87 cm (34 in)	100.64 cm (39.62 in)	94.3 cm (37.1 in)	83.8 cm (33.0 in)
Length with shortened stock	N/A	N/A	N/A	N/A	70.5 cm (27.8 in) side-folding stock	75.6 cm (29.8 in) telescoping stock
Weight of rifle with loaded magazine (Note: Earlier versions of the AK used wood furniture, the type and density of which causes the AKs weight to vary. Whereas, the M16 and current models of the AK use synthetic materials, which have consistent weights.)	4.78 kg (10.5 lb)	3.6 kg (7.9 lb)	3.75 kg (8.3 lb)	3.99 kg (8.8 lb)	4.1 kg (9.0 lb)	3.33 kg (7.3 lb)
Weight of loaded 30-round magazine	slab-sided steel magazine 0.92 kg (2.0 lb).	aluminum magazine 0.45 kg (0.99 lb)	stamped-steel magazine 0.82 kg (1.8 lb)	aluminum magazine 0.45 kg (0.99 lb)	steel-reinforced plastic magazine 0.74 kg (1.6 lb)	aluminum magazine 0.45 kg (0.99 lb)

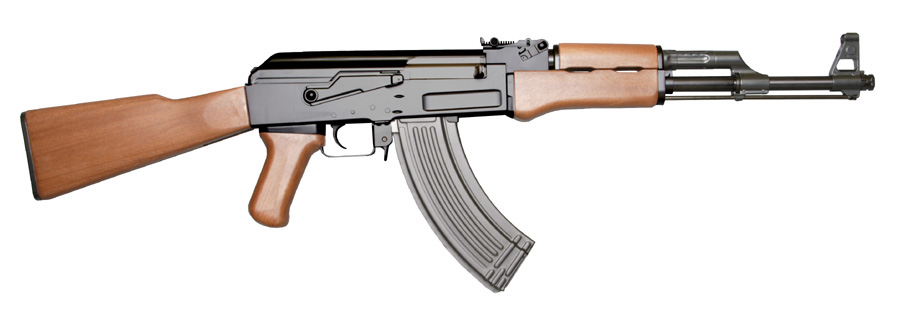
Vietnam-era AK-47.

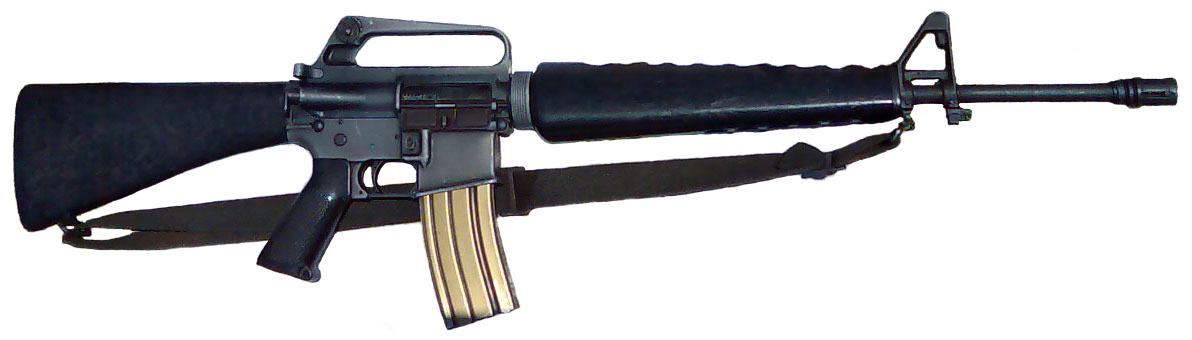
Vietnam-era M16A1

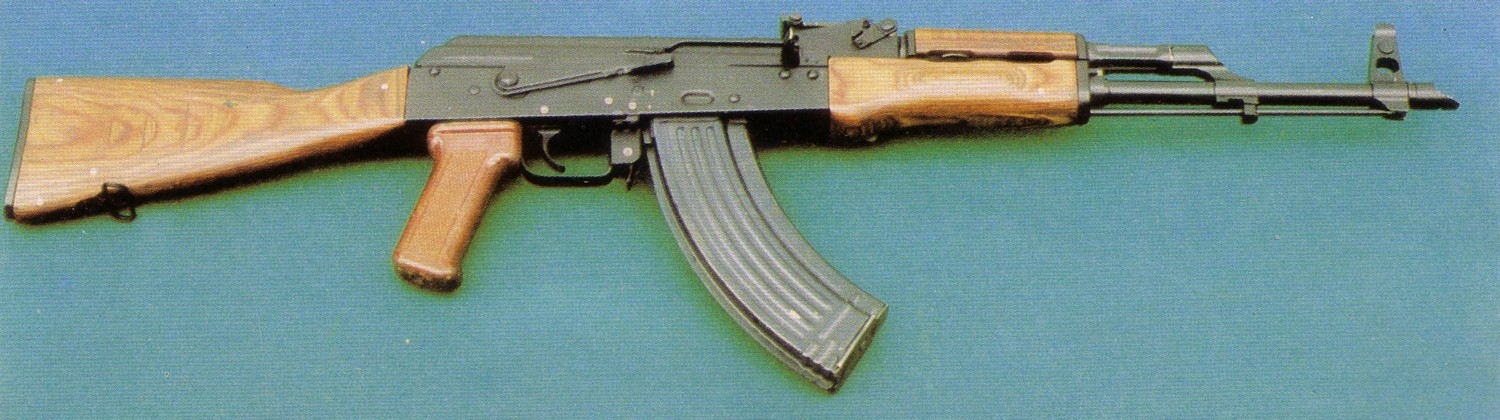
AKM with lighter stamped-steel receiver and muzzle-brake

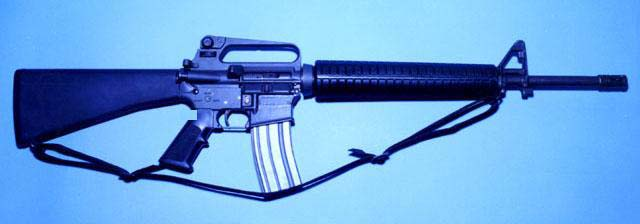
M16A2 with new adjustable rear sight, case deflector, heavy barrel, and improved furniture.

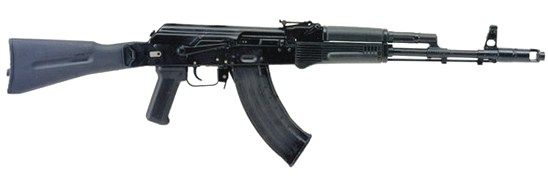
Current AK-103 with compensator, side-folding stock, and synthetic furniture.

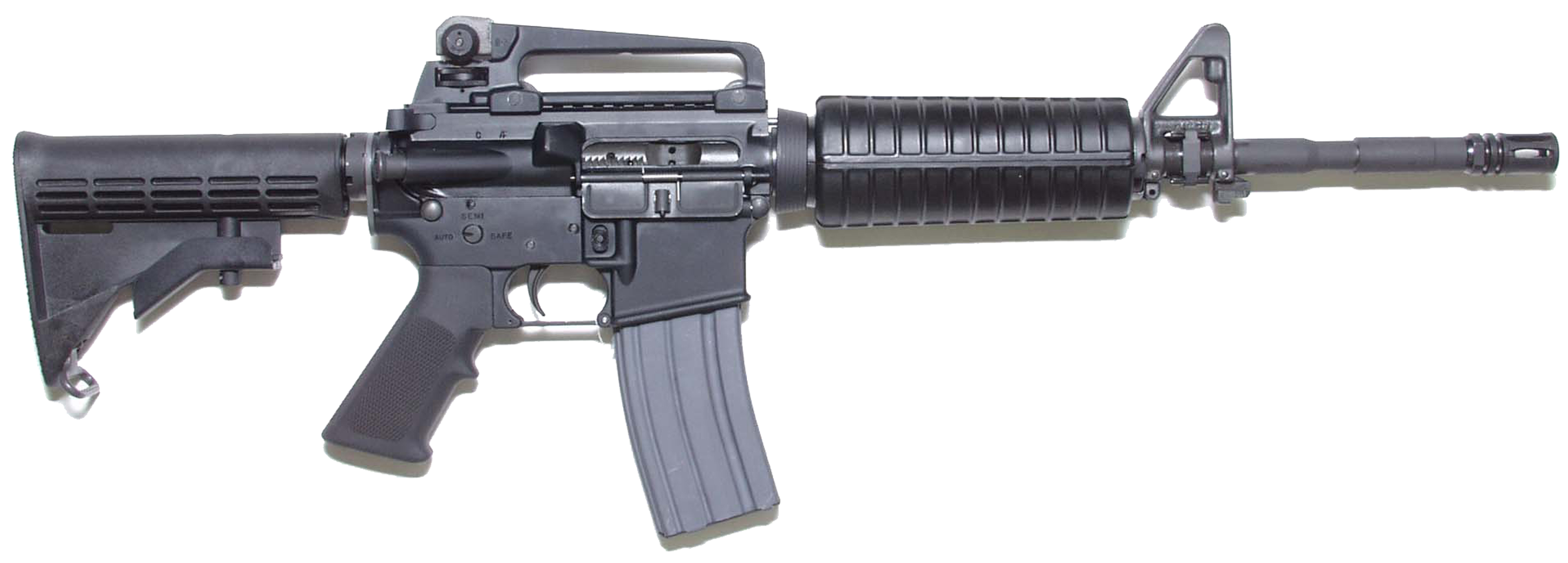
Current M4A1 carbine with detachable carrying handle.

=== Ergonomics ===
"The AR-15 made use of high-impact fiberlite stocks, pistol grips, and handguards. A selector lever on the left side of the rifle could be manipulated with the shooter’s right thumb without removing the hand from the pistol grip. The magazine release, on the right side of the receiver, could be operated with the trigger finger; when pressed, the magazine would drop free.

A fresh magazine, requiring no camming — or ‘rocking’ — could be inserted straight into the magazine well. This attribute contributed significantly to speedy reloading in combat situations compared to the AK-47/AKM. These are two of the main reasons why the AR-15/M16-series rifles are considered the finest human-engineered assault rifles in the world.

A bolt catch mechanism is located on the left side of the rifle. When the last round was fired, the magazine follower would elevate the bolt catch and lock the bolt to the rear. After inserting a full magazine, the rifleman would push in on the upper portion of the bolt catch to release the bolt and load the rifle. The receivers, produced from 7075 T6 aircraft aluminum, which helps keep the rifle lightweight and dissipates heat better than conventional metals, are hard-anodized with a non-reflective matte gray weather-resistant finish. Both weapons were then subjected to a "limited" endurance test by firing six magazines as fast as they could be loaded into the weapon; this was to mimic what would be the worst-case patrol usage. As expected, neither weapon exhibited any problems, feeding and firing every round without issue. It was, however, during this portion of the test that one of the AR system's true advantages came into sharp focus—superior ergonomics.

The AR-15 is considered to be one of the most ergonomic weapon designs to ever be fielded in large numbers. During the six-magazine endurance test, which admittedly was not a true endurance test but rather a proof of ability test, all evaluators found that it was much easier to change magazines and get the weapon back into action quickly with the AR-15 design than with the AK-47 design.

This enhanced performance was due to several factors, not the least of which is the ability to simply insert the magazine into the AR in a conventional manner rather than the "rock and lock" method required with the AK platform. Also noted here was the ability of the AR users to leave their strong hand on the weapon and in control while performing magazine changes and charging the weapon. Users of the AK found that while some people are capable of doing so, this was a much more cumbersome operation with this platform than with the AR design.

Also in the realm of ergonomics is the placement of the manual safety. With the AR, this is a lever located on the left side of the weapon that is capable of being manipulated with the thumb of the strong hand while still retaining a grip on the weapon. With the AK—on most variants—the safety is a large lever on the right side of the weapon.

Both weapon designs have been thoroughly tested in every climate on the planet and have proven themselves in combat for the past three and a half decades—so further, "endurance" testing would be pointless. What this test did was allow for the weapons to get extremely hot and provided for the operators to judge the now-hot weapon based on how well they could use it without gloved hands. In each case, both weapons were judged to be very usable but the AR got the nod as the most desirable weapon. This again was due to the ergonomic placement of controls, which keeps the hands away from any part of the weapon that is susceptible to heat transfer." It is much easier and faster to change magazines and get the M16 back into action than with the AK-47. This is due to several factors, such as the location of the magazine release and bolt release buttons, a flared magazine well for fast magazine insertions, and the ability to simply insert the magazine into the M16 in a conventional manner, rather than the "rock and lock" method required with the AK-47. In addition, it is easier for an M16 user to keep a strong hand on the pistol grip and sights on the target while performing magazine changes than with the AK-47.

The M16 has a well-designed safety lever located on the left side of the weapon that is easily manipulated by the user's thumb while maintaining a strong hold on the pistol grip. With the AK-47 the safety is a large lever on the right side of the weapon that is not at all easy to manipulate. "It is slow, uncomfortable, and sometimes stiff to operate." For most users, the hand must come off the pistol grip to either apply or disengage the safety. It also makes a "loud and distinctive click" when used. While the fire selector "is considered by many as the main drawback of the whole AK design", its most frequently criticized feature is its trigger mechanism. "The Kalashnikov trigger system, conceptually derived from that of the U.S. .30 M1 Garand rifle, is all too often plagued with an objectionable, and sometimes quite painful, "trigger slap" and a creepy and unpredictable trigger pull."

M16	AK-47
Carrying handle
The M16's most distinctive ergonomic feature is the carrying handle and rear sight assembly on top of the receiver. Current issue M16A4s and M4s have detachable carrying handles and use Picatinny rails which allow for the use of various scopes and sighting devices.	The AK-47 does not have a carrying-handle.
Fire selector
The fire selector is located on the left side of the rifle just above the pistol grip and is rotated by the shooter's right thumb. When the selector points forward = safe, up = semi-auto and backward = full-auto or burst. To use, the selector is rotated 90 degrees clockwise (down and forward) into the semi-auto position and then rotated an additional 90 degrees clockwise (forward and up) into the full-auto or burst position. To return to safe the selector is then rotated 180 degrees counter-clockwise (down, backward and up). Some M16 type rifles also have an ambidextrous fire selector on the right side of the receiver, designed to be operated by a left-handed shooter's thumb. This selector mirrors its opposite and functions as describe above.	The fire selector is a large lever located on the right side of the rifle; it acts as a dust-cover and prevents the charging handle from being pulled fully to the rear when it is on safe. It is operated by the shooter's right fore-fingers and it has 3 settings: up = safe, center = full-auto and down = semi-auto. The reason for this is that, when under stress, a soldier will push the selector lever down with considerable force bypassing the full-auto stage and setting the rifle to semi-auto. To set the AK-47 to full-auto requires the deliberate action of centering the selector lever. Some AK-47 type rifles also have a small vertical selector lever on the left side of the receiver just above the pistol grip. This lever is operated by the shooter's right thumb and has three settings: forward = safe, center = full-auto and backwards = semi-auto.
Charging handle
The charging handle is located on top of the receiver, below and to the rear of the rear sight/carrying handle. To chamber, simply insert a loaded magazine straight into the magazine well, then pull the cocking handle back and release. The charging handle does not reciprocate while firing.	The charging handle is located on the right side of the receiver. To chamber, simply rock a loaded magazine into the magazine well in a forward to back motion, then pull the cocking handle back and release. The charging handle reciprocates (moves back and forth) while firing.
Magazine release
The magazine release is a push button, located on the right side of the receiver in front of the trigger. To reload, the magazine release is pushed in, the empty magazine falls out and a loaded magazine is then inserted straight into the magazine well.	The magazine release is a lever located directly in front of and just below the trigger guard. To reload push the magazine release lever forward, the empty magazine is removed and a loaded magazine is then rocked into the opening at the bottom of the receiver in a forward to back motion.
Bolt-stop/release
The bolt-stop/release is located on the left side of the receiver and the bolt-carrier-assembly locks back after the last shot. After reloading, the bolt-stop is pushed, the bolt-carrier-assembly is released, and the rifle is chambered and ready to fire. Also, leaving the bolt open for as long as possible aids in cooling and prevent cartridges from "cooking off."	Does not have a bolt-stop/release and does not lock back on the last shot. After reloading, simply pull back and release the charging handle, and the rifle is chambered and ready to fire.
Forward-assist
The M16A1 and later models have a separate forward-assist on the right side to the rear of the receiver which is operated by pushing it forward.	The charging handle also acts as a forward assist which is operated by pushing it forward.
Dust cover
Has a spring-loaded dust-cover, which opens when the rifle is fired or chambered. The dust-cover must be closed manually.	The fire selector doubles as a dust-cover when set to "safe".
Trigger-pull
pull weight of 5.5 to 9.0 pounds; creep of .04 to .05 inches; mechanical energy of .22 to .45 inch pounds	pull weight of 3.0 to 7.0 pounds; creep of .15 inches; mechanical energy of .45 to 1.05 inch pounds
Trigger-guard
The M16s trigger-guard can be lowered to allow the trigger to be pulled while wearing winter mittens.	The AK-47s trigger-guard is fixed and "does not lend itself well to trigger operation wearing heavy gloves." However the AK-47's trigger guard is larger and has more room inside it than other similar weapons, somewhat mitigating the issue.
Cartridge deflector
To prevent hot shell casings from hitting a left handed shooter's face, older M16s had a plastic cartridge deflector attachment that is mounted in the carrying handle. Current model M16s have a cartridge deflector bump built into the upper receiver.	The AK-47 has no need for a cartridge deflector, as it ejects spent shell casings to the right at a forward and upward angle.
Forestocks
The M16 gets extremely hot when fired for prolonged periods. However, early model M16s use a large well-insulated triangular shaped forestock to protect the shooter's hands. The M16A2 and later models use rounded forestocks, that are stronger, more ergonomic and better insulated.	The AK-47 also gets extremely hot when fired for prolonged periods. However, the AK-47 has a small poorly-insulated fore-stock that overheats quickly making the AK hard to handle. The AK-47's wooden fore-stocks have even been known to catch fire if magazines are shot quickly enough on full-auto. Some older AK type rifles have vertical foregrips which make it easier to control and cooler to the touch making the AK easier to handle as it overheats.
Collapsing buttstocks
The M16 has variants with shortened barrels and adjustable telescoping buttstocks.	The AK-47 has variants with both standard and shortened barrels, and both under- and side-folding buttstocks.

=== Recoil ===
Skilled soldiers with either the AK-47 and M16 are effective. However, the M16's internal-piston gas operation system, straight-line recoil design, and smaller caliber give it less recoil than the AK-47 and make it easier to control in full-auto.

"The (M16's) Stoner system provides a very symmetric design that allows straight line movement of the operating components. This allows recoil forces to drive straight to the rear. Instead of connecting or other mechanical parts driving the system, high-pressure gas performs this function, reducing the weight of moving parts and the rifle as a whole." The M16's straight-line recoil design, where the recoil spring is located in the stock directly behind the action, and serves the dual function of operating spring and recoil buffer. The stock being in line with the bore also reduces muzzle rise, especially during automatic fire. Because recoil does not significantly shift the point of aim, faster follow-up shots are possible and user fatigue is reduced. Also, current model M16 flash-suppressors act as compensators to reduce recoil further.

With the AK-47's long-stroke piston gas system, the piston is mechanically fixed to the bolt group and moves through the entire operating cycle. The primary disadvantage to this system is the disruption of the point of aim due to the center of mass changing during the action cycle and energetic and abrupt stops at the beginning and end of bolt carrier travel. However, the AK-47's heavier weight and slower rate of fire do a good job of mitigating any disadvantage. In addition, newer AK-47-type rifles use a muzzle brake or compensator to reduce recoil. Some AK-type rifles also have vertical foregrips to improve handling characteristics and to counter the effects of recoil.

Free Recoil
	M16	AK-47
momentum	40.4 lb-fps	54.3 lb-fps
velocity	5.1 fps	5.2 fps
energy	3.2 ft-lbs	4.4 ft-lbs

Notes: Free Recoil is a mathematical equation calculated by using the rifle weight, bullet weight, muzzle velocity and charge weight. It is that which would be measured if the rifle were fired suspended from strings, free to recoil. As mentioned above, a rifle's perceived recoil is also dependent on many other factors which are not readily quantified.

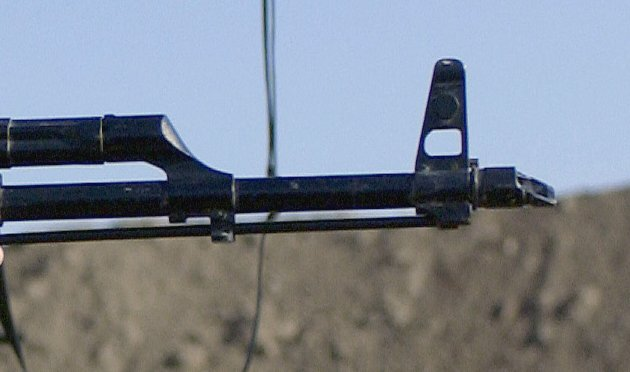
AKM slant-cut muzzle brake

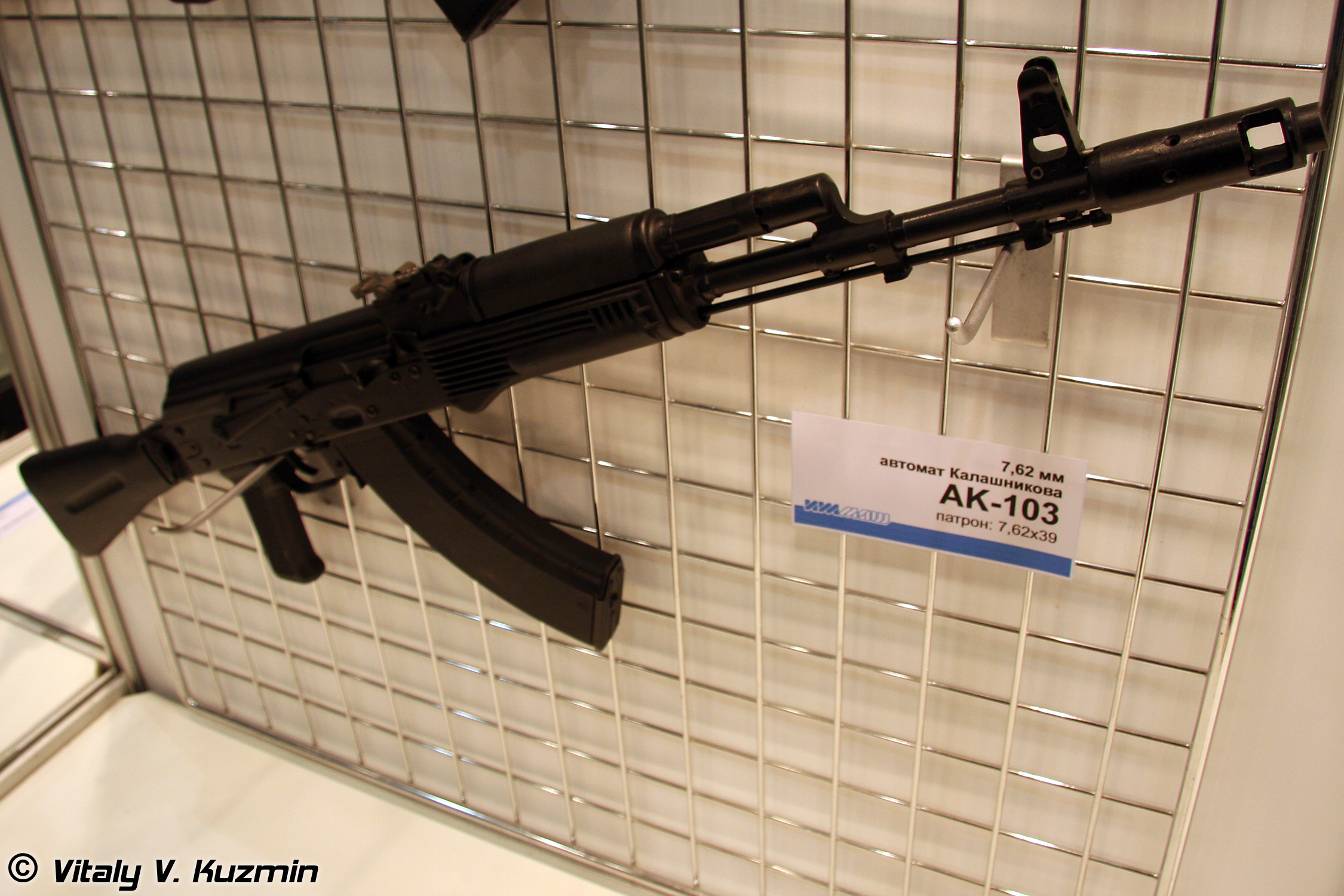
AK-103 compensator

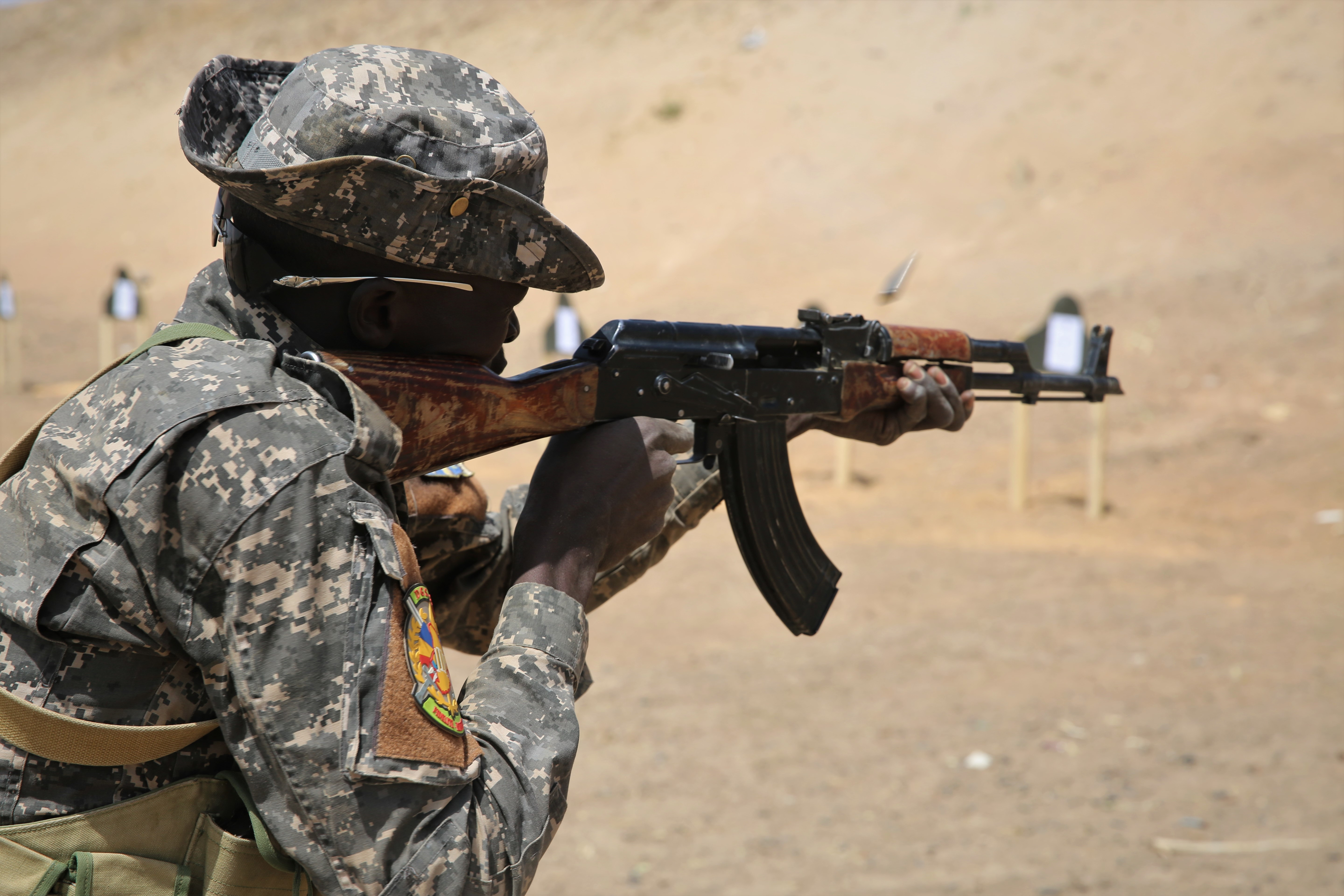
Firing an AKM

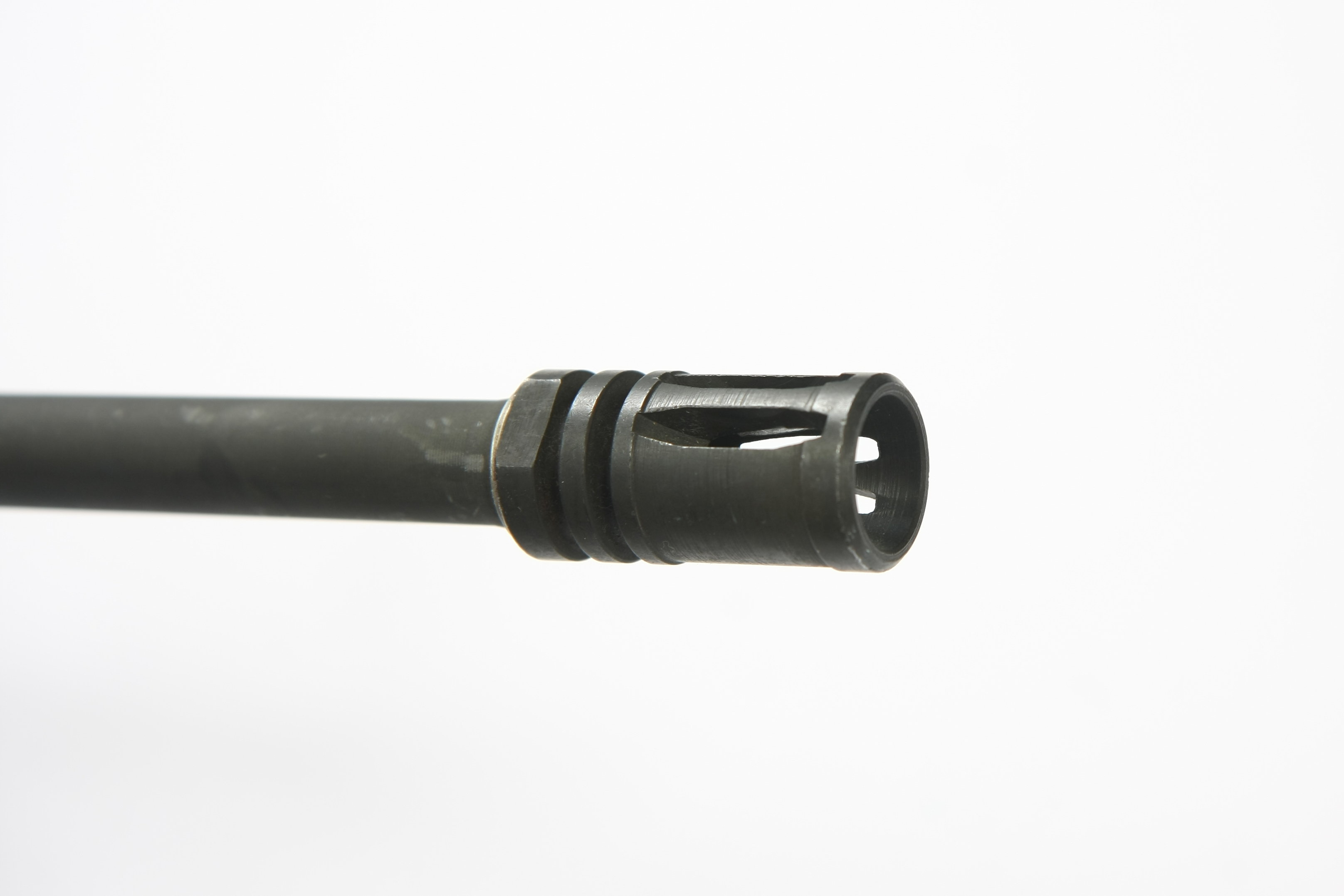
M16A2 flash-hider & compensator

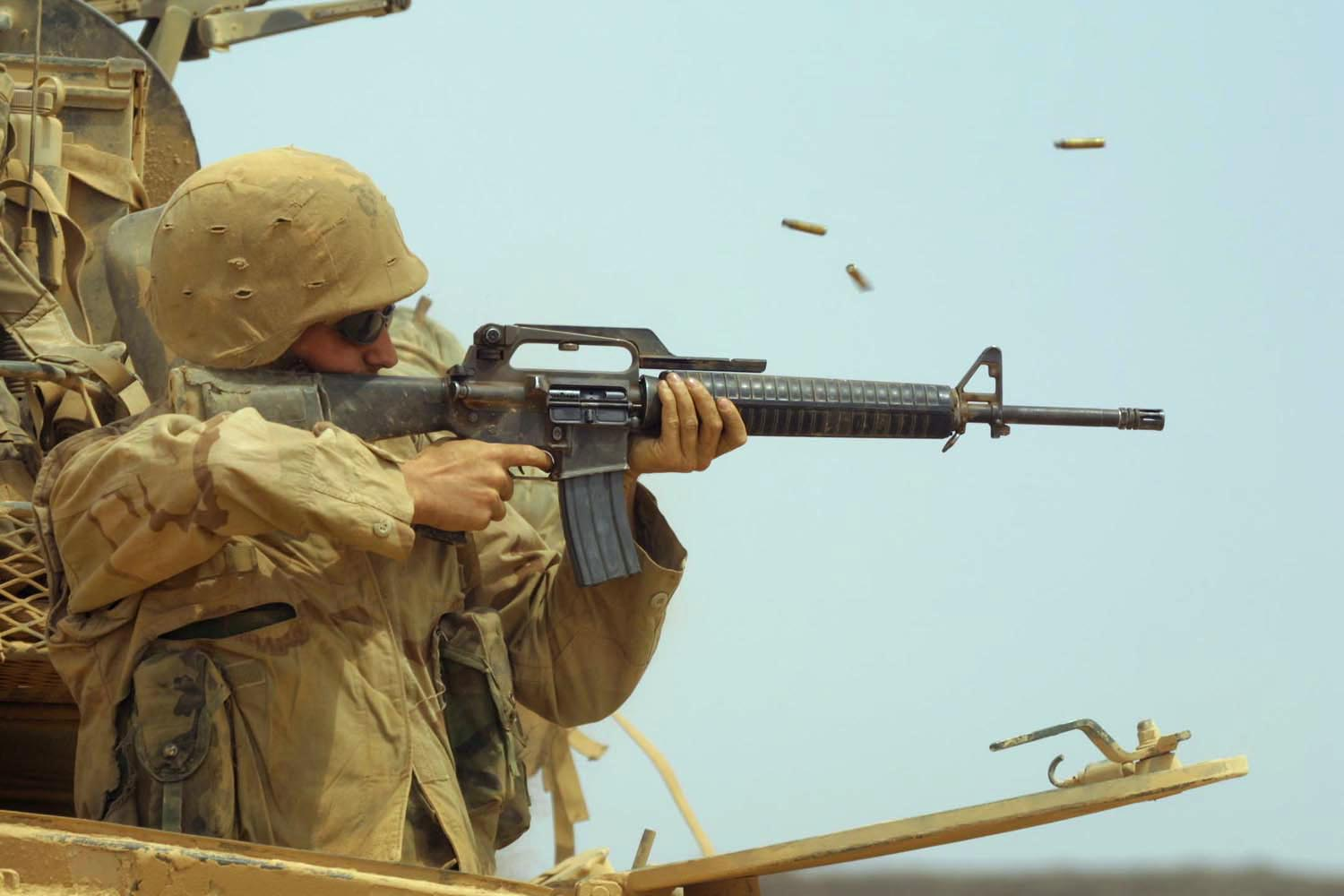
Firing M16A2 in three-round-burst

=== Sights ===
"A longer rifle barrel has the advantages of a longer sight radius, theoretically allowing a shooter to obtain a higher degree of accuracy from the improved precision of the sights alone. A longer barrel also provides a longer path for the projectile to stabilize before exiting the barrel, while allotting a longer period for the propellant charge to act on the projectile, often resulting in higher muzzle velocities and more consistent trajectories. A long barrel inherently provides more mass available for heat transfer, increasing the heat transfer rate incurred between shots, in turn allotting less warpage in the barrel, helping to improve consistency (and ultimately accuracy)."<

The M16 has a 50.8 cm (20.0 in) barrel and a 500mm (19.75 inches) sight radius. The M16 uses an L-type flip, aperture rear sight and it is adjustable with two settings, 0 to 300 meters, and 300 to 400 meters. The front sight is a post, adjustable for elevation in the field. The rear sight can be adjusted in the field for windage. The sights can be adjusted with a bullet tip and soldiers are trained to zero their rifles. The sight picture is the same as the M14, M1 Garand, M1 Carbine and the M1917 Enfield. The M16 also has a "Low Light Level Sight System", which includes a front sight post with a small glass vial of (glow-in-the-dark) radioactive Tritium H3 and a larger aperture rear sight. The M16 can mount a scope on the carrying handle. With the advent of the M16A2, a new fully adjustable rear sight was added, allowing the rear sight to be dialed in for specific range settings between 300 and 800 meters and to allow windage adjustments without the need for a tool or cartridge. Current issue M16A4s and M4s have detachable carrying handles and use Picatinny rails which allow for the use of various scopes and sighting devices. The current United States Army and Air Force issue M4 Carbine comes with the M68 Close Combat Optic and Back-up Iron Sight. The United States Marine Corps uses the ACOG Rifle Combat Optic and the United States Navy uses the EOTech Holographic Weapon Sight.

The AK-47 has a 41.5 cm (16.3 in) barrel and a 378mm (14.88 inches) sight radius. The AK-47 uses a notched rear tangent iron sight, it is adjustable and is calibrated in hundreds from 100 to 800 meters (100 to 1000 meters for AKM models). The front sight is a post adjustable for elevation in the field. Windage adjustment is done by the armory before issue. The "fixed" battle setting can be used for all ranges up to 300 meters. This "point-blank range" setting marked "П", allows the shooter to fire at close-range targets without adjusting the sights. Longer range settings are intended for area suppression. These settings mirror the Mosin–Nagant and SKS rifles which the AK-47 replaced. Some AK-type rifles have a front sight with a flip-up luminous dot that is calibrated at 50 meters, for improved night fighting. All current AK-47s (100 series), have a side rail for mounting a variety of scopes and sighting devices, such as the PSO-1 Optical Sniper Sight. However, their side folding stocks cannot be folded with the optics mounted. AK-47 side rail-mounted optics and rails have an advantage of holding point of impact zero, upon removal and installation, and are quick to detach if the operator needs to quickly use iron sights due to an optic malfunction. Additionally, many optics allow co-witness of the iron sights as well. As the mount is near the operator's firing hand, these mounts and optics do not upset the balance of the weapon.

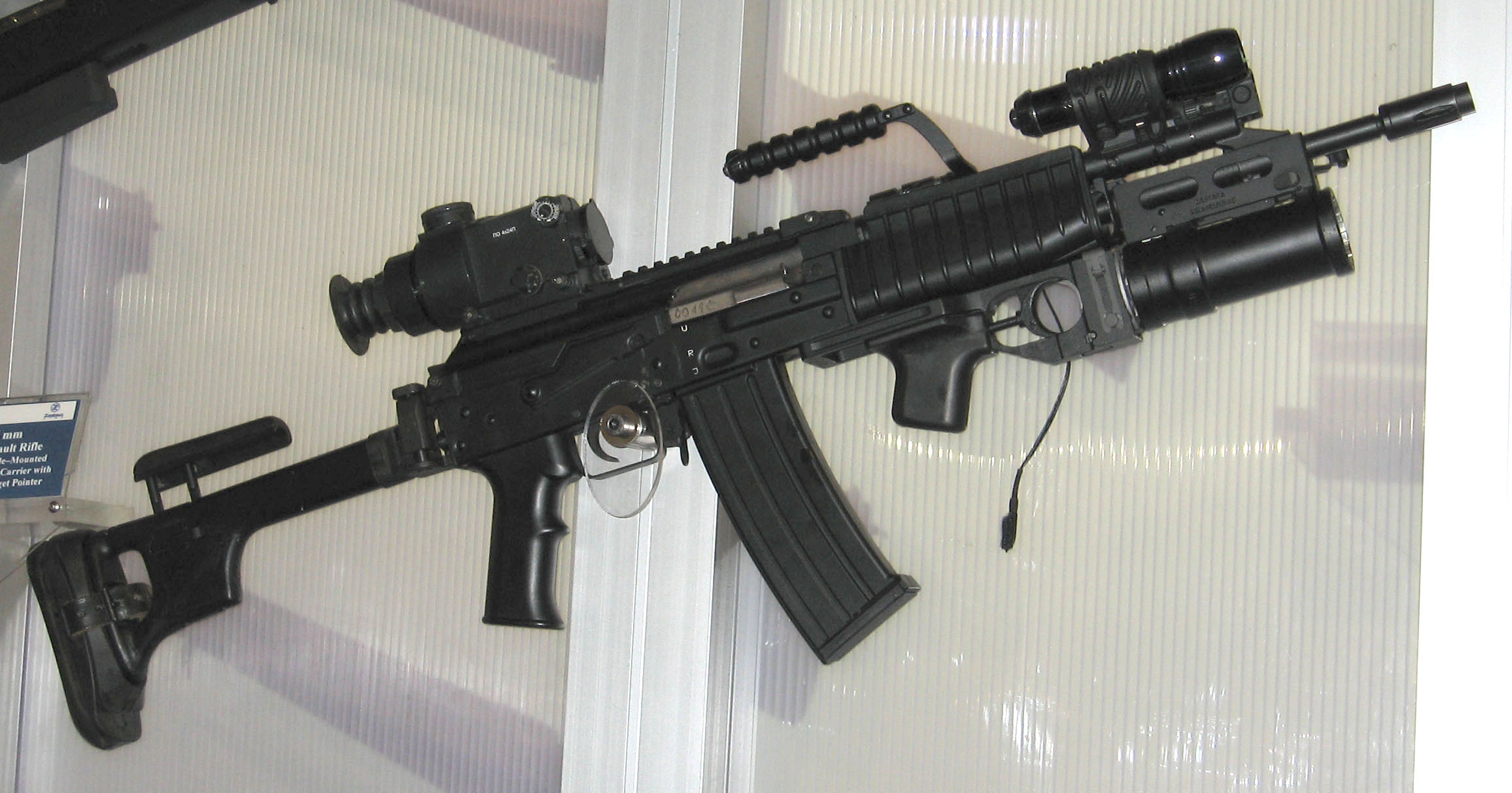
Serbian Zastava M21S (AK-47 variant) and GP-30. Note: sights on Picatinny rails

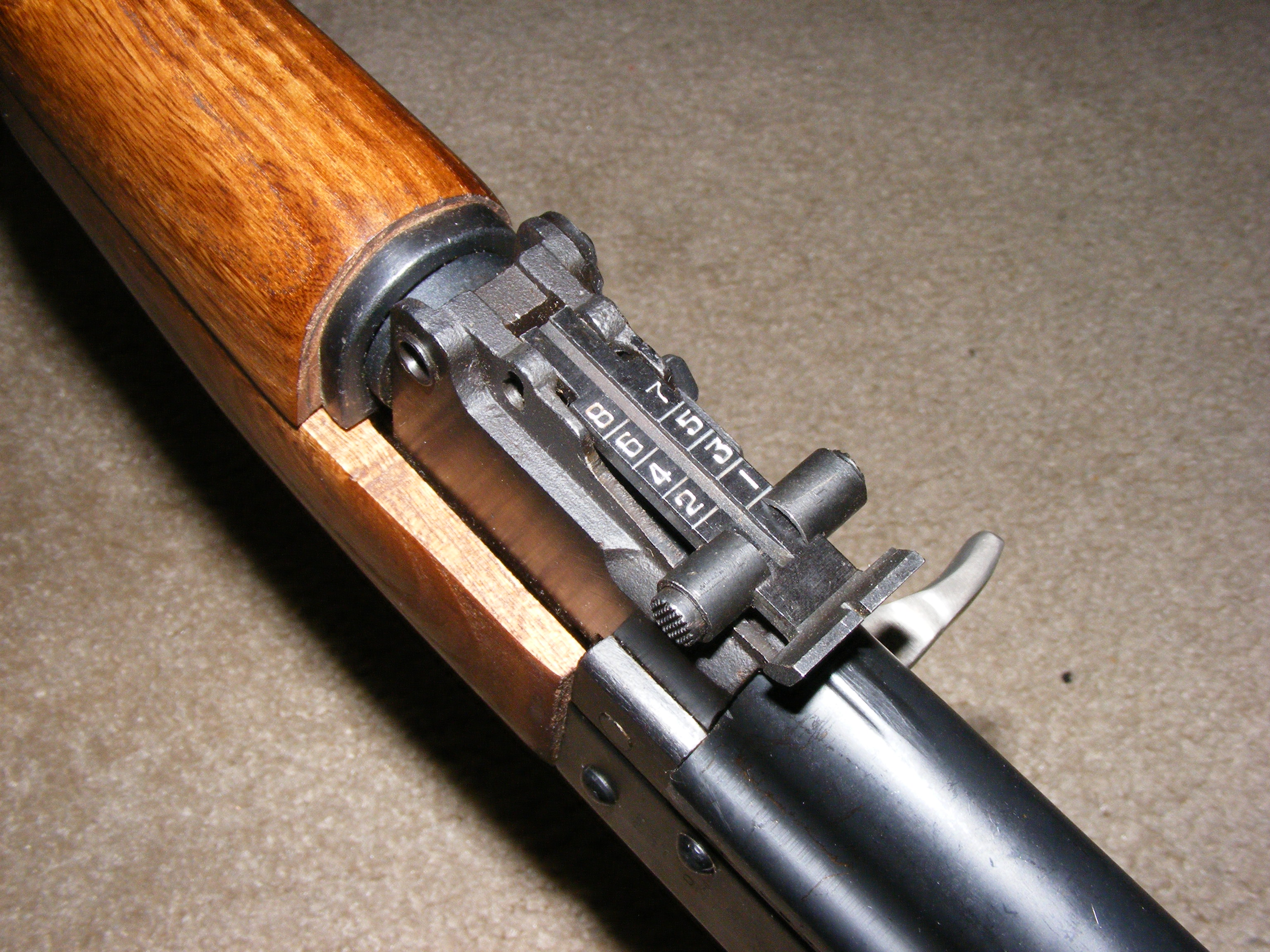
Rear sight of Chinese AK-47 type rifle. Note: 100–800 meter settings.

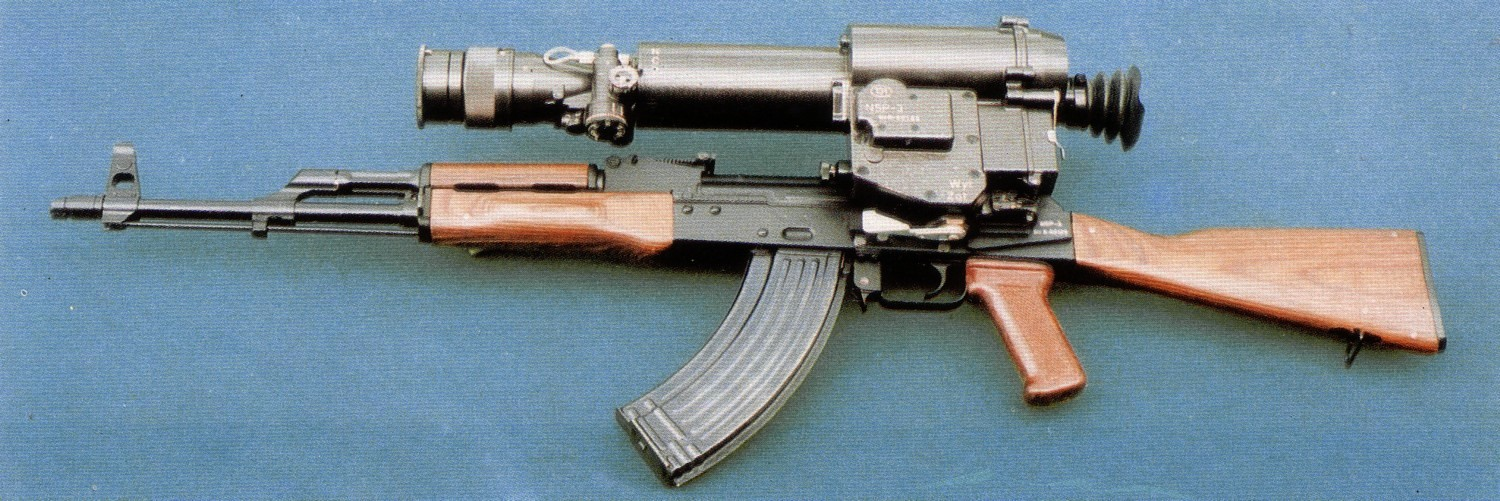
AKM with NSP-3 night sight mounted on side rail

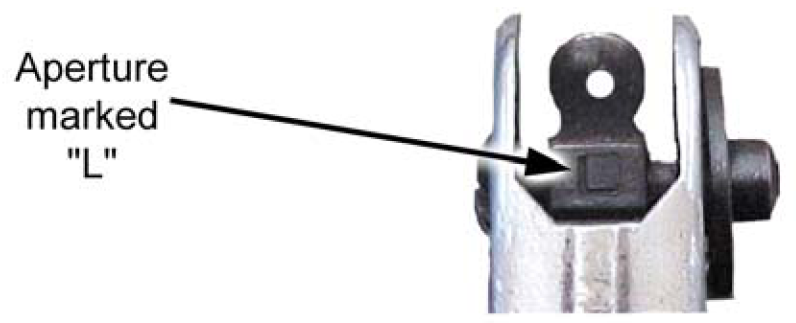
Rear sight of M16A1

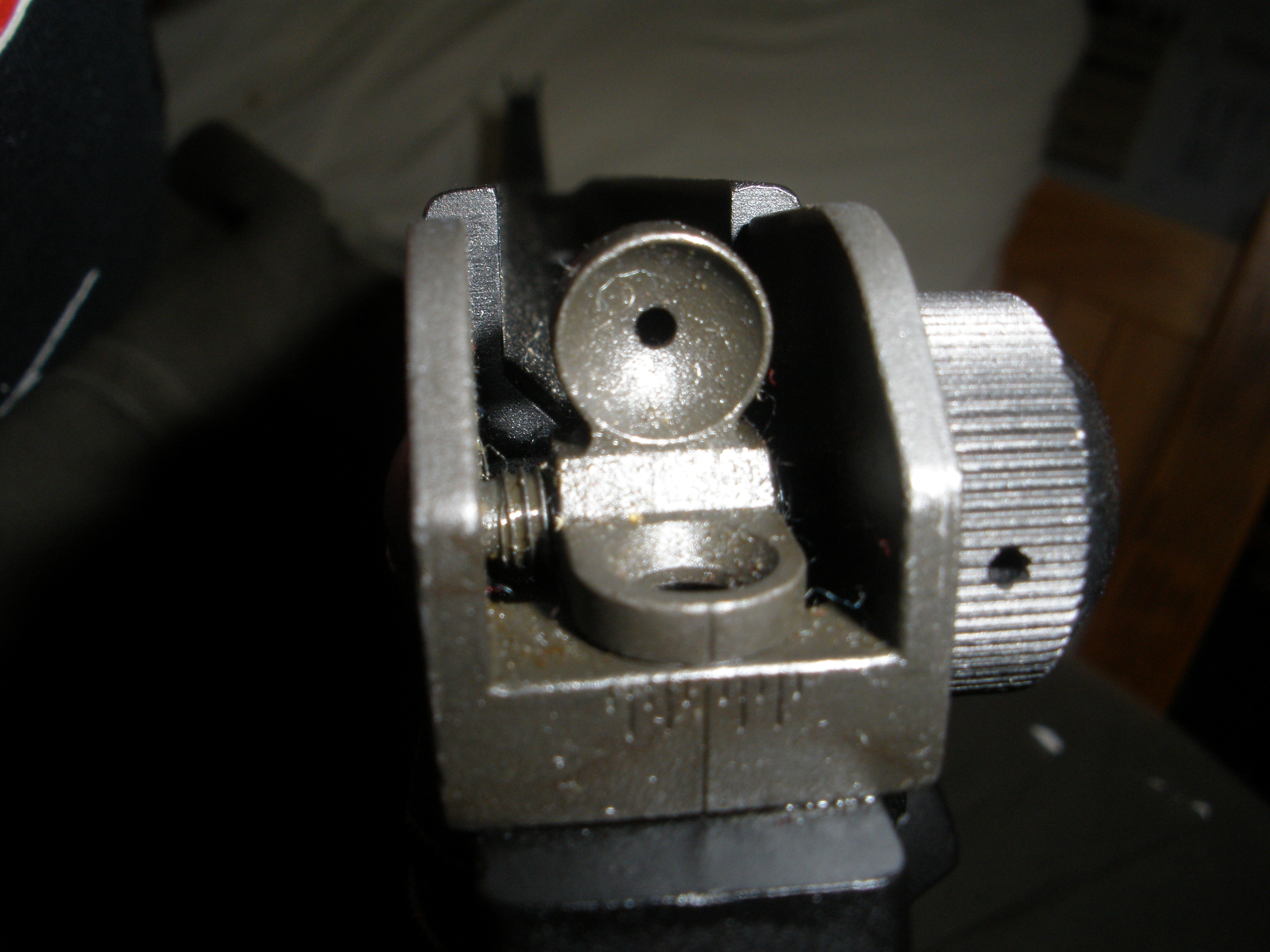
Rear sight of M16A2

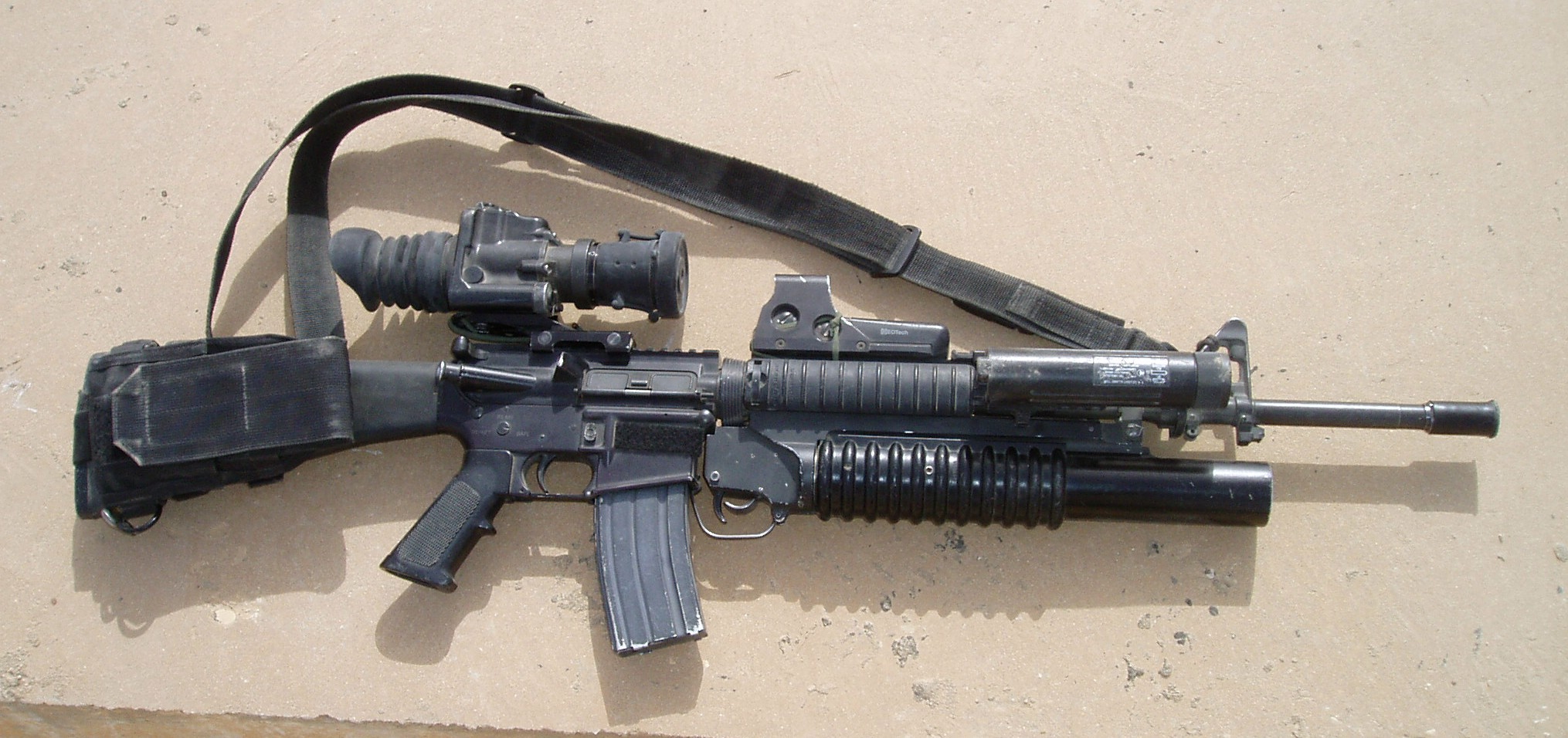
M16A4/M203 Note: sights on Picatinny rails

=== Range and accuracy ===
A brief comparison between cartridges reveals that the M16's lighter, higher-velocity 5.56×45mm cartridge has much better range and accuracy than the AK-47's heavier 7.62×39mm cartridge.

Rifle	Caliber	Cartridge	Cartridge weight	Bullet weight	Velocity	Energy	Range				Accuracy	
Rifle	Caliber	Cartridge	Cartridge weight	Bullet weight	Velocity	Energy	Effective*	Horizontal**	Lethal***	Maximum****	10 shot group @ 100 meters	10 shot group @ 300 meters
M16	5.56×45mm	M193	184 gr (11.9 g)	55 gr (3.6 g)	3,250 fps (990 m/s)	1,302 ft/lbs (1,764 J)	500 yds (460 m)	711 yds (650 m)	984 yds (900 m)	3000 yds (2700 m)	4.3 in (11 cm)	12.6 in (32 cm)
AK-47	7.62×39mm	M43	255 gr (16.5 g)	122 gr (7.9 g)	2,330 fps (710 m/s)	1,468 ft/lbs (1,991 J)	380 yds (350 m)	580 yds (530 m)	1640 yds (1500 m)	2500 yds (2300 m)	5.9 in (15 cm)	17.5 in (44 cm)

Note *: The effective range of a firearm is the maximum distance at which a weapon may be expected to be accurate and achieve the desired effect.
Note **: The horizontal range is the distance traveled by a bullet, fired from the rifle at a height of 1.6 meters and 0° elevation until the bullet hits the ground.
Note ***: The lethal range is the maximum range of a small-arms projectile, while still maintaining the minimum energy required to put a man out of action, which is generally believed to be 15 kilogram-meters (108 ft-lbs). This is the equivalent of the muzzle energy of a .22LR handgun.
Note ****: The maximum range of a small-arms projectile is attained at about 30° elevation. This maximum range is only of safety interest, not for combat firing.

The M16 rifle is "accurate beyond description". Its light recoil, high velocity, and flat trajectory allow shooters to take headshots out to 300 meters. Newer M16s use the newer M855 cartridge increasing their effective range to 600 meters. They are also more accurate than their predecessors and are capable of shooting 1–3 inch groups at 100 yards. "In Fallujah, Marines with ACOG-equipped M16A4s created a stir by taking so many headshots that until the wounds were closely examined, some observers thought the insurgents had been executed." The newest M855A1 EPR cartridge is even more accurate and during testing "...has shown that, on average, 95 percent of the rounds will hit within an 8 × 8-inch target at 600 meters."

The AK-47's accuracy has always been considered to be "good enough" to hit an adult male torso out to about 300 meters. "At 300 meters, expert shooters (firing AK-47s) at prone or at bench rest positions had difficulty putting ten consecutive rounds on target." Despite the Soviet engineers' best efforts and "no matter the changes, the AK-47's accuracy could not be significantly improved; when it came to precise shooting, it was a stubbornly mediocre arm." Curiously, the newer stamped steel receiver AKM models are less accurate than their predecessors. "There are advantages and disadvantages in both forged/milled receivers and stamped receivers. Milled/Forged Receivers are much more rigid, flexing less as the rifle is fired thus not hindering accuracy as much as stamped receivers. Stamped receivers on the other hand are a bit more rugged since it has some give in them and have less chance of having metal fatigue under heavy usage." As a result, the milled AK-47s are capable of shooting 3–5 inch groups at 100 yards, whereas the stamped AKMs are capable of shooting 4–6 inch groups at 100 yards. The best shooters can hit a man-sized target at 800 meters within five shots (firing from a prone or supported position) or ten shots (standing).

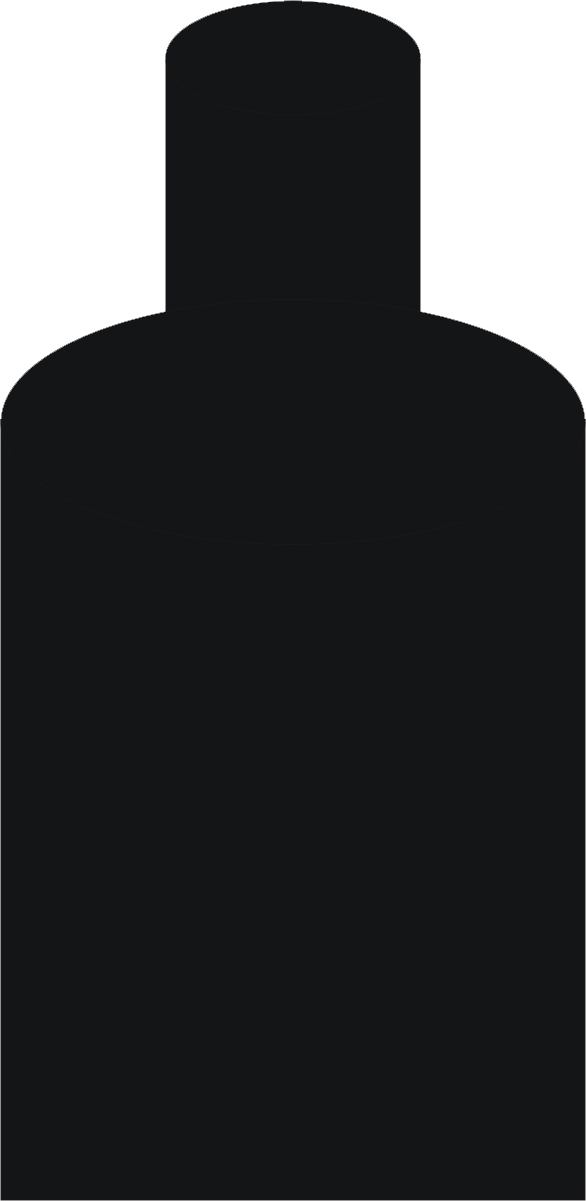
NATO E-type Silhouette Target

Single-shot hit-probability on Crouching Man (E-Silhouette) Target
Rifle	Caliber	Hit-probability (With no range estimation or aiming errors)								
Rifle	Caliber	50 meters	100 meters	200 meters	300 meters	400 meters	500 meters	600 meters	700 meters	800 meters
M16A1	5.56×45mm	100%	100%	100%	100%	96%	87%	73%	56%	39%
AK-47	7.62×39mm	100%	100%	99%	94%	82%	67%	54%	42%	31%

=== Terminal ballistics ===
A brief comparison between cartridges reveals that the AK-47's heavier 7.62×39mm cartridge has much better penetration than the M16's lighter, higher-velocity 5.56×45mm cartridge. However, it also reveals that the M16's lighter, higher-velocity 5.56mm bullet tends to fragment on impact causing larger wounds than the AK-47's heavier 7.62mm bullet, which does not fragment on impact.

Rifle	Caliber	Cartridge	Penetration						
Rifle	Caliber	Cartridge	Ballistic gelatin @ 10 meters	Sandbags @ 100 meters	3/4" pine boards @ 100 meters	Concrete building block (one center rib)	Steel helmet	1.9mm steel (14 gauge) @ 100 meters	4mm steel (8 gauge) + layers of Kevlar-29
AK-47	7.62×39mm	M43	≈29 in (74 cm) (bullet did not fragment)	13 in (33 cm) (bullet did not fragment)	19 boards (bullet did not tumble)	both sides to 200 m one side to 400 m	both sides to 200 m one side to 400 m	3 layers	33 layers of Kevlar
M16	5.56×45mm	M193	≈14 in (36 cm) (bullet fragments into smaller pieces)	4 in (10 cm) (complete bullet disintegration)	8 boards (bullet tumbled)	one side to 200 m	both sides to 300 m one side to 500 m	2 layers	31 layers of Kevlar

Wound profiles in ballistic gelatin
Note: images are not to same scale

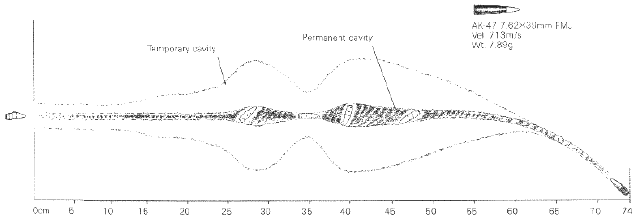
AK-47 7.62×39mm

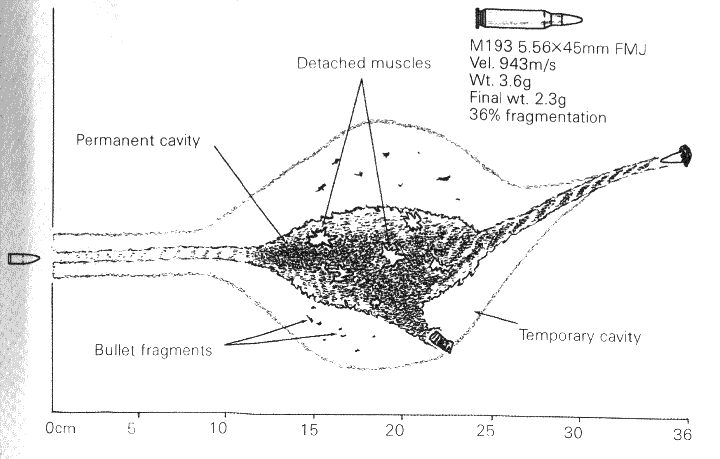
M16 5.56×45mm

The AK-47's heavier 7.62×39mm round has superior penetration when compared to the M16's lighter 5.56×45mm round and is better in circumstances where a soldier has to shoot through heavy foliage, walls or a common vehicle's metal body and into an opponent attempting to use these things as cover. The 7.62×39mm M43 projectile does not generally fragment in soft tissue and has an unusual tendency to remain intact even after making contact with bone. The 7.62×39mm round produces significant wounding in cases where the bullet tumbles in tissue, but produces relatively minor wounds in cases where the bullet exits before beginning to yaw. In the absence of yaw, the M43 round can pencil through tissue with relatively little injury and its wounding potential is limited to the small permanent wound channel the bullet itself makes.

The original ammunition for the M16 was the 5.56×45mm M193 round. When fired from a 20" barrel at ranges of up to 100 meters, the thin-jacketed lead-cored round traveled fast enough (above 2900 ft/s) that the force of striking a human body would cause the round to yaw (or tumble) and fragment into about a dozen pieces of various sizes thus created wounds that were out of proportion to its caliber. These wounds were much larger than those produced by AK-47 and they were so devastating that many considered the M16 to be an inhumane weapon As the 5.56mm round's velocity decreases, so does the number of fragments that it produces. The 5.56mm round does not normally fragment at distances beyond 200 meters or at velocities below 2500 ft/s, and its lethality becomes largely dependent on shot placement.

In March 1970, the U.S. recommended that all NATO forces adopt the 5.56×45mm cartridge. This shift represented a change in the philosophy of the military's long-held position about caliber size. By the mid-1970s, other armies were looking at M16-style weapons. A NATO standardization effort soon started and tests of various rounds were carried out starting in 1977. The U.S. offered the 5.56×45mm M193 round, but there were concerns about its penetration in the face of the wider introduction of body armor. In the end the Belgian 5.56×45mm SS109 round was chosen (STANAG 4172) in October 1980. The SS109 round was based on the U.S. cartridge but included a new stronger, heavier, 62-grain bullet design, with better long-range performance and improved penetration (specifically, to consistently penetrate the side of a steel helmet at 600 meters). Due to its design and lower muzzle velocity (about 3110 ft/s) the Belgian SS109 round is considered more humane because it is less likely to fragment than the U.S. M193 round. The NATO 5.56×45mm standard ammunition produced for U.S. forces is designated M855.

Most, if not all, of the 7.62×39mm ammunition found today is of the upgraded M67 variety. This variety deleted the steel insert, shifting the center of gravity rearward and allowing the projectile to destabilize (or yaw) at about 3.3 in (8.4 cm), nearly 6.7 in (17 cm) earlier in tissue than the M43 round. This change also reduces penetration in ballistic gelatin to ≈25 in (64 cm) for the newer M67 round versus ≈29 in (74 cm) for the older M43 round. However, like the M43, the wounding potential of M67 is mostly limited to the small permanent wound channel the bullet itself makes, especially when the bullet doesn't yaw (tumble).

There is now relative parity between the wounding capacity of the M67 and the current M855 5.56×45mm round. However, there have been repeated and consistent reports of the M855's inability to wound effectively (i.e. fragment) when fired from the short-barreled M4 carbine (even at close ranges). The M4's 14.5" barrel length reduces muzzle velocity to about 2900 ft/s. This reduced wounding ability is one reason that, despite the Army's transition to short-barrel M4s, the Marine Corps has decided to continue using the M16A4 with its 20″ barrel as the 5.56×45mm M855 is largely dependent upon high velocity to wound effectively.

In 2003, the U.S. Army contended that the lack of lethality of the 5.56×45mm was more a matter of perception than fact. With good shot placement to the head and chest, the target was usually defeated without issue. The majority of failures were the result of hitting the target in non-vital areas such as extremities. However, a minority of failures occurred despite multiple hits to the chest. In 2006, a study found that 20% of soldiers using the M4 Carbine wanted more lethality or stopping power. In June 2010, the United States Army announced it began shipping its new 5.56mm, lead-free, M855A1 Enhanced Performance Round to active combat zones. This upgrade is designed to maximize the performance of the 5.56×45mm round, extend range, improve accuracy, increase penetration, and consistently fragment in soft-tissue when fired from not only standard-length M16s but also the short-barreled M4 carbines.

During the 1990s, the Russians developed the AK-101 in 5.56×45mm NATO for the world export market. In addition, Bulgaria, Hungary, Poland, and Yugoslavia (i.e. Serbia) have also rechambered their locally produced AK variants to 5.56mm NATO. And, Finland, Israel, South Africa, and Sweden have made AK-type rifles in 5.56×45mm since the 1970s.

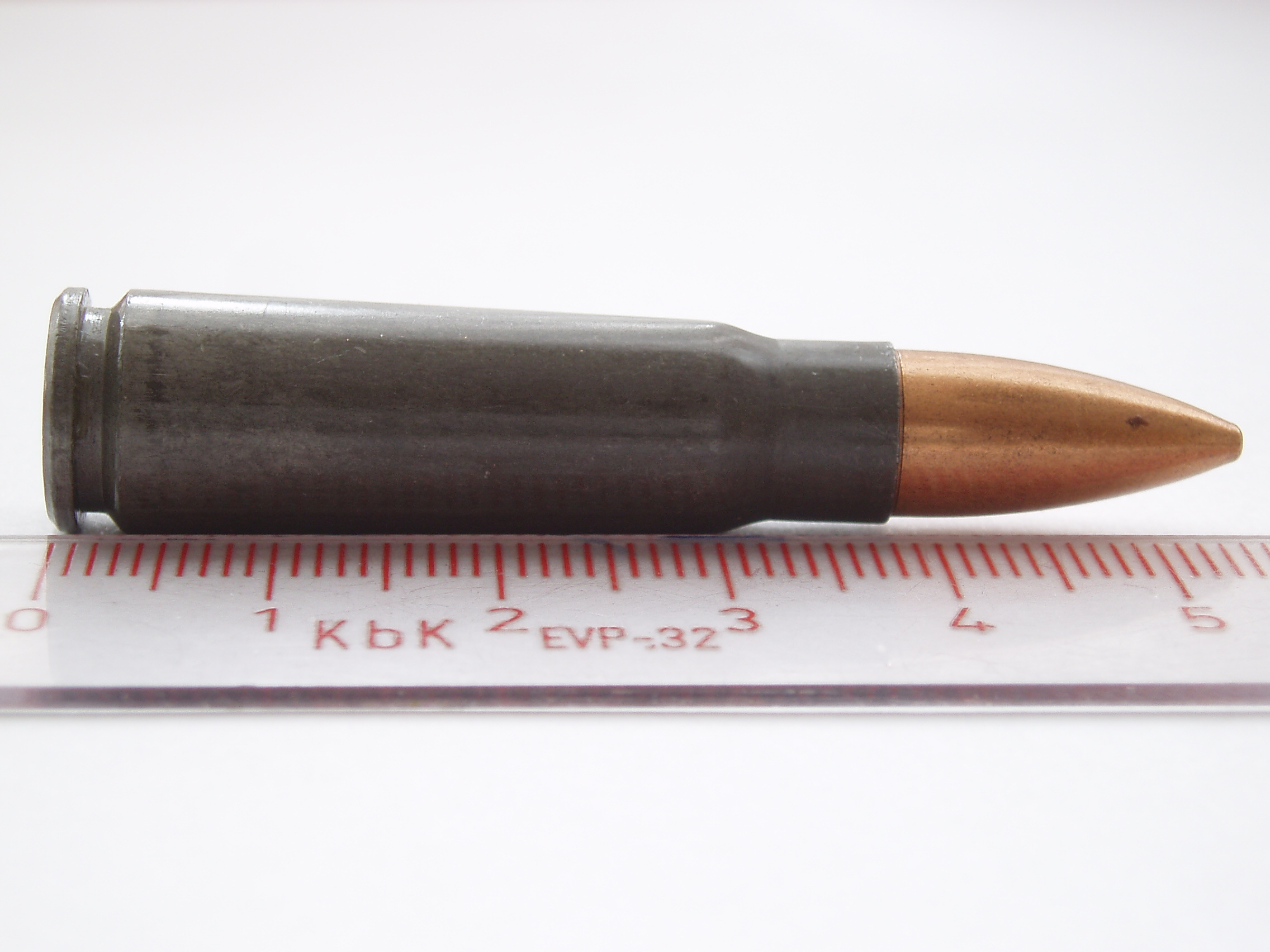
Russian steel-case 7.62×39mm cartridge

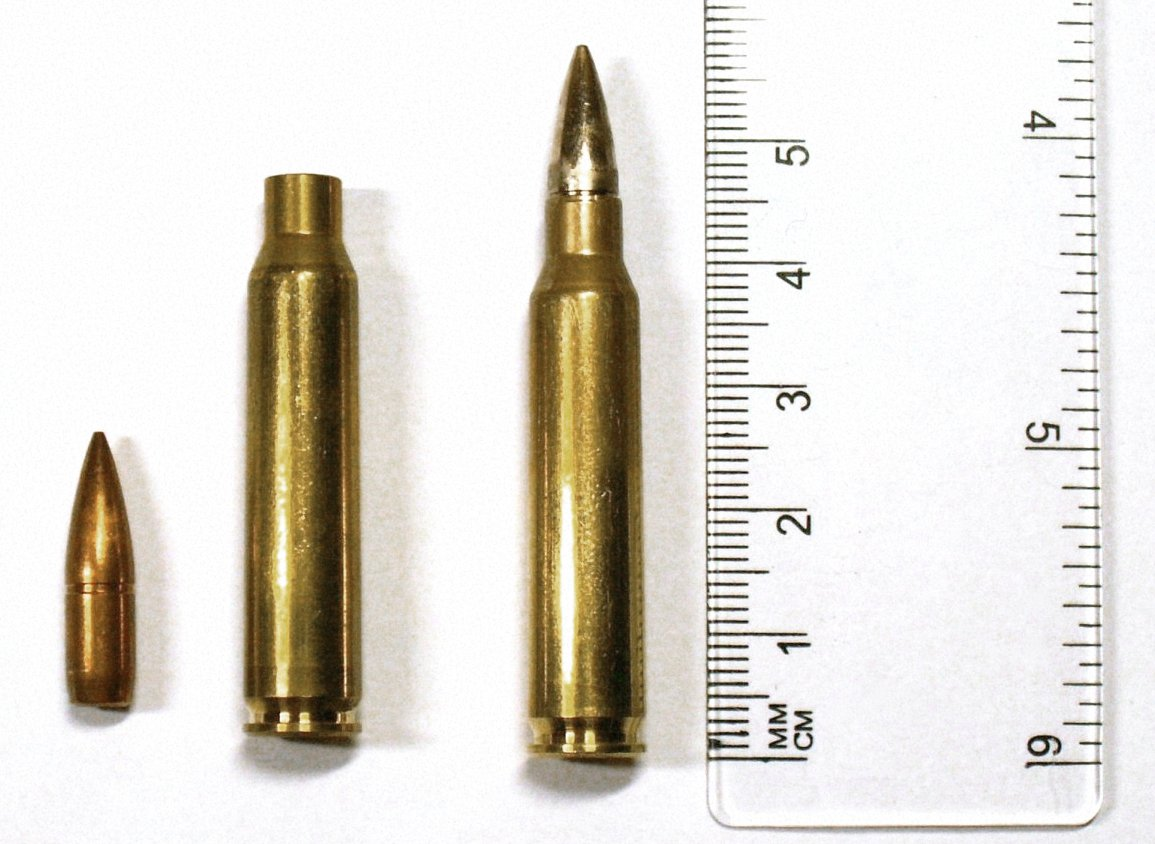
5.56×45mm cartridge

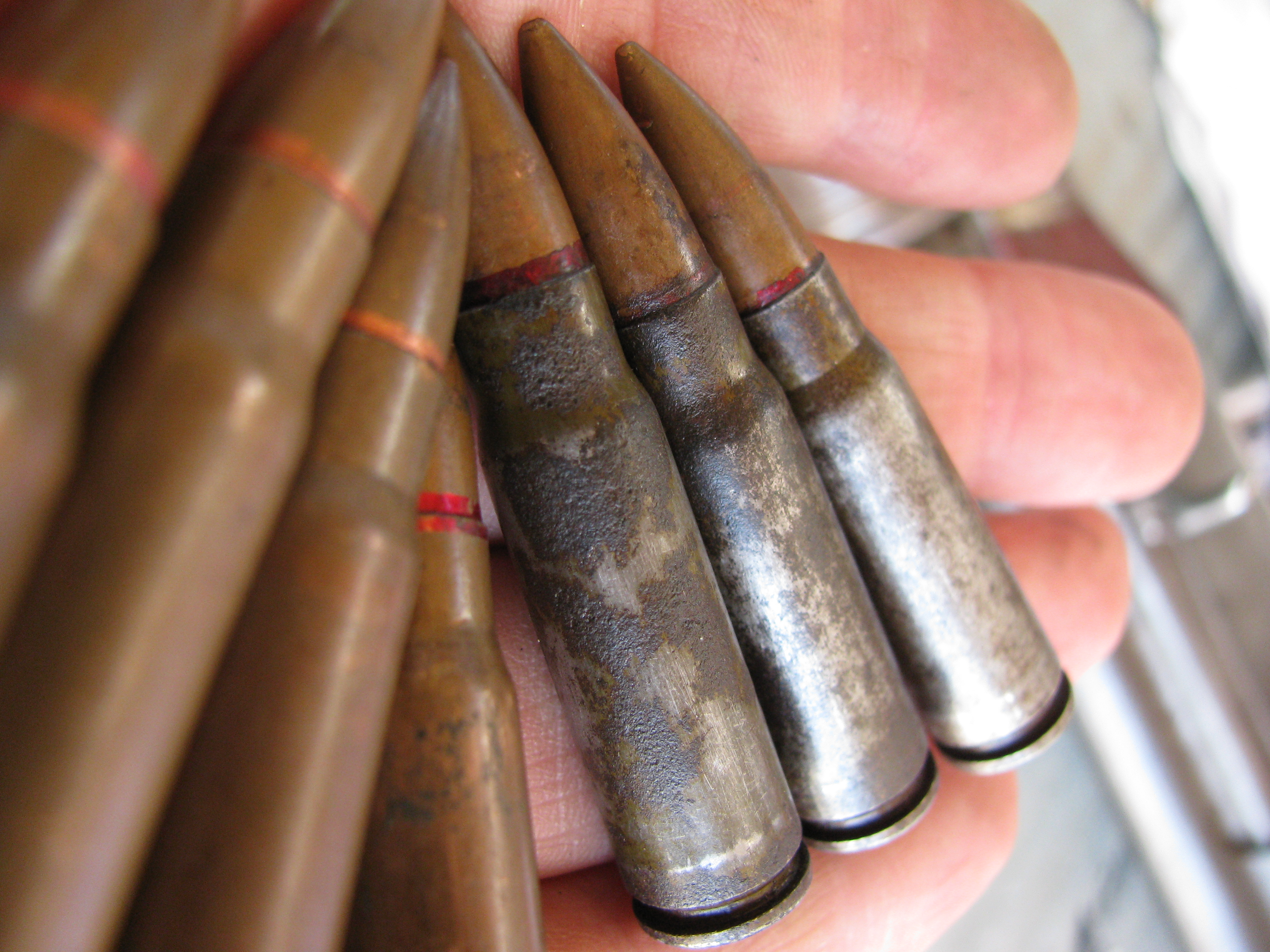
Handful of various types of 7.62×39mm cartridges

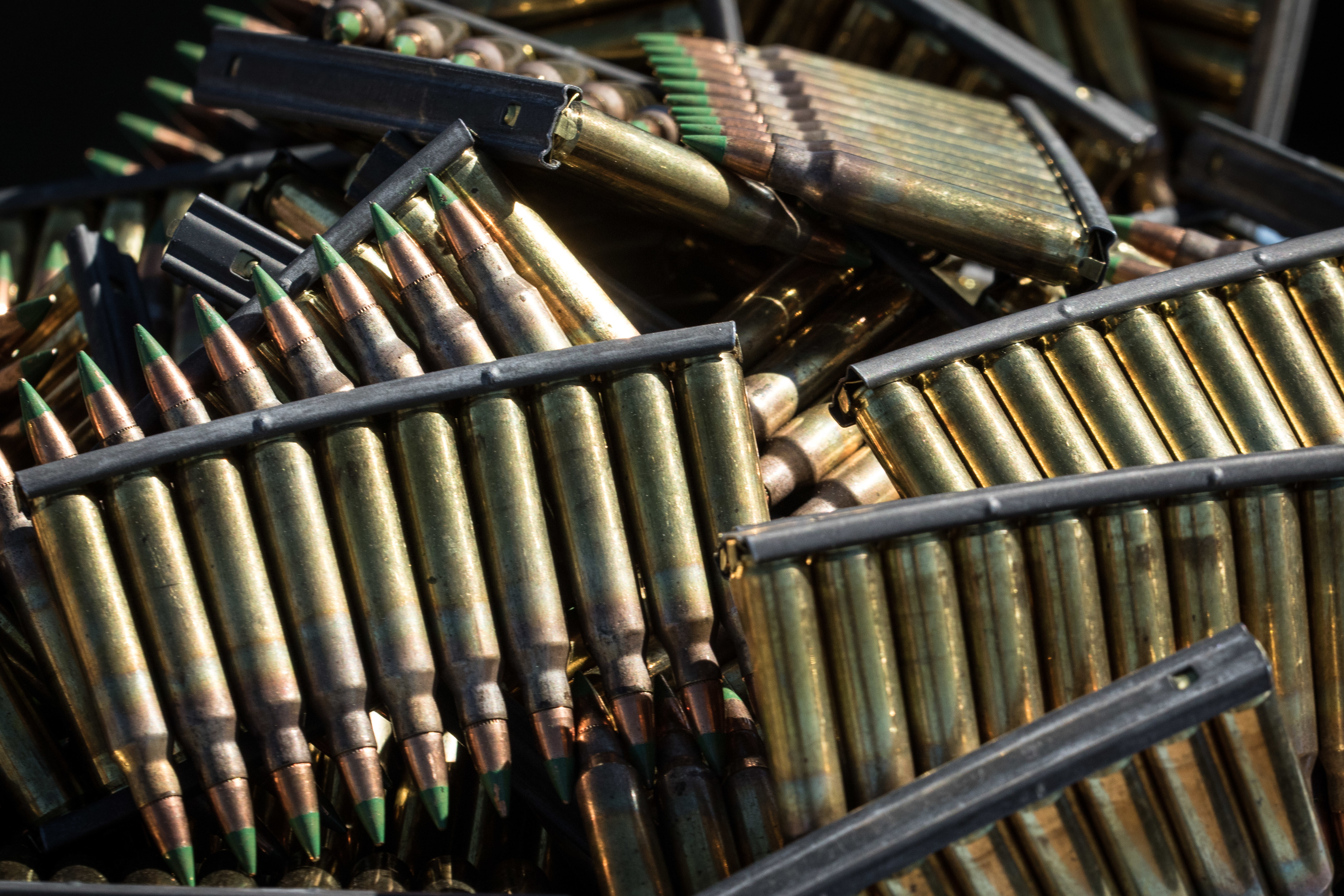
5.56×45mm M855 ammo on 10-round stripper clips

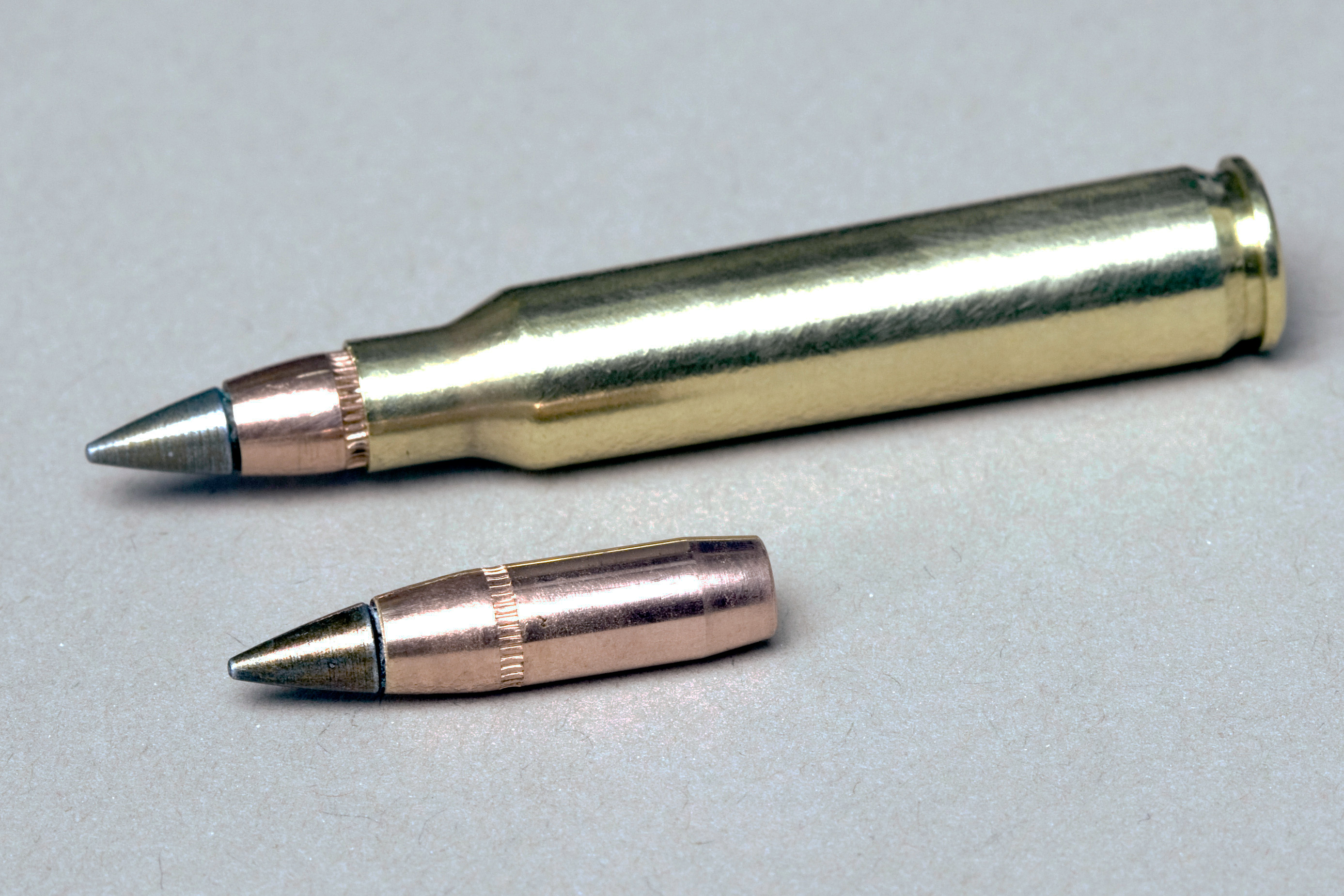
5.56mm M855A1 Enhanced Performance Round and its environmentally friendly projectile

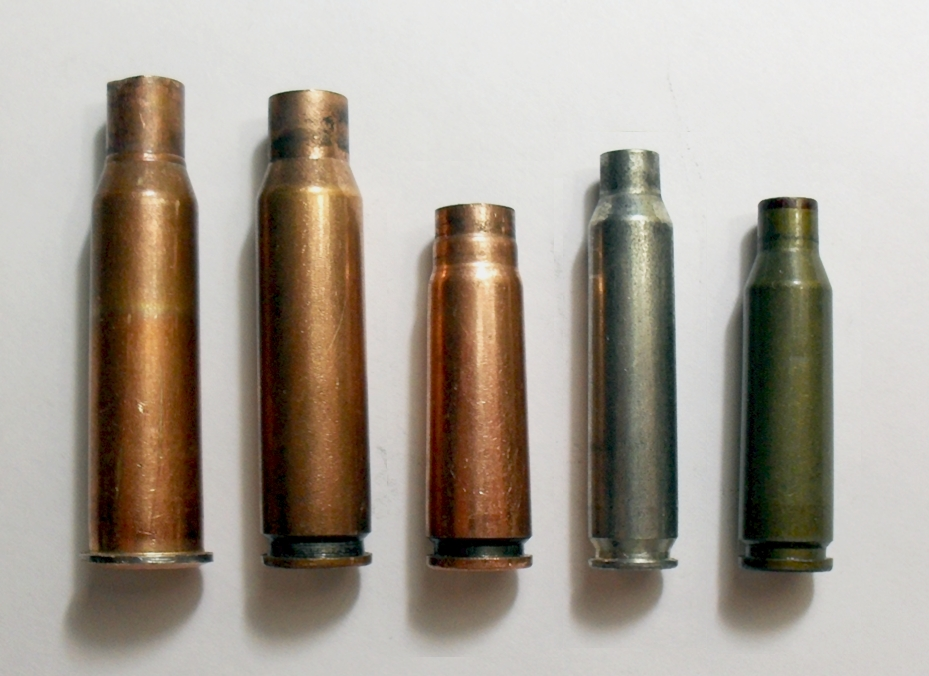
Modern service rifle cartridges cases: (left to right) 7.62×54mmR, 7.62×51mm NATO, 7.62×39mm M43, 5.56×45mm NATO, 5.45×39mm M74.

=== Firepower ===
Rates of fire

Both the AK-47 and the M16 are select-fire weapons capable of firing in semi-automatic and full-auto, or semi-auto and 3-round-burst for the later model M16s. However, the semi-auto and 3-round-burst capabilities of the M16A2 and M4 models have less combat capability than their predecessors or AK-47-type rifles. This is due to the elimination of the full-auto mode of fire In addition, the burst mechanism does not recycle; if one or two rounds are fired because the trigger is not held long enough, the next pull of the trigger will not result in a three-round burst but will result in two or one-shots being fired, respectively. The M4A1 and HK416 have abandoned the 3-round-burst capability and returned to the more traditional semi-automatic and full-auto modes of fire, while the M16A4 retains the 3-round burst mode.

Rifle	Rate of fire				
Rifle	Full-auto cyclical	Full-auto practical	3-round-burst practical *	Semi-auto practical	Sustained **
AK-47	600 rpm	100 rpm	NA	40 rpm	12 to 15 rpm
M16	700–950 rpm	150 rpm	90 rpm	45 rpm	12 to 15 rpm

Note *: The AK-47 does not have a three-round burst capability. The M16A2 and M4 models have replaced the full-auto mode of fire with a three-round burst capability.
Note **: Both the AK-47 and the M16 will overheat fairly quickly under normal combat conditions and have a sustained rate of fire as low as 12 to 15 rounds per minute (about the same as a bolt-action rifle).

Available firepower

The standard magazine capacity for both the AK-47 and M16 type rifles is 30 rounds, although lower and higher capacity magazines are available for both systems. However, the single most limiting factor in terms of firepower is the amount of ammunition that a soldier can carry. A soldier armed with an M16 can carry far more ammo than a soldier armed with an AK-47. Assuming a maximum 10-kilogram ammo load...

Magazine	Weight of loaded magazine	Magazine capacity	Max. 10.1 kg (22 lb) ammunition load *	Total available firepower
AK-47 slab-sided steel magazine	0.916 kg (2.02 lb)	30 rounds	10 magazines @ 9.61 kg (21.2 lb)	300 rounds
AKM ribbed stamped-steel magazine	0.819 kg (1.81 lb)	30 rounds	12 magazines @ 9.83 kg (21.7 lb)	360 rounds
AK-103 steel-reinforced plastic magazine	0.739 kg (1.63 lb)	30 rounds	13 magazines @ 9.61 kg (21.2 lb)	390 rounds
M16 aluminum 20-round magazine	0.320 kg (0.71 lb)	20 rounds	31 magazines @ 9.92 kg (21.9 lb)	620 rounds
M16 aluminum 30-round magazine	0.490 kg (1.08 lb)	30 rounds	20 magazines @ 9.80 kg (21.6 lb)	600 rounds

Note *: 10 kg (22 lb) is the maximum amount of ammo that the average soldier can comfortably carry. It also allows the best comparison of the three most common AK-47 magazines to the standard USGI M16 magazine.

Additional firepower

Additional firepower
M16	AK-47
All current M16 type rifles are capable of launching NATO STANAG type 22mm rifle grenades from their integral flash hiders without the use of an adapter. These 22mm rifle grenade types range from powerful anti-tank rounds to simple finned tubes with a fragmentation hand grenade attached to the end. The "standard" type rifle grenade is propelled by a blank cartridge inserted into the chamber of the rifle. The "bullet trap" and "shoot through" types, as their names imply use live ammunition. The U.S. military does not generally use rifle grenades, (Note: A variant of the SIMON breach grenade is in service with the U.S. Army as the M100 Grenade Rifle Entry Munition (GREM). Changes from the original specification involved fuzing and reliability issues. An inert round, the M101 GREM-Target Practice (GREM-TP) allows training for accuracy without the explosive hazard. The system was given a U.S. Army award as one of the top ten best inventions of 2005.) however they are used by other nations.	Some AK-47 type rifles like the Zastava M70's are also capable of launching 22mm rifle-grenades and have a grenade-launching ladder-type sight and gas cut-off, attached to the front end of the gas cylinder and coupled to the gas regulator. To launch rifle-grenades a 22mm adapter is screwed on in place of the slant brake or other muzzle device.
All M16 type rifles can mount a cup-type launcher used to launch the "400" or "Skittering" Tear-Gas Grenade.	All AK-47 type rifles can mount a (rarely used) cup-type grenade-launcher that fires standard RGD-5 Soviet hand-grenades. The soup-can shaped launcher is screwed onto the AK-47's muzzle. To fire first, insert a standard RGD-5 hand-grenade into the launcher and then remove the safety pin. Second, insert a special blank cartridge into the rifles chamber. Third, place the butt-stock of the rifle on the ground and fire from this position. The maximum effective range is approximately 150 meters. This cup-type launcher can also be used to launch tear-gas grenades.
All current M16 type rifles can mount under-barrel grenade-launchers such as the M203 and M320	All current AK-47 type rifles can mount under-barrel grenade-launchers such as the GP-25 series
All current M16 type rifles can mount under-barrel 12 gauge shotguns such as KAC Masterkey or the M26 Modular Accessory Shotgun System	
The M16 can mount the M234 Riot Control Launcher, which uses blank cartridges to launch either the M734 64 mm Kinetic Riot Control or the M742 64 mm CSI Riot Control Ring Airfoil Projectiles. The latter produces a 4 to 5 foot Tear Gas cloud on impact. The M234 is no longer used by United States forces. It has been replaced by the M203 40mm grenade launcher and nonlethal ammunition.	
The M16 can mount the Rifleman's Assault Weapon (also called RAW). This close-support, 140 mm spherical rocket-propelled grenade was developed around 1977 and put into limited service by the United States Marine Corps in the 1990s. The RAW's 1-kg high explosive squash head (HESH) warhead can penetrate 20 cm of reinforced concrete (creating a 36 cm-wide hole) and hit moving targets at a range of 300 meters. The RAW is no longer used by the USMC. It has been replaced by the Shoulder-launched Multipurpose Assault Weapon (also called SMAW).	

Note: All of these grenades, launchers, and shotguns add additional bulk and weight to the soldier's war load and as a result, they reduce the amount of rifle ammunition that soldiers can carry. For example, a modern French AC58 "bullet trap" rifle grenade is 380mm long and weighs 0.5 kg (1.1 lb), the equivalent of a loaded M16 magazine. An M203 grenade launcher adds 1.4 kg (3 lb) to an M16's weight and 40×46mm High Explosive (HE) grenades weigh 0.24 kg (0.53 lb), about half the weight of a loaded M16 magazine.

Video of U.S. troops using GREM (Simon) rifle grenade system

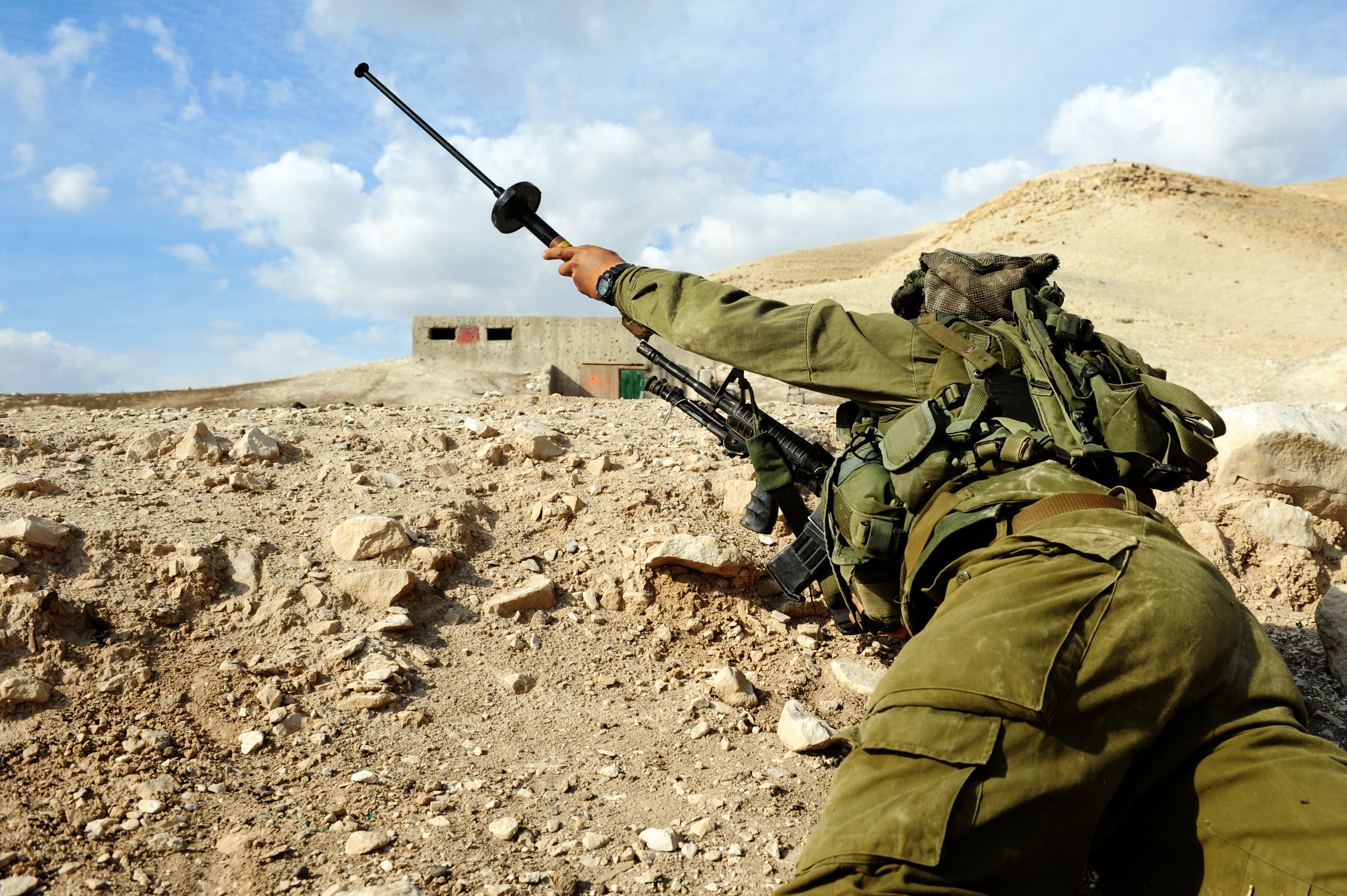
Israeli paratrooper prepares to launch Simon rifle grenade from M4 Carbine

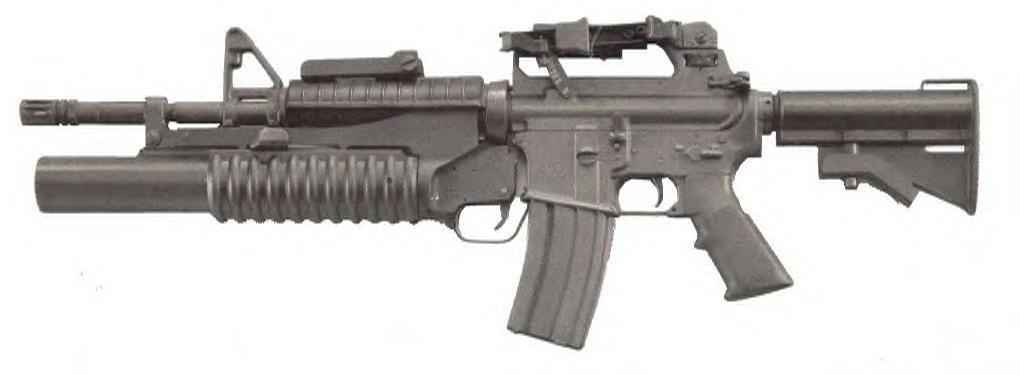
M203 attached to an M4 Carbine

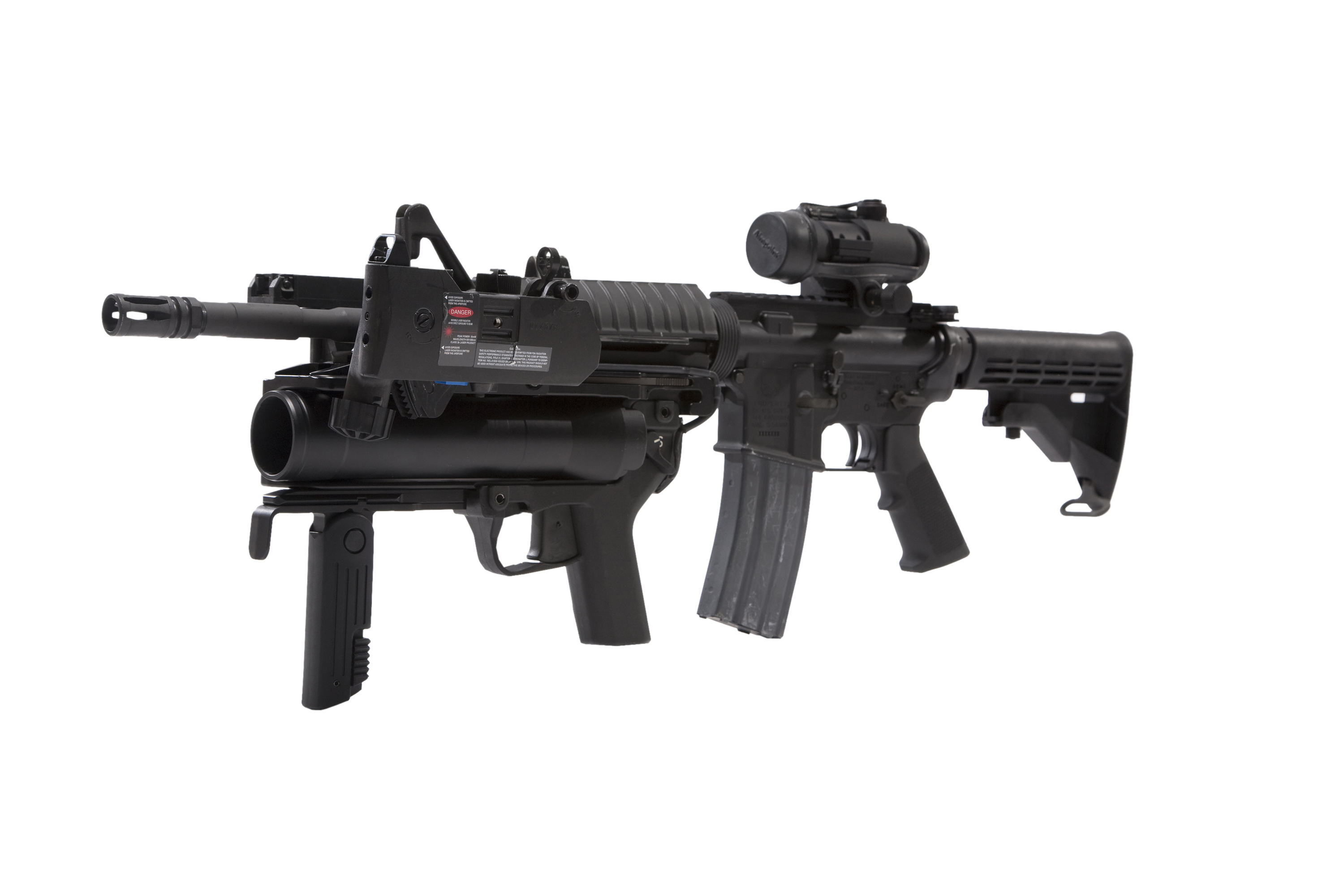
M320 attached to an M4 carbine

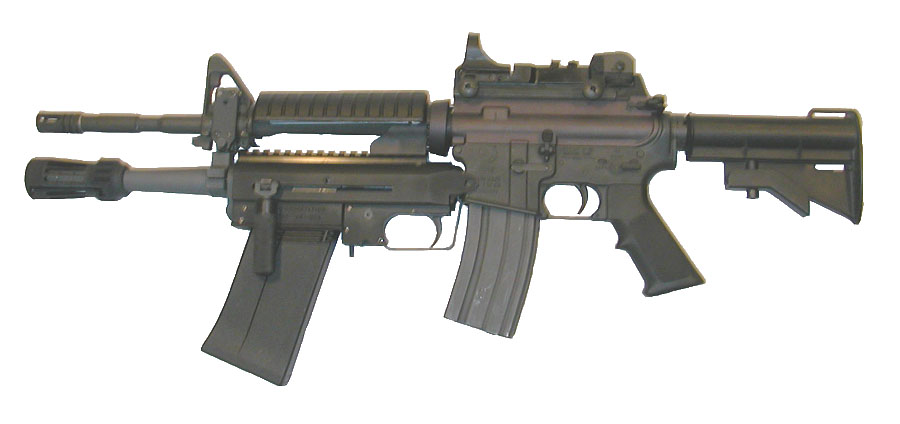
M26 Modular Accessory Shotgun System on M4 Carbine

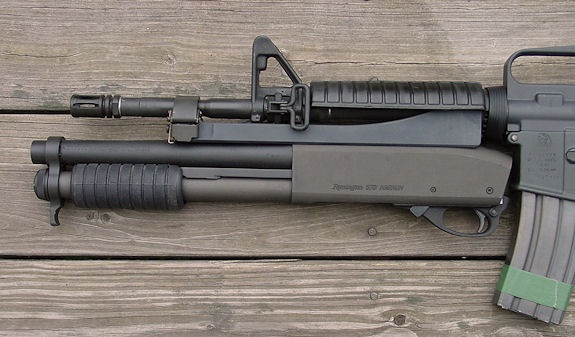
KAC Masterkey on M4 Carbine.
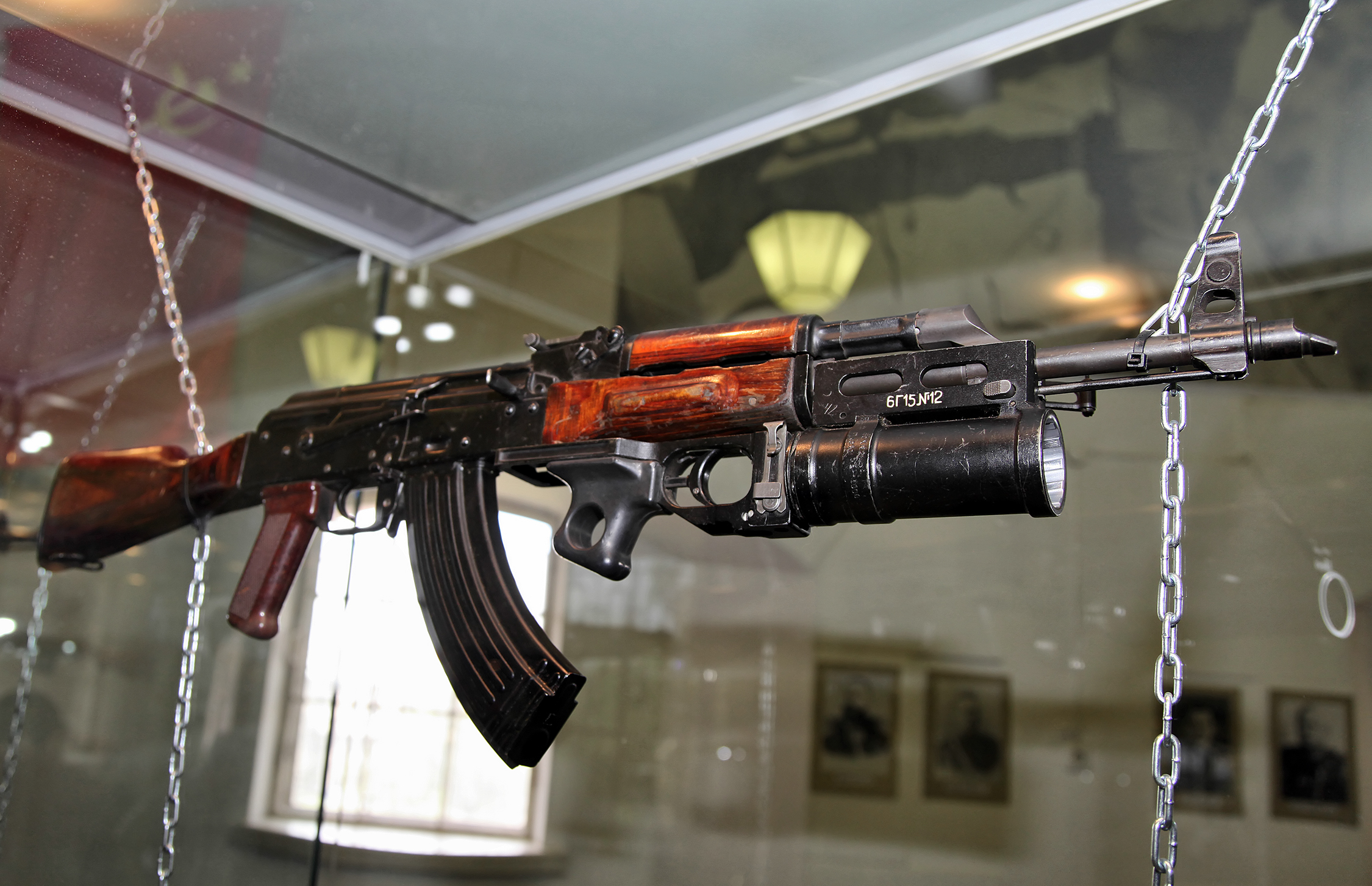
AKM with GP-25 grenade launcher

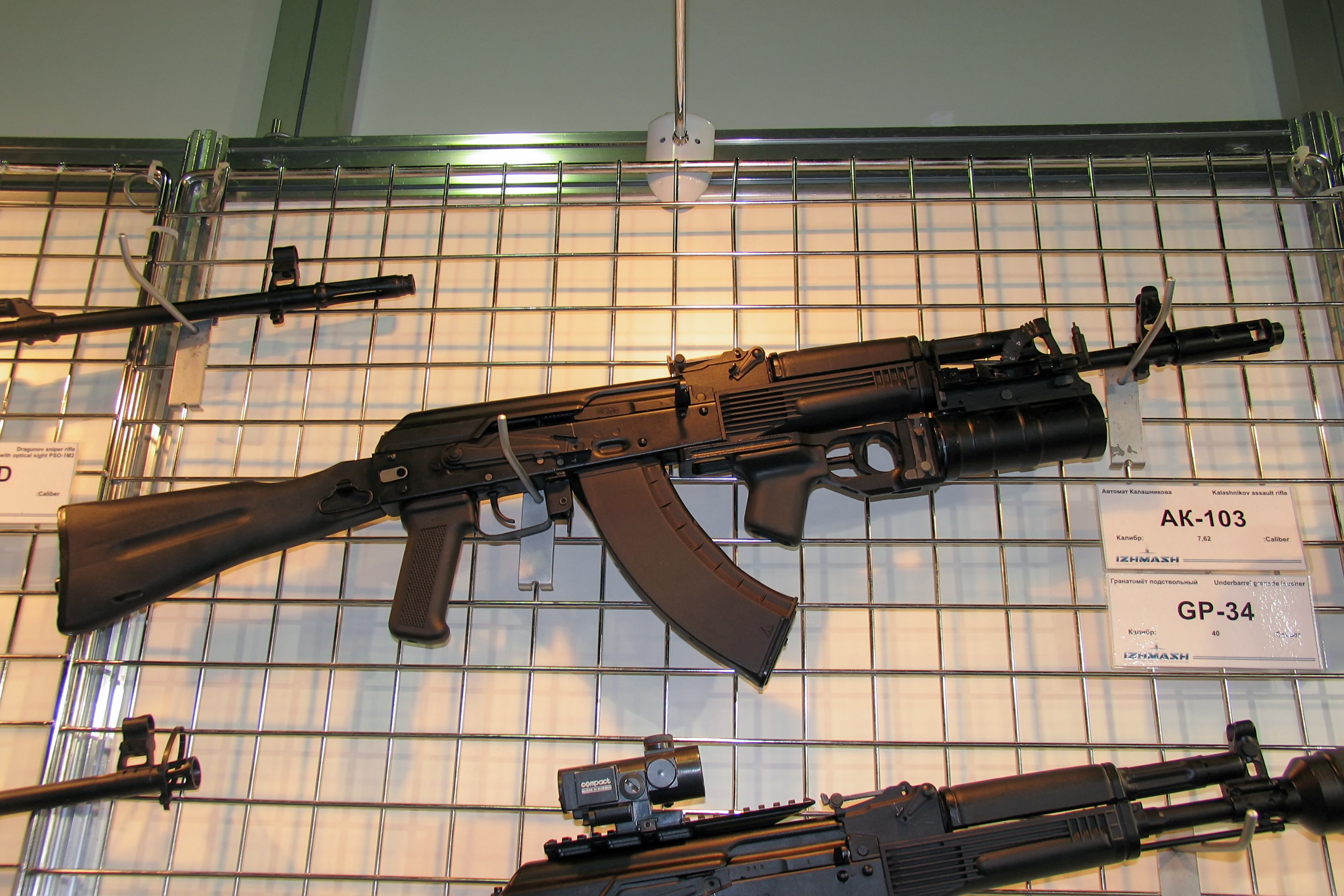
AK-103 with GP-34 Grenade Launcher.

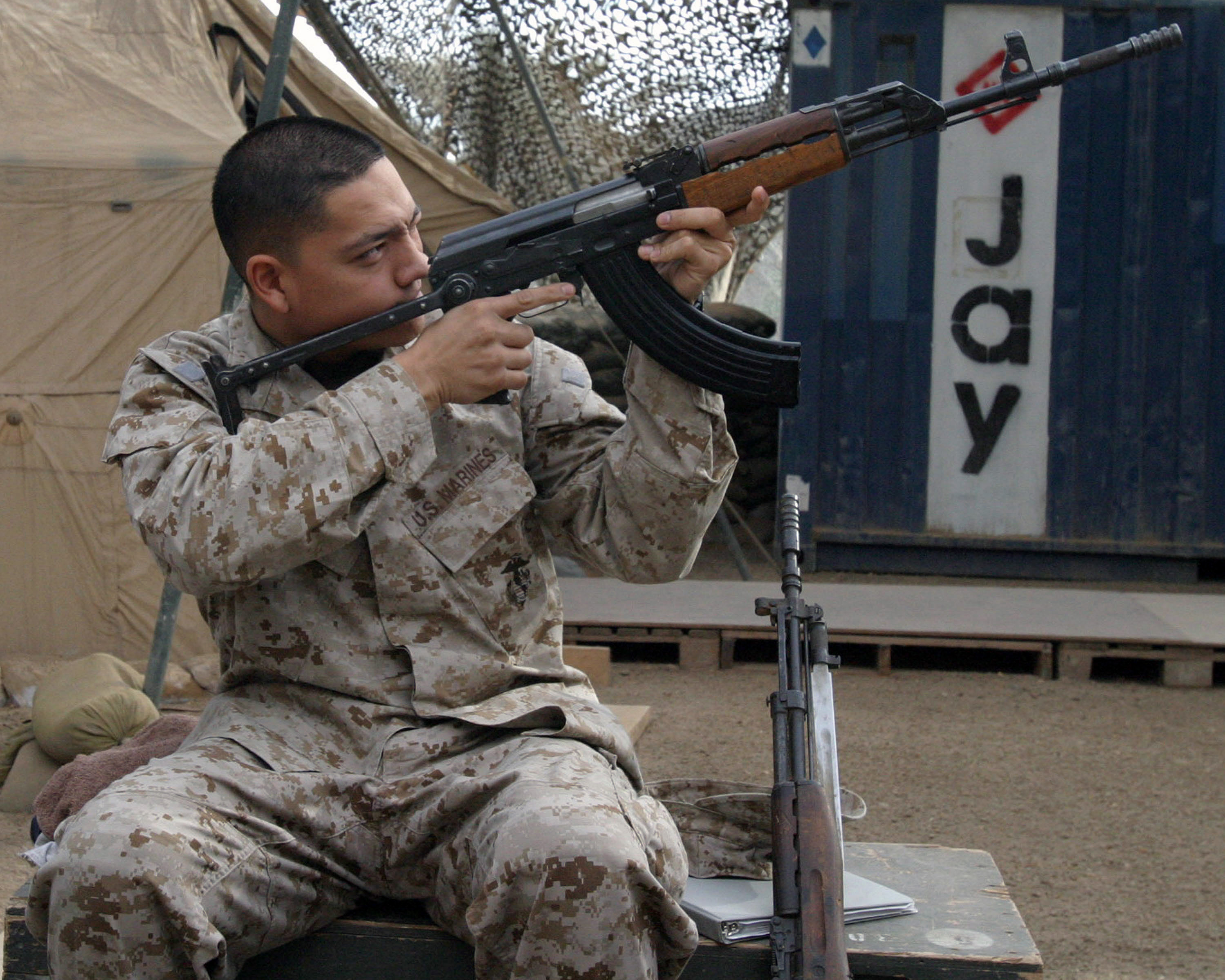
U.S. Marine sights a Zastava M70 with 22mm grenade launcher attached to the muzzle. Note: M59/66 (SKS) to the side which also has 22mm grenade launcher.

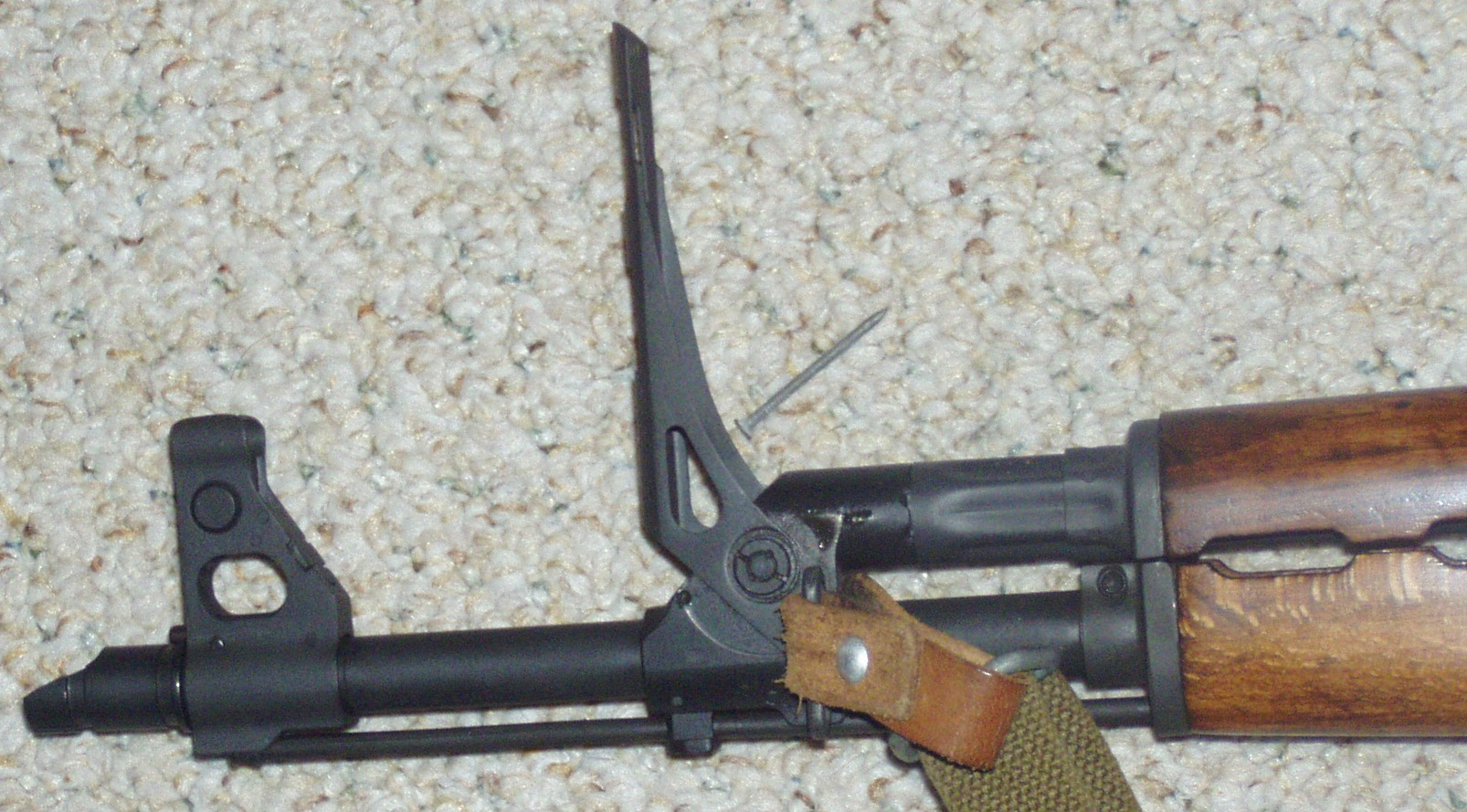
Zastava M70 rifle with grenade sights raised.

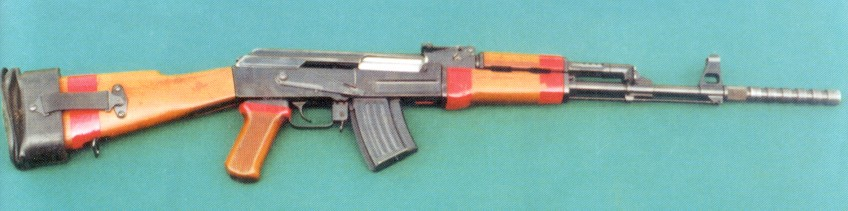
Polish kbkg wz. 1960 with 22mm rifle-grenade launcher attached to muzzle

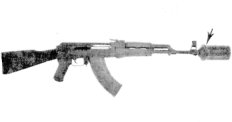
AK-47 with Kalashnikov grenade launcher mounted on the muzzle.

=== Accessories ===
Neither the AK-47 nor the M16 were designed to mount accessories, except for bayonets and a simple clamp-type bipod for the M16. However, with the advent of the Picatinny rail, the M16 has been shown capable of mounting a wide range of accessories, including grenade launchers, fore-grips, removable carry handle/rear sight assemblies, bipods, laser systems, electronic sights, night vision, tactical lights, etc. The AK-47 can also use Picatinny rail-mounted accessories, although its design and smaller fore-stock make it less adaptable.

In addition, the M16 is "the Swiss Army knife of rifles" a modular weapon system whose components can be arranged in a variety of different configurations. For example, an M16A2 with its standard iron sights and a standard forestock can be easily converted, in a matter of seconds and without the use of tools to an M16A4 with Picatinny rails, optical sights, and a variety of accessories. This is accomplished by simply pushing in two pins, removing the A2 upper receiver/barrel, and replacing it with an A4 upper receiver/barrel. Or, an M16A4 Rifle can be converted to an M4 Carbine in a few minutes by replacing the upper receiver/barrel and using simple hand tools to replace the fixed buttstock with a telescoping buttstock. As such, the M16 can be easily converted into different calibers and different types of weapons. The AK-47 has no such capability.

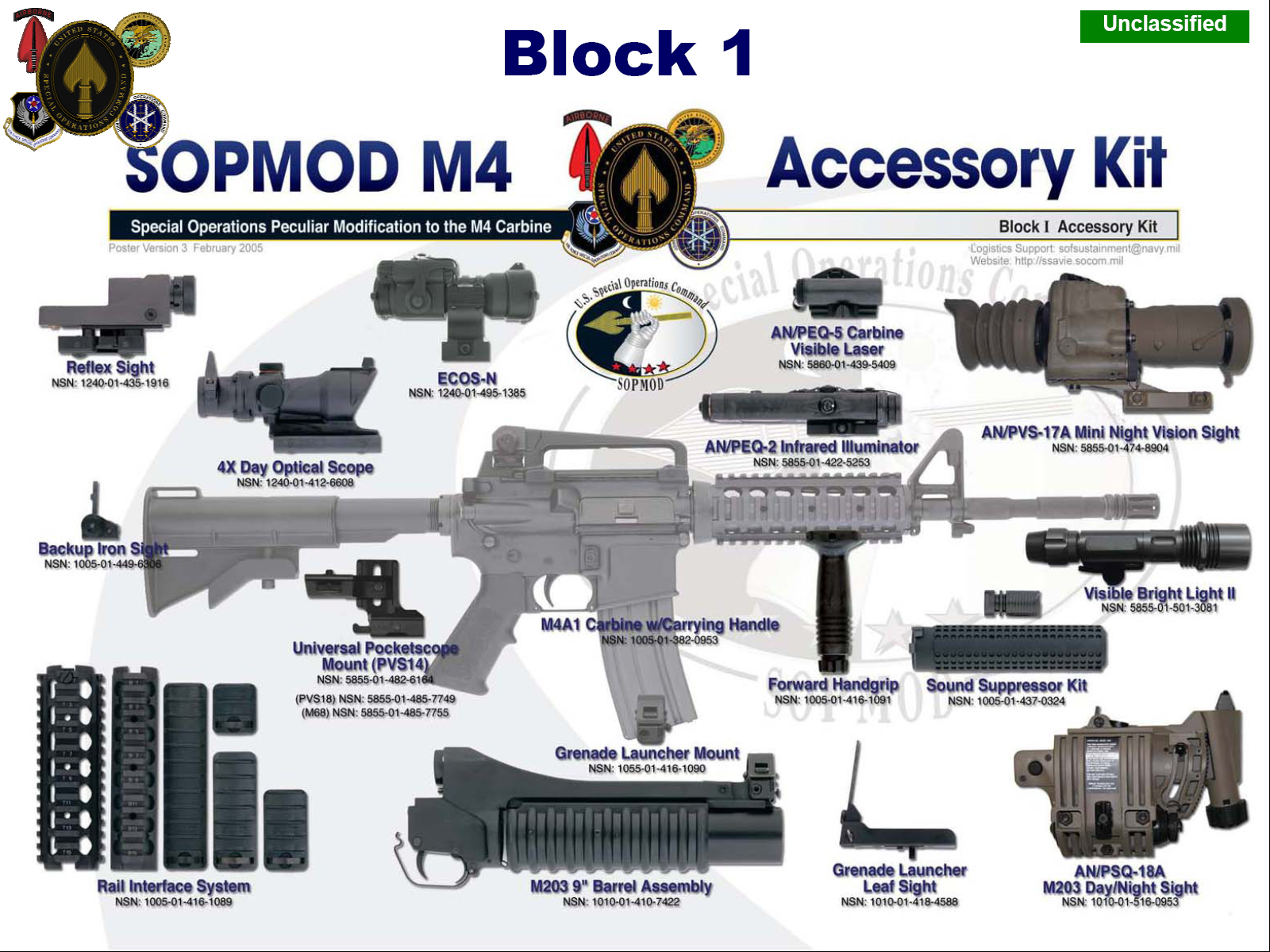
M4 Modular Weapon System shown with various accessories

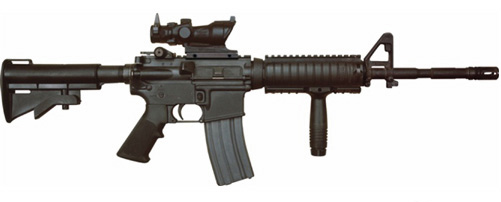
An M4A1 with SOPMOD package, including Rail Interface System and Trijicon 4× ACOG

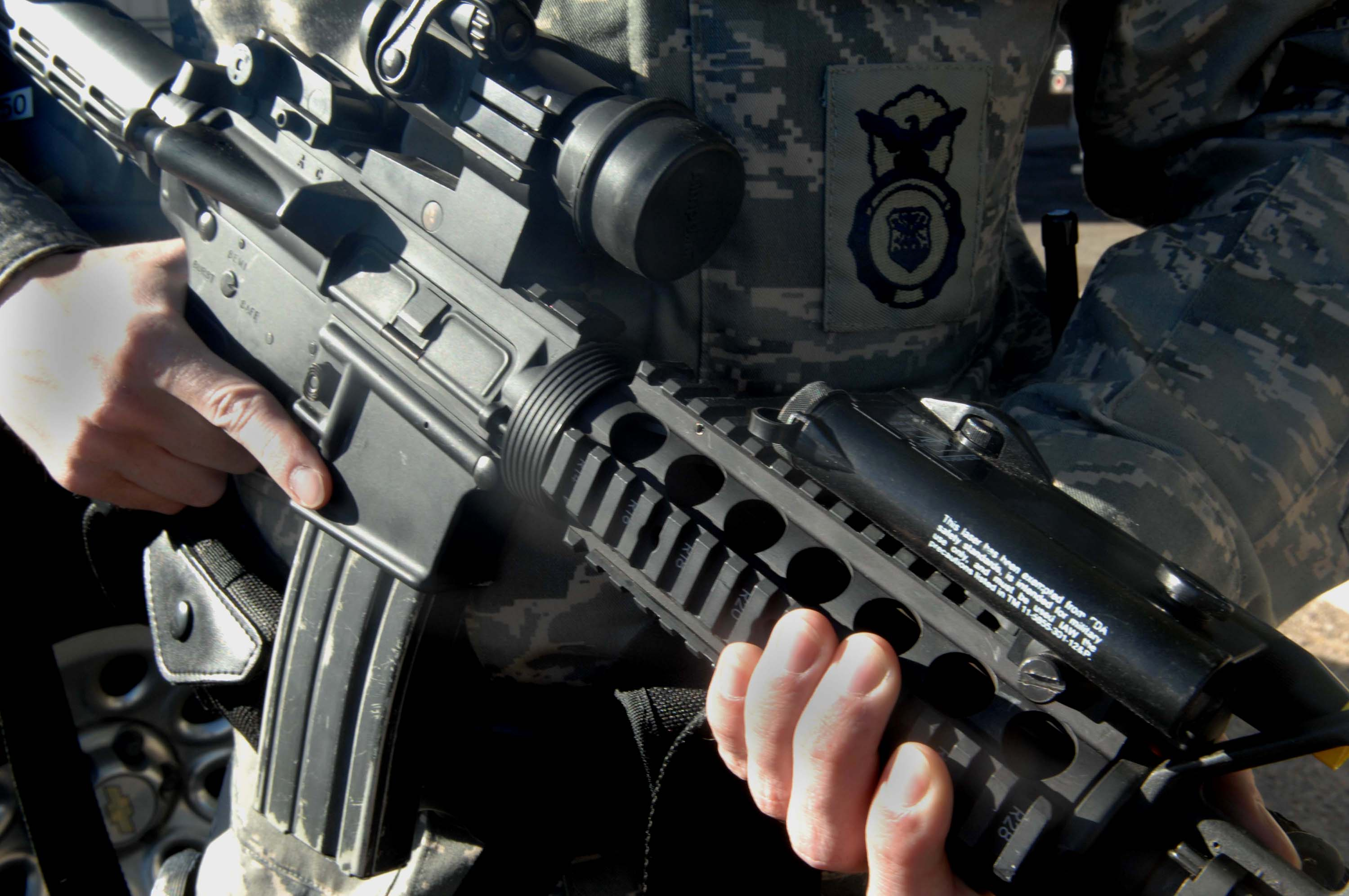
Close-up of M4 carbine with Picatinny rail mounted laser and with M68 Close Combat Optic.

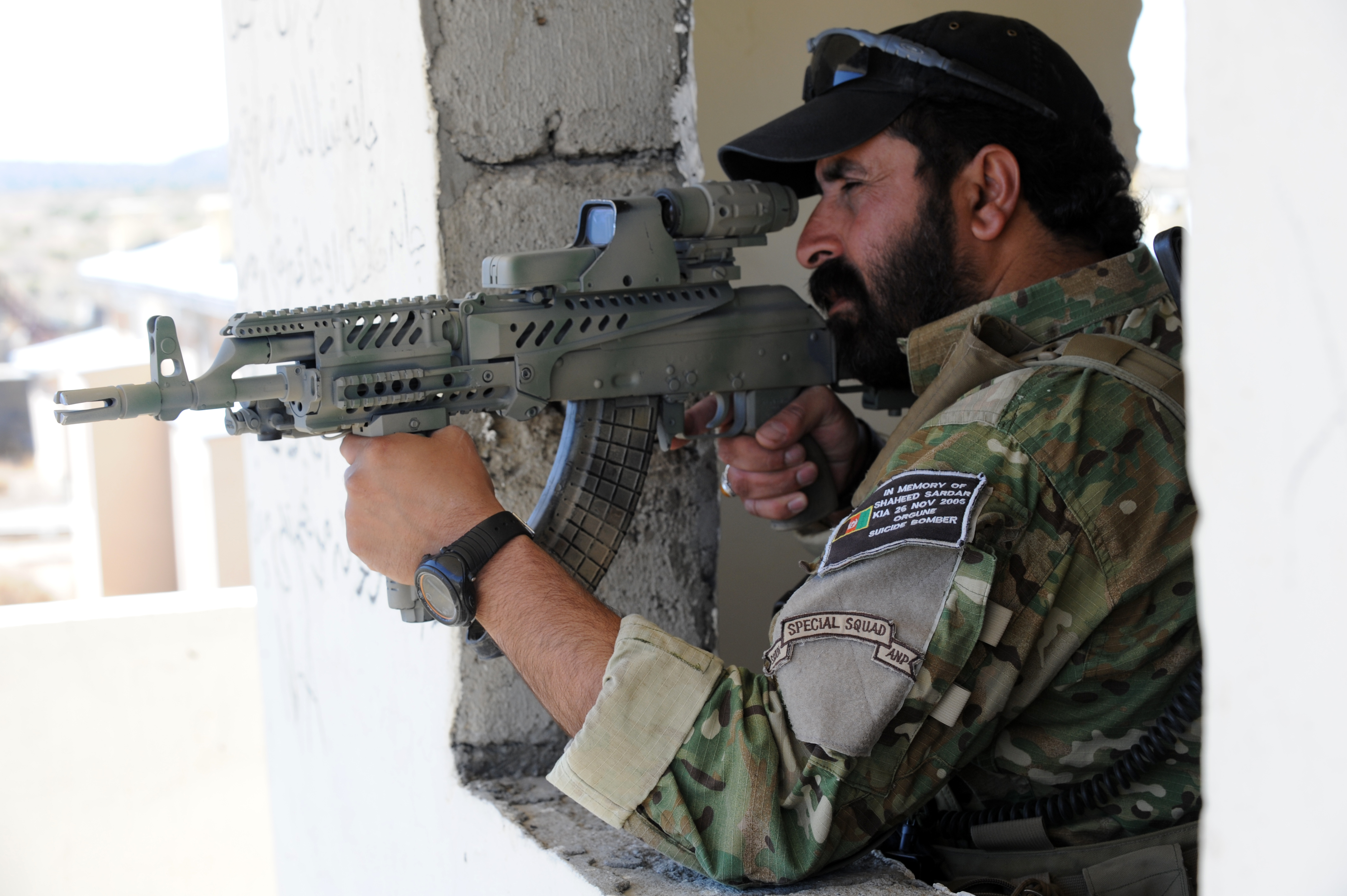
Afghan border police aiming an AK type rifle with Picatinny rails, holographic weapon sight and foregrip

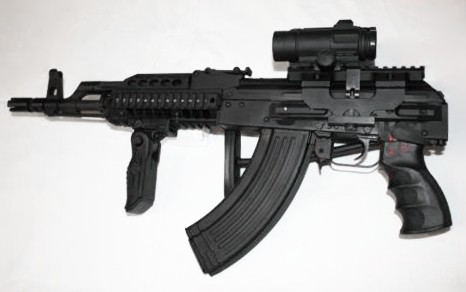
Hungarian AMD-65M with Picatinny rails, new handgrips, Aimpoint sight and sidefolding stock

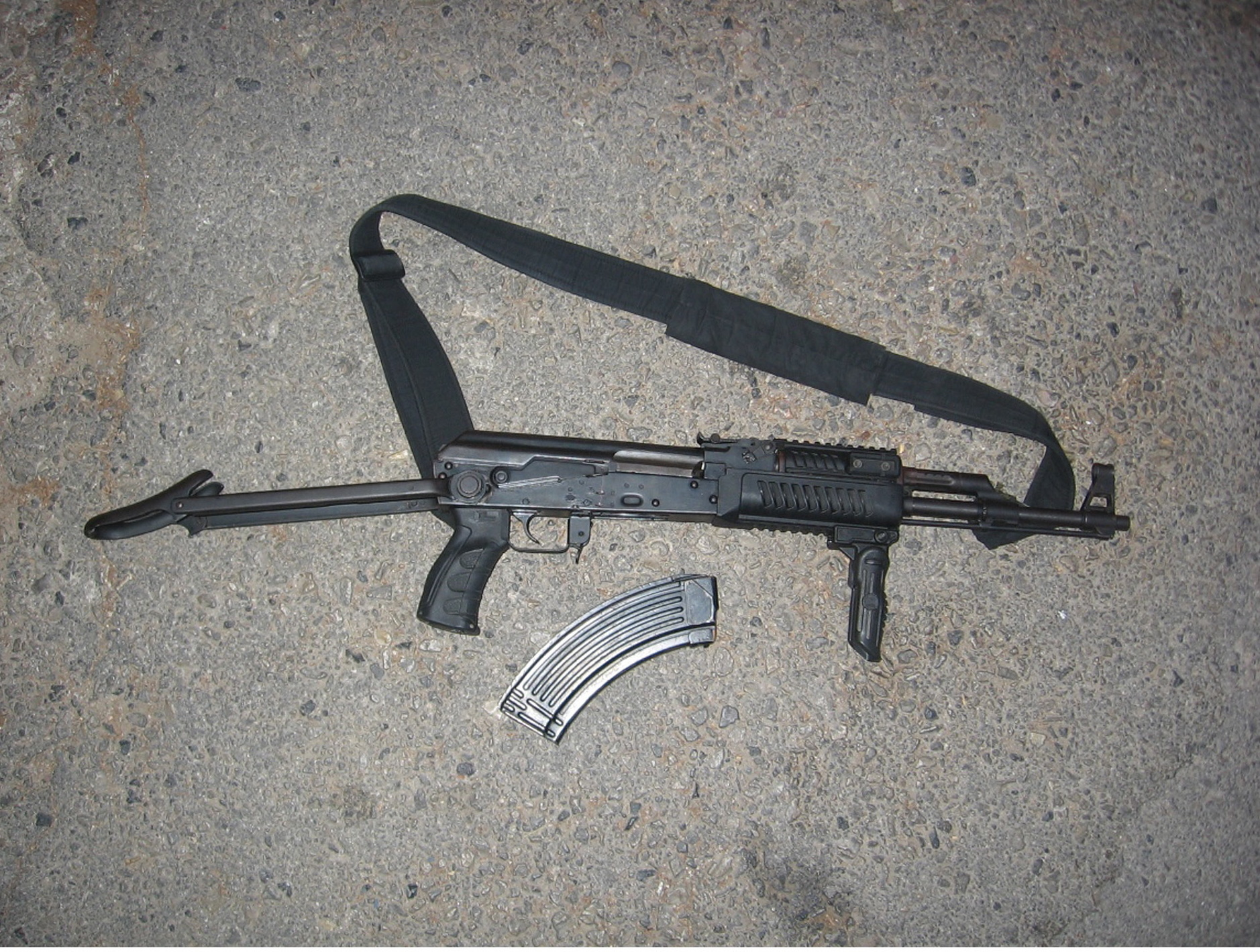
Type 56-1 with commercial Picatinny rail fore-stock and folding pistol-grip attachment

=== Bayonets ===
Today, bayonets are rarely used in combat. However, both the AK-47 and M16 retain bayonet lugs and bayonets are still issued. Also, bayonets are still used for controlling prisoners and as a weapon of "last resort". In addition, some authorities have concluded that bayonets serve as useful training aids in building morale and increasing desired aggression in troops.

The M16 is 44.25 inches (1124mm) long with an M7 bayonet attached. The M7 bayonet is based on earlier designs such as the M4, M5, & M6 bayonets, all of which are direct descendants of the M3 Fighting Knife and have spear-point blades with a half-sharpened secondary edge. The newer M9 bayonet has a clip-point blade with saw teeth along the spine, and can be used as a multi-purpose knife and wire-cutter when combined with its scabbard. The current USMC OKC-3S bayonet bears a resemblance to the Marines' iconic Ka-Bar fighting knife with serrations near the handle.

The AK is 40.15 inches (1020mm) long with an AKM-type bayonet attached. The AK-47 has an adequate but unremarkable bayonet. However, the AKM Type I bayonet (introduced in 1959) was a revolutionary design. It has a Bowie-style (clip-point) blade with sawteeth along the spine and can be used as a multi-purpose knife and wire cutter when combined with its steel scabbard. This design was copied by other nations and formed the basis of the US M9 bayonet. The AK-74 bayonet (introduced in 1983) represents a further refinement of the AKM bayonet. "It introduced a radical blade cross-section, that has a flat milled on one side near the edge and a corresponding flat milled on the opposite side near the false edge. The blade has a new spear point and an improved one-piece molded plastic grip making it a more effective fighting knife. It also has saw teeth on the false edge and the usual hole for use as a wire cutter. Some Chinese AK-type rifles such as the Type 56 include an integral folding spike bayonet, similar to the SKS rifle.

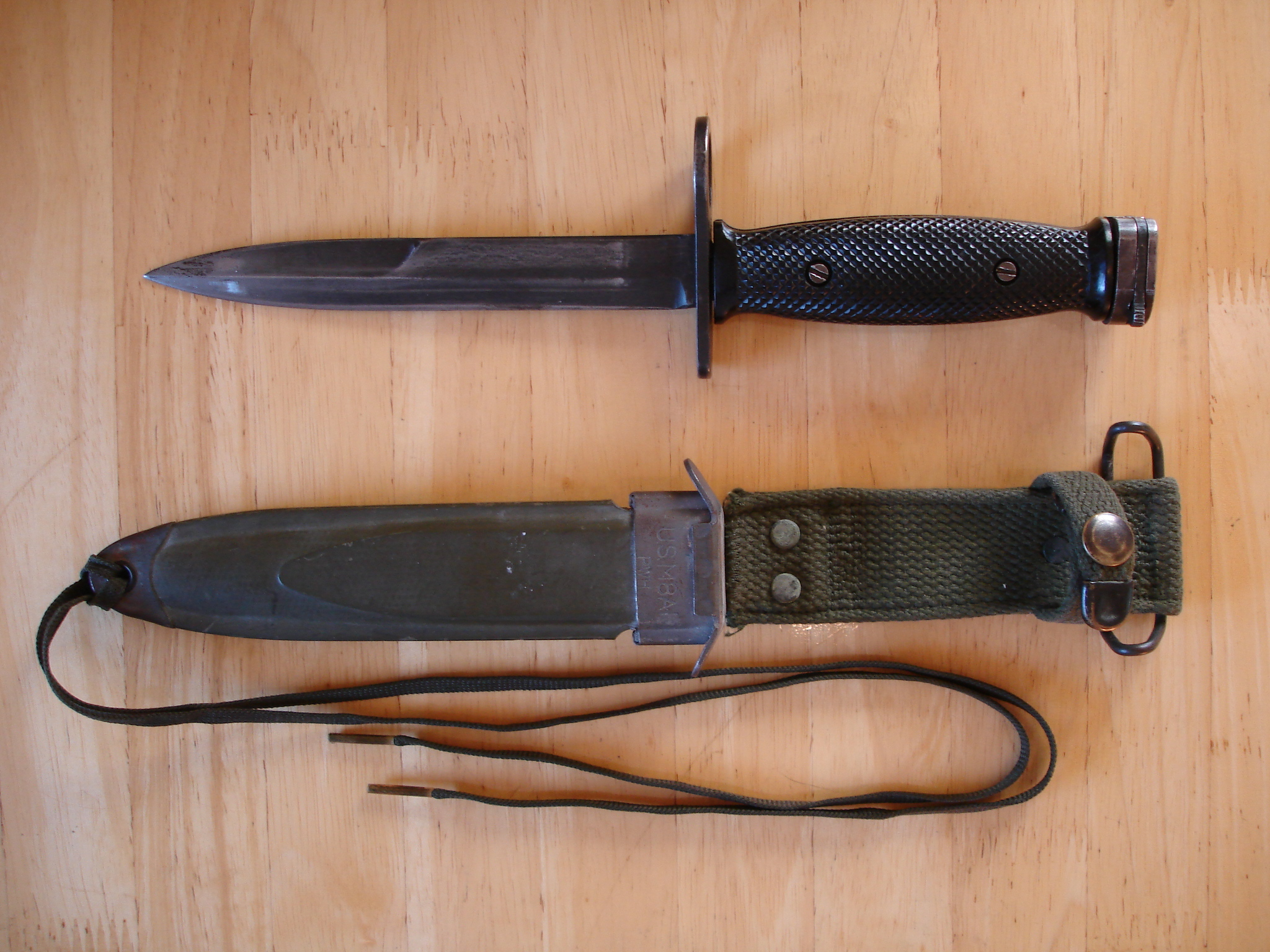
M7 Bayonet & M8A1 Sheath

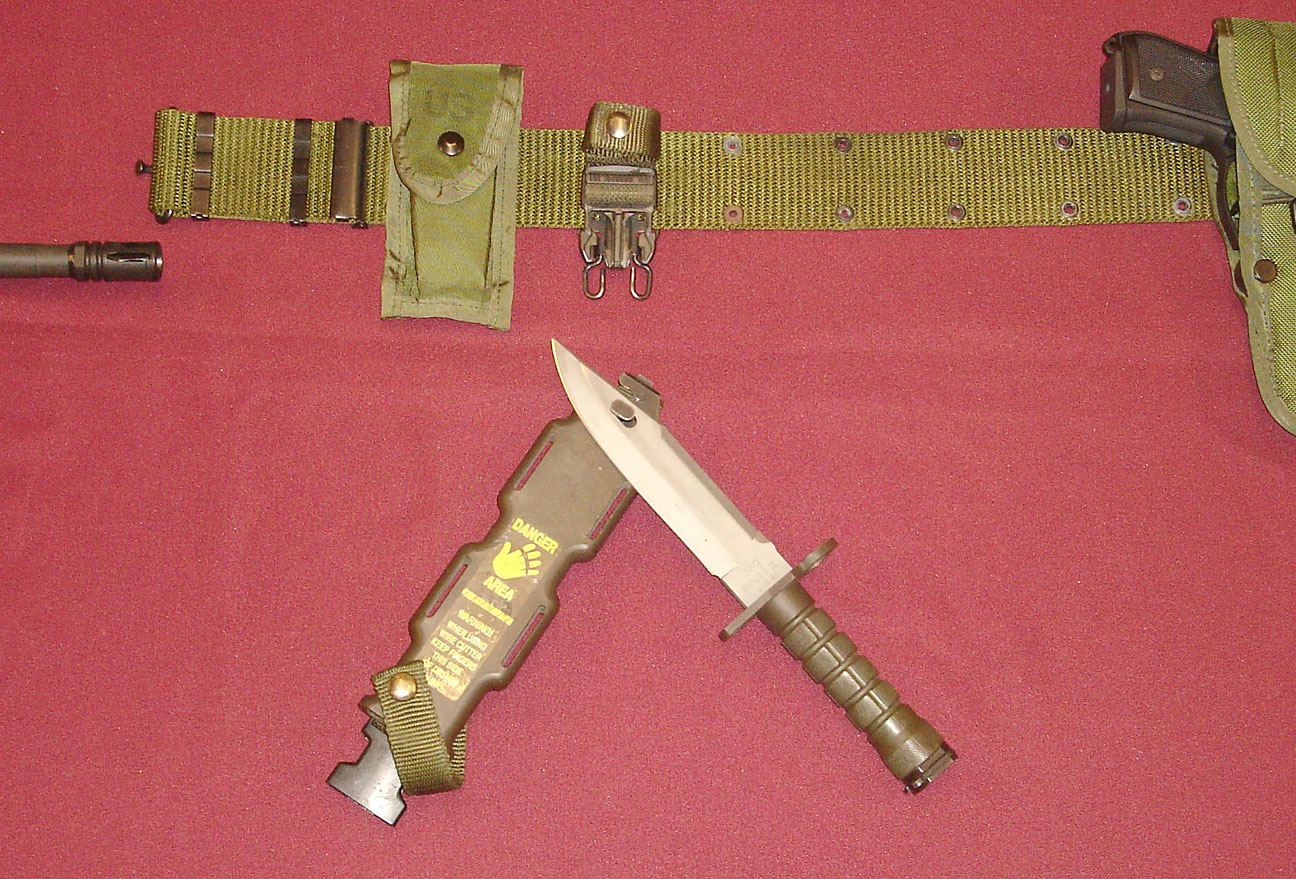
M9 bayonet in wire-cutter configuration

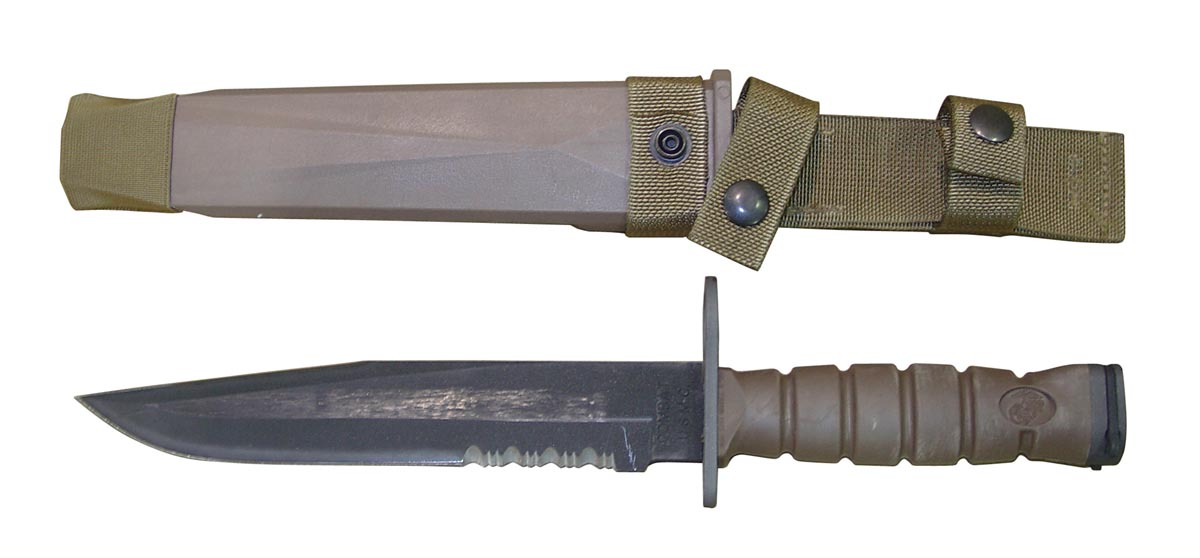
USMC OKC-3s bayonet

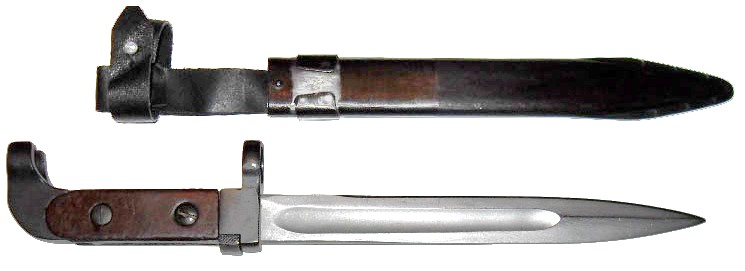
Original AK-47 bayonet

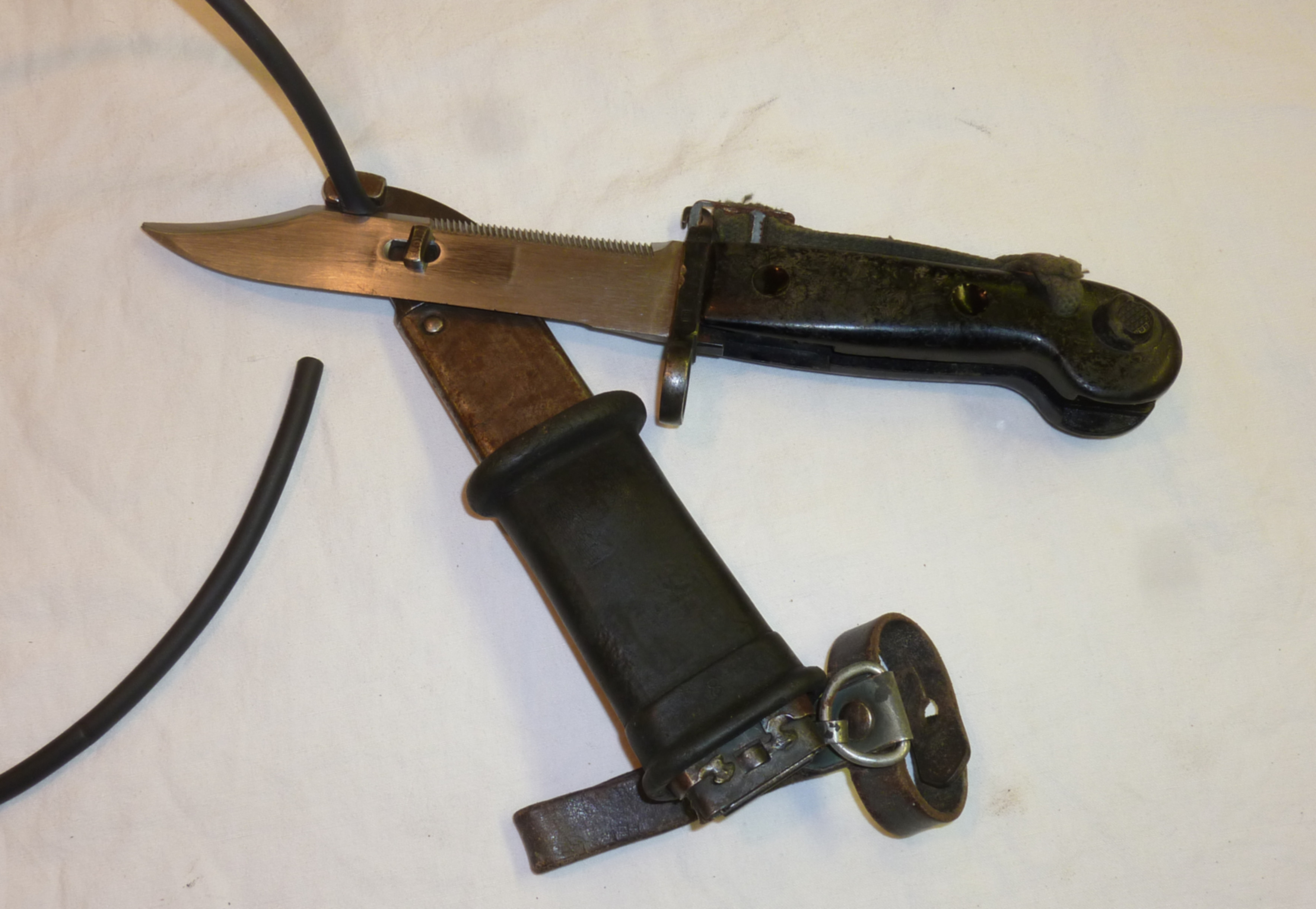
AKM bayonet in wire-cutter configuration

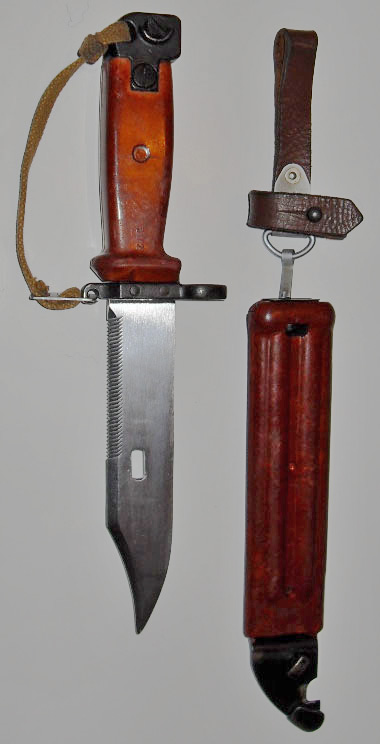
AKM type II bayonet

=== Reliability ===
Diagram of long-stroke gas operation system

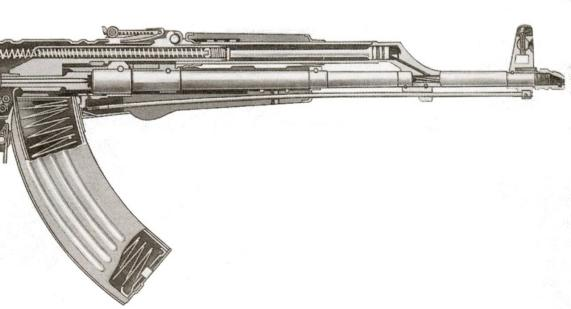
AK-47 long-stroke gas operation system

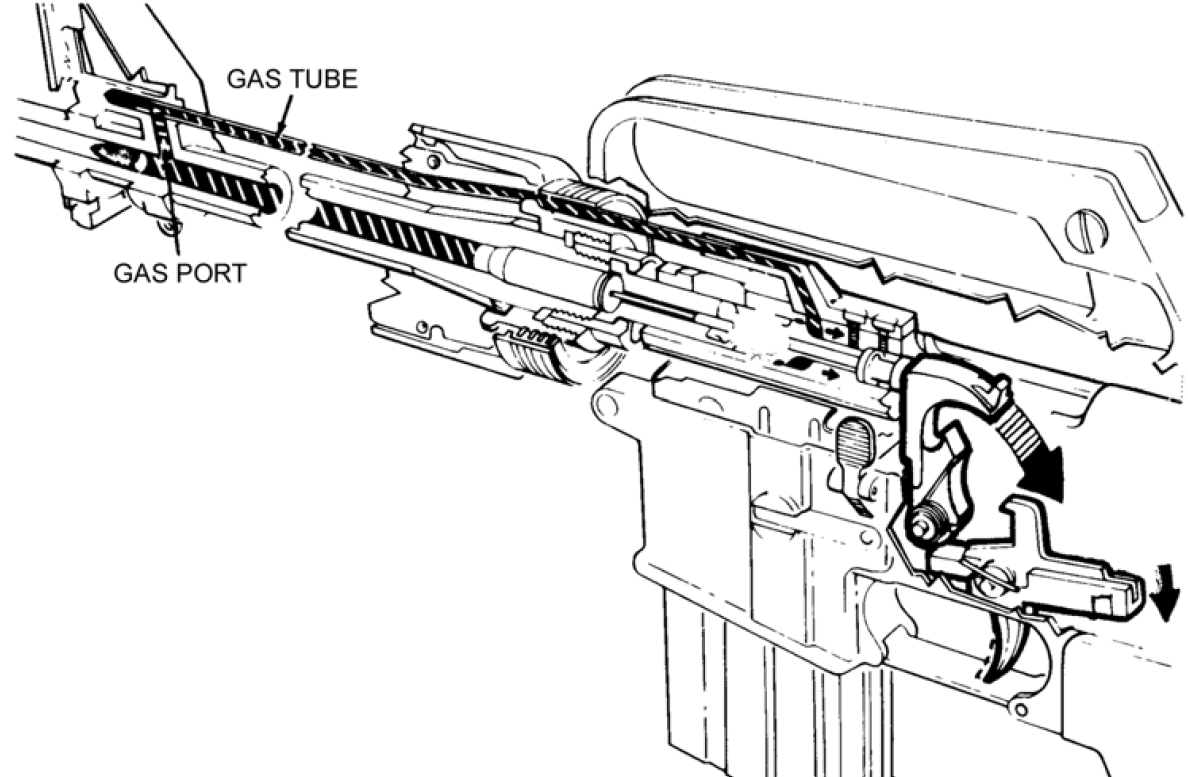
M16 internal piston gas system

The AK-47 has always enjoyed a reputation for rugged reliability and has a malfunction rate of one per 1000 rounds fired. It uses a long-stroke gas system, where the gas is sent from the barrel to push a piston attached to the bolt carrier, thus operating the action. The gas tube is fairly large and is visible above the barrel with ports or vents to allow the excess "dirty" gas to escape without affecting the action. The AK-47 is often built with generous clearances, allowing it to function easily in a dirty environment with little or no maintenance. This makes it reliable but less accurate.

The M16 has always had a reputation for poor reliability and has a malfunction rate of two per 1000 rounds fired. The M16 uses a unique gas-powered operating system:

This gas operating system works by passing high-pressure propellant gasses tapped from the barrel down a tube and into the carrier group within the upper receiver, and is commonly but incorrectly referred to as a "direct impingement gas system". The gas expands within a donut-shaped gas cylinder within the carrier. Because the bolt is prevented from moving forward by the barrel, the carrier is driven to the rear by the expanding gasses and thus converts the energy of the gas to movement of the rifle’s parts. The bolt bears a piston head and the cavity in the bolt carrier is the piston sleeve. It is more correct to call it an "internal piston" system.
–Armalite Technical Note 54: Direct Impingement Versus Piston Drive

This design is much lighter and more compact than a traditional gas-piston design. However, this design requires that combustion byproducts from the discharged cartridge be blown into the receiver. This accumulating carbon and vaporized metal build-up within the receiver and bolt carrier negatively affects reliability and necessitates more intensive maintenance on the part of the individual soldier. The internal piston operation increases the amount of heat that is deposited in the receiver while firing the M16 and causes the essential lubricant to be "burned off". This requires frequent and generous applications of appropriate lubricant. Lack of proper lubrication is the most common source of weapon stoppages or jams.

The original M16 fared poorly in the forests of Vietnam and was infamous for reliability problems in the harsh environment. As a result, it became the target of a Congressional investigation. The investigation found that:

- The M16 was billed as self-cleaning (when no weapon is or ever has been).
- The M16 was issued to troops without cleaning kits or instructions on how to clean the rifle.
- The M16 and 5.56×45mm cartridge was tested and approved with the use of a DuPont IMR8208M stick powder, which was switched to Olin Mathieson WC846 ball powder which produced much more fouling, which quickly jammed the action of the M16 (unless the gun was cleaned well and often).
- The M16 lacked a forward assist (rendering the rifle inoperable when it jammed).
- The M16 lacked a chromed barrel and chamber, causing corrosion problems, and contributing to case swelling and extraction failures (which was considered the most severe problem and required extreme measures to clear, such as inserting the cleaning rod down the barrel and knocking the spent cartridge out).

When these issues were addressed and corrected by the M16A1, the reliability problems decreased greatly. According to a 1968 Department of Army report, the M16A1 rifle achieved widespread acceptance by U.S. troops in Vietnam. "Most men armed with the M16 in Vietnam rated this rifle's performance high, however, many men entertained some misgivings about the M16's reliability. When asked what weapon they preferred to carry in combat, 85 percent indicated that they wanted either the M16 or its submachine gun version, the XM177E2. (The M14 was preferred by 15 percent, while less than one percent wished to carry either the Stoner rifle, the AK-47, the carbine or a pistol.)" In March 1970, the "President’s Blue Ribbon Defense Panel" concluded that the issuance of the M16 saved the lives of 20,000 U.S. servicemen during the Vietnam War, who would have otherwise died had the M14 remained in service. However, the M16 rifle's reputation continues to suffer.

After the introduction of the M4 Carbine, it was found that the shorter barrel length of 14.5 inches also harm reliability, as the gas port is located closer to the chamber than the gas port of the standard length M16 rifle: 7.5 inches instead of 13 inches. This affects the M4's timing and increases the amount of stress and heat on the critical components, thereby reducing reliability. In a 2002 assessment, the USMC found that the M4 malfunctioned three times more often than the M16A4 (the M4 failed 186 times for 69,000 rounds fired, while the M16A4 failed 61 times). Thereafter, the Army and Colt worked to make modifications to the M4s and M16A4s to address the problems found.

In tests conducted in 2005 and 2006 the Army found that on average, the new M4s and M16s fired approximately 5,000 rounds between stoppages. In 2010, U.S. Marines operating in Afghanistan reported no reliability problems with their M16 rifles and M4 carbines. "This is more so given the account of Chief Warrant Officer Joshua S. Smith, the Marine responsible for weapons training and performance in the Third Battalion, Sixth Marines, which is engaged in daily fighting in Marja. 'We've had nil in the way of problems; we've had no issues,' he said of the M-4s and M-16s. The battalion has about 350 M-16s and 700 M-4s, he said."

Gas tube mislabeled as direct impingement. The bolt and carrier with their internal-piston mechanism are not shown.

Short-stroke gas piston. The bolt and carrier are not shown.

The newest version of the M16 in U.S. service is the HK416 (a.k.a. the M27 Infantry Automatic Rifle) which uses a proprietary gas system derived from the HK G36, replacing the internal-piston gas system used by the standard M16/M4. The HK system uses a short-stroke gas piston driving an operating rod to force the bolt carrier to the rear. This design prevents combustion gases from entering the weapon's interior, a shortcoming with internal piston and direct impingement systems. The reduction in heat and fouling of the bolt carrier group increases the reliability of the weapon and extends the interval between stoppages. The short-stroke gas piston requires less maintenance and cleaning. It reduces operator cleaning time and stress on critical components. "Improving the service interval requirements provides a major benefit to soldiers that may not have the ability or opportunity to thoroughly clean their rifle. Also, the design of the external gas piston system is less susceptible to build up of other contaminants in extreme environments." During factory tests, the HK416 fired 10,000 rounds in full auto without malfunctioning.

=== Magazines ===
"Magazines are one of the most important elements of any firearm design. They are responsible for the feeding portion of the cycle of operation. Even in the most proven arm that reliably extracts and ejects, the magazine has to be 100 percent reliable for it to consistently feed properly."

The AK-47's 30-round magazines have a pronounced curve that allows them to smoothly feed ammunition into the chamber. Their heavy steel construction combined with "feed-lips" (the surfaces at the top of the magazine that control the angle at which the cartridge enters the chamber) machined from a single steel billet makes them highly resistant to damage. These magazines are so strong that "Soldiers have been known to use their mags as hammers, and even bottle openers." This makes the AK-47 magazine more reliable, although heavier than U.S. and NATO magazines. The early slab-sided steel AK-47 magazines weigh 0.43 kg (0.95 lb) empty. The later steel AKM magazines had lighter sheet-metal bodies with prominent reinforcing ribs weighing 0.33 kg (0.73 lb) empty. The current issue steel-reinforced plastic magazines are even lighter, weighing 0.25 kg (0.55 lb) empty. Early steel AK-47 magazines are 9.75 inches long, and the later ribbed steel AKM and newer plastic magazines are about an inch shorter.

The M16's magazine was meant to be a lightweight, disposable item. As such, it is made of pressed/stamped aluminum and was not designed to be durable. Therefore, it is easier to damage than an AK-47 magazine and the feed lips are proportionally weaker when compared to the AK-47. The M16 originally used a 20-round magazine which was later replaced by a bent 30-round design. As a result, the magazine follower tends to rock or tilt, causing malfunctions. Many non-U.S. and commercial magazines have been developed to effectively mitigate these shortcomings (e.g., H&K's all-stainless-steel magazine, Magpul's polymer P-MAG, etc.). Standard USGI aluminum 30-round M16 magazines weigh 0.11 kg (0.24 lb) empty and are 7.1 inches long. The newer plastic magazines are about a half-inch longer. The newer steel magazines are about a halfinch longer and 4 ounces heavier. The M16's magazine has become the unofficial NATO STANAG magazine and is currently used by many Western Nations, in numerous weapon systems.

In 2009, the U.S. Military began fielding an "improved magazine" identified by a tan-colored follower. "The new follower incorporates an extended rear leg and modified bullet protrusion for improved round stacking and orientation. The self-leveling/anti-tilt follower minimizes jamming while a wider spring coil profile creates even force distribution. The performance gains have not added weight or cost to the magazines."

In July 2016, the U.S. Army introduced the new Enhanced Performance Magazine. These new magazines have tan bodies and blue followers. "Unlike previous magazines, the EPM uses a new, modified magazine body (and therefore not interchangeable, hence the different color) which presents the rounds at a more favorable angle to the rifle’s feed way, improving reliability and, importantly, preventing the hardened steel tips of new 5.56mm M855A1 Enhanced Performance Rounds from contacting the aluminum feed ramp section on M4 type rifles." This allows for a dramatic 300% increase in the number of rounds fired between stoppages.

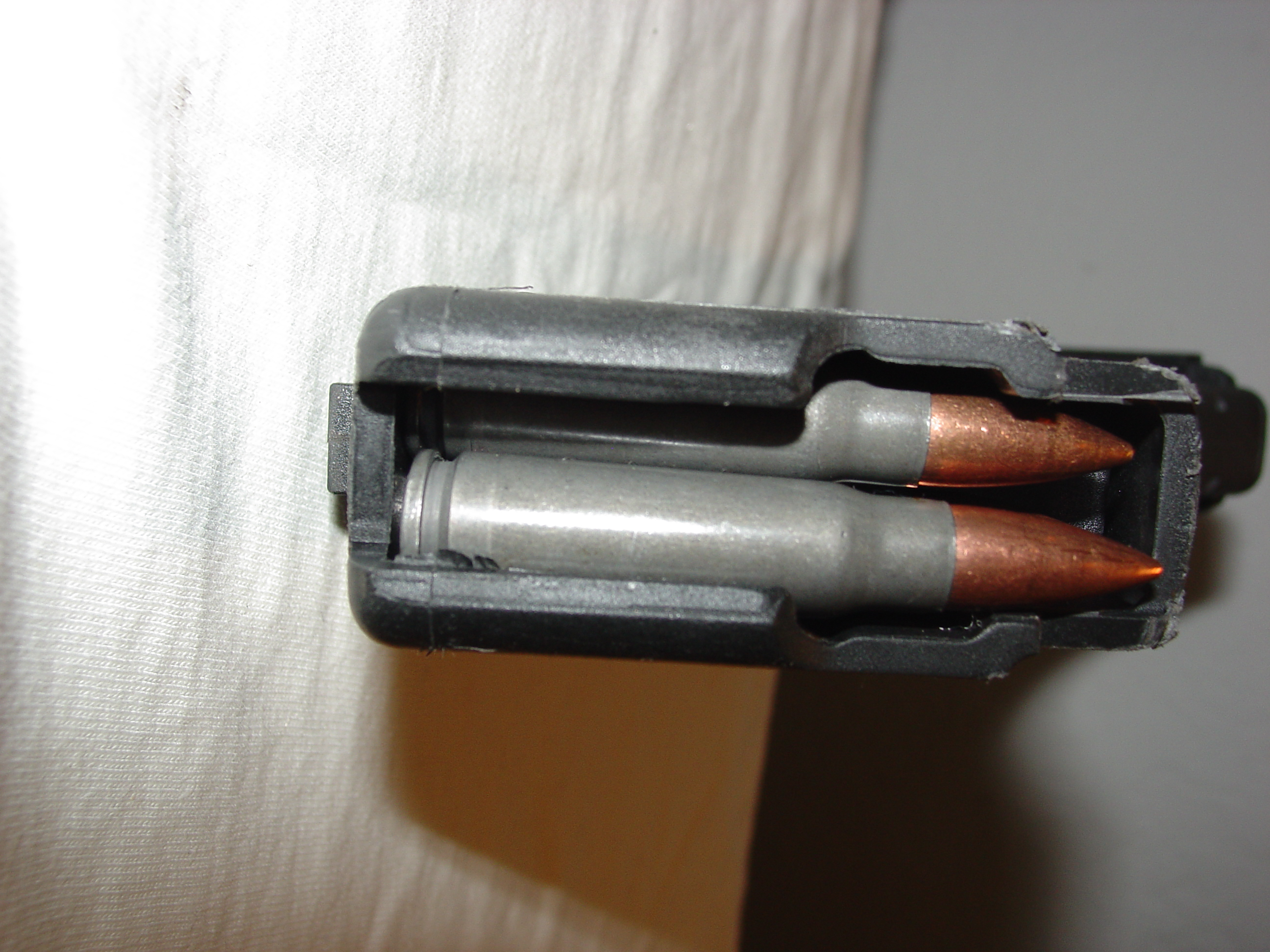
Feed-lips of plastic AK-47 magazine

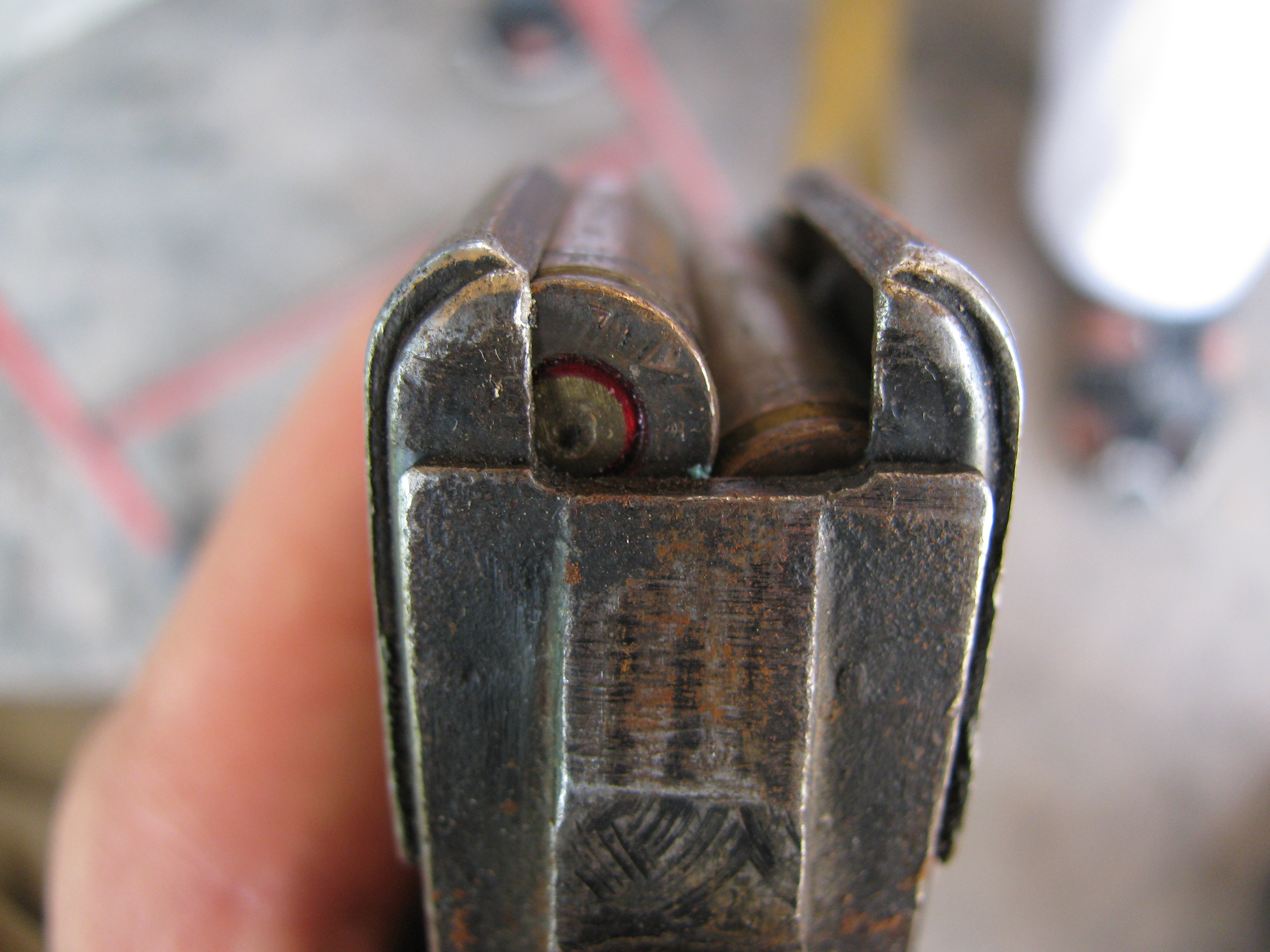
Feed-lips of steel AK-47 magazine

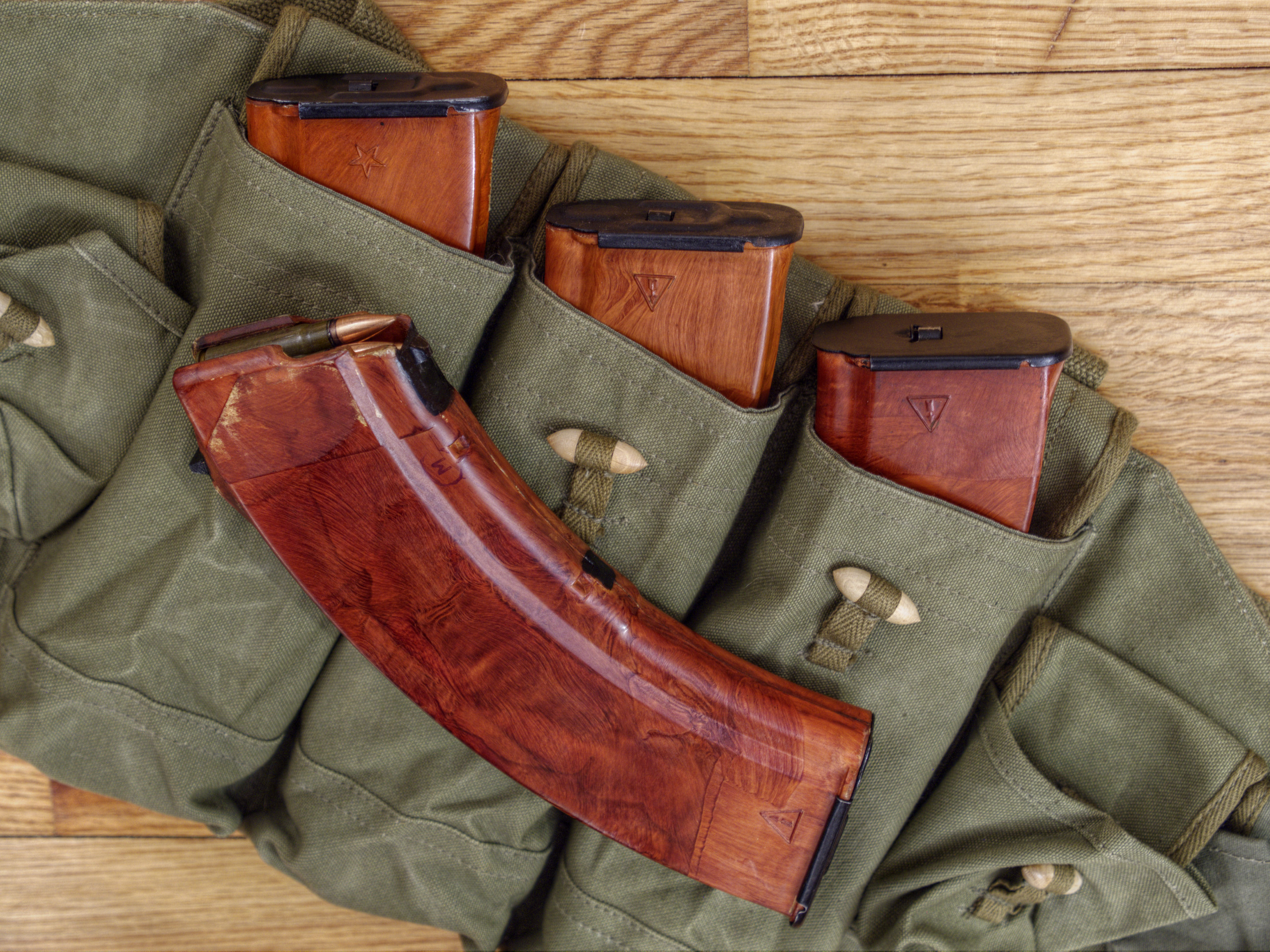
Bakelite AK-74 magazines

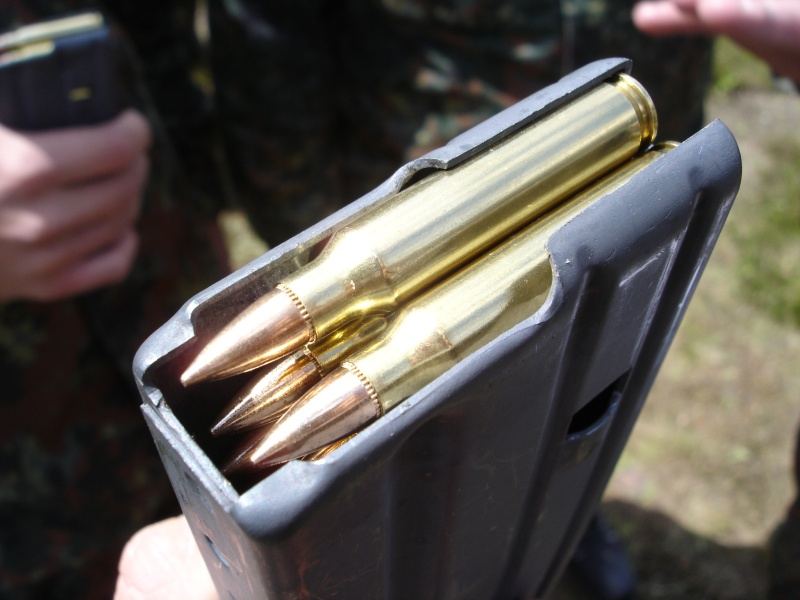
Feed-lips of M16 magazine

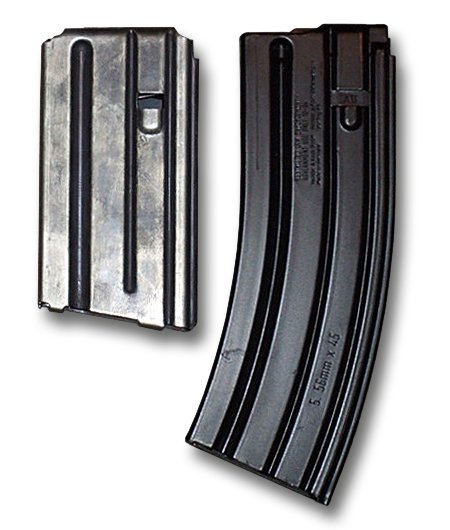
Vietnam era 20-round M16 magazine (left) and current issue NATO STANAG 30-round magazine (right).

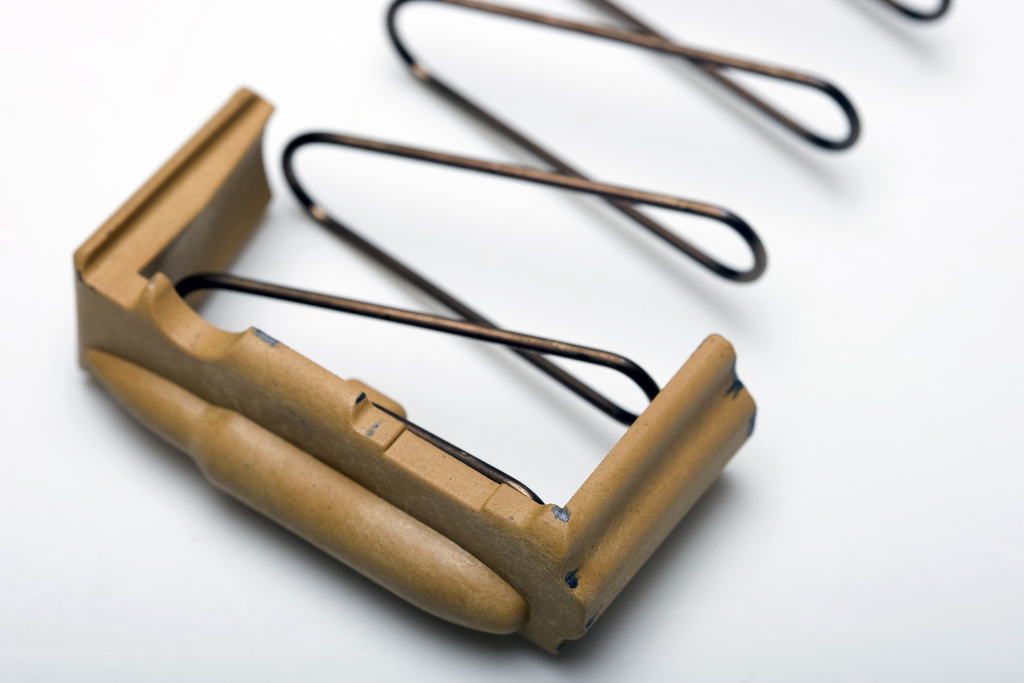
Improved M16 magazine follower

=== Service life ===
AK-47-type rifles are made in dozens of countries, with "quality ranging from finely engineered weapons to pieces of questionable workmanship." As a result, the AK-47 has a service/system life of approximately 6,000, to 10,000, to 15,000 rounds. The AK-47 was designed to be a cheap, simple, easy-to-manufacture assault rifle, perfectly matching Soviet military doctrine that treats equipment and weapons as disposable items. As units are often deployed without adequate logistical support and dependent on "battlefield cannibalization" for resupply, it is more cost-effective to replace rather than repair weapons.

Both the AK-47 and the M16 have small parts and springs that need to be replaced every few thousand rounds. However "Every time (an AK) is disassembled beyond the field stripping stage, it will take some time for some parts to regain their fit, some parts may tend to shake loose and fall out when firing the weapon. Some parts of the AK-47 line are riveted together. Repairing these can be quite a hassle since the end of the rivet has to be ground off and a new one set after the part is replaced."

M16-type rifles are made by dozens of manufacturers around the world, to the highest standards "the goal of which is to ensure that products designed for military use meet the requirements with concerning quality, durability, ruggedness, commonality, interchangeability, total cost of ownership, logistics and other military and defense-related objectives." The M16's barrel life is approximately 15,000 rounds for standard-issue M16A4s and M4s. Cold-hammer forged steel barrels such as those used on the HK416 have a service life of 20,000 to 50,000 rounds depending on the intensity of use. A badly worn M16 barrel will cause the bullets to tumble in flight. However, the M16's upper receiver/barrel may be swapped out in a matter of seconds, without the use of tools, simply by pushing out two pins. The M16 was designed to be a serviceable assault rifle, perfectly matching American military doctrine where units are resupplied continuously and are expected to perform most of their maintenance and repairs in the field. As such, American units are well-supplied and are quickly provided with whatever spare parts they need by their logistical support systems.

An M16 rifle that has been declared non-serviceable may be sent to a Small Arms Repair Facility, where it is overhauled, upgraded, and returned to service. The M16 rifle may be recycled almost infinitely, as any individual part can be easily replaced until none of the original parts remain.

=== Miscellaneous ===
M16	AK-47
Technical
5.56×45mm cartridge dimensions	7.62×39mm cartridge dimensions
The M16 has a chamber pressure of 52,000 psi	The AK-47 has a chamber pressure of 50,000 psi
The M16s Rifling is: early models have 4 grooves, right hand twist, 1 turn in 14 inches (355.6 mm); later models have 6 grooves, right hand twist, 1 turn in 12 inches (304.8 mm); most current models have 6 grooves, right hand twist, 1 turn in 7 inches (177.8 mm); some current models have 6 grooves, right hand twist, 1 turn in 9 inches (228.6 mm)	The AK-47s Rifling is: 4 grooves, right hand twist, 1 turn in 9.25 inches (235 mm)
Features
The M16 has a flash-hider or flash-suppressor. Also, current M16 flash-suppressors also act as compensators.	The AK-47 does not have a flash-hider. However, all AKM and current AK models have a simple slant-type muzzle-brake or compensator.
The M16 can mount several types of silencers and sound suppressors	The AK-47 can mount PBS-1 silencer (sound suppressor)
The M16 uses synthetic furniture which is more durable than wood.	The AK-47 uses wood furniture which can break, split, crack and rot. However, later model AKs use synthetic furniture.
The M16 can be field stripped without tools	The AK-47 can be field stripped without tools
The M16 has a large storage compartment in the buttstock that holds the rifle's cleaning kit (or anything else that will fit inside).	The AK-47 has a small storage compartment in the buttstock that only holds the rifle's cleaning kit capsule.
The M16s multi-piece cleaning rod is located in the buttstock (or wherever else the soldier put it), and it cannot be easily reached and assembled if needed to clear a malfunction.	The AK-47s one-piece cleaning rod is located below the barrel and can be easily reached if needed to clear a malfunction.
The M16 can be disassembled into upper and lower halves, shortening the overall length for ease of storage and transport.	
The M16s bolt carrier group is small enough that an extra group can be carried as a back-up. If necessary a malfunctioning group can be quickly and easily removed, and replaced.	
Shortcomings
Early model M16 barrels could bend under rough handling or while firing as the barrel overheats. However, this shortcoming was corrected by the M16A2.	
Early model M16 furniture could be damaged by rough handling. However, this shortcoming was corrected by the M16A2.	
Barrels smaller than .25 caliber, such as those found on the M16, have a propensity to retain water, due to surface tension and capillary attraction, causing excessive overpressure when the weapon is fired. This requires the user to open the chamber while draining the barrel. However, the U.S. military provides a protective muzzle cap to keep water out of the M16s barrel.	Barrels larger than .25 caliber, such as those found on the AK-47 do not retain water and the water drains freely (even when loaded).
	The AK-47s receiver top-cover may fall off under rough handling or while firing. Also, the recoil impulse of launching 40 mm grenades from the GP-25 and GP-30 grenade launchers would cause the receiver top-cover to fly off. As a result, the newer AK-100 series have a "spring-loaded button at the top end of the recoil spring's guide rod (that) prevents the top cover from flying off into the Siberian sunset."
	The AK-47s exposed gas cylinder is easily dented by rough handling, sometimes causing malfunctions.
Variants
The M16 has variants with shortened barrels and adjustable telescoping buttstocks.	The AK-47 has variants with both standard and shortened barrels, and both under- and side-folding buttstocks.
M16 type rifles are currently made in 5.56×45mm NATO, 6.8×43mm SPC and .300 AAC Blackout caliber.	AK-47 type rifles are currently made in 7.62×39mm, 5.45×39mm and 5.56×45mm NATO.
The 7.62mm NATO SR-25 and M110 are based on the original AR-10, but feature additional refinements to maximize parts commonality with the M16.	Zastava Arms makes 7.62×51mm NATO, 7.62×54mmR and 7.92×57mm AK versions, and the IMI Galil is also made in 7.62mm NATO.
The M16 has a smaller 9mm, closed bolt, blowback operated, submachine gun version called the Colt SMG.	The AK-47 has smaller 9mm, submachine gun versions called the Vityaz-SN. and the Bizon
The M16 has an open-bolt light machine gun version called the Colt Automatic Rifle with a heavier barrel and integrated bipod. It has a distinctive squared shaped hand-guard with forward pistol grip and carrying handle. It can also use larger MWG 90-round "snail drum" and 100-round Beta C-mags.	The AK-47 has a widely used closed-bolt light machine gun version called the RPK with a stronger receiver, longer heavier barrel, an attached bipod and can use larger 40-round box and 75-round drum magazines.
The M16 has belt-fed light machine gun versions made by several manufactures, including the Ares Defense Shrike 5.56.	There are prototype belt-fed AK-47 variants such as PU-21, IP-2 and RPL-20.
The M16's lower receiver may also be mated with the AR-57 and .50 caliber bolt-action upper receivers.	
The M16 has 12 Gauge shotgun version; UTAS XTR-12 and .410 gauge shotgun versions; Safir T-14 and the ATI OMNI.<	The AK-47 has shotgun versions; the Saiga-12, Vepr-12 and KSK
Additional
The M16 has .22 caliber conversion kits.	The AK-47 has .22 caliber conversion kits.
The M16s sound level is: for shooter = 155 (dB); 1 m to side = 163 (dB); 10 m to side = 141 (dB)	The AK-47s sound level is: for shooter = 159 (dB); 1 m to side = 163 (dB); 10 m to side = 141 (dB)
The M16s sling is not only used to carry the rifle, but also to help support and stabilize the rifle while shooting, to allow for more accurate fire. "When the rifle sling is adjusted properly, it will provide maximum stability for the weapon and help reduce the effects of the rifle's recoil. There are three basic types of rifle sling adjustments: the loop sling, the hasty sling, and the three-point sling."	

== AK-74 vs M16A2 ==
"The AK-74 assault rifle was a Soviet answer to the US M16." The Russians realized that the M16 had better range and accuracy than the AKM and that its lighter cartridge allowed soldiers to carry more ammunition. Additionally, the smaller cartridge allowed for more controllable automatic fire and less muzzle rise. Therefore, in 1967, the USSR issued an official requirement to replace the AKM and the 7.62×39mm cartridge. They soon began to develop the AK-74 and the 5.45×39mm cartridge. AK-74 production began in 1974, and it was unveiled in 1977 when it was carried by Soviet parachute troops during the annual Red Square parade. It would soon replace the AKM and become the standard Soviet infantry rifle. In 1979, the AK-74 saw combat for the first time in Afghanistan.

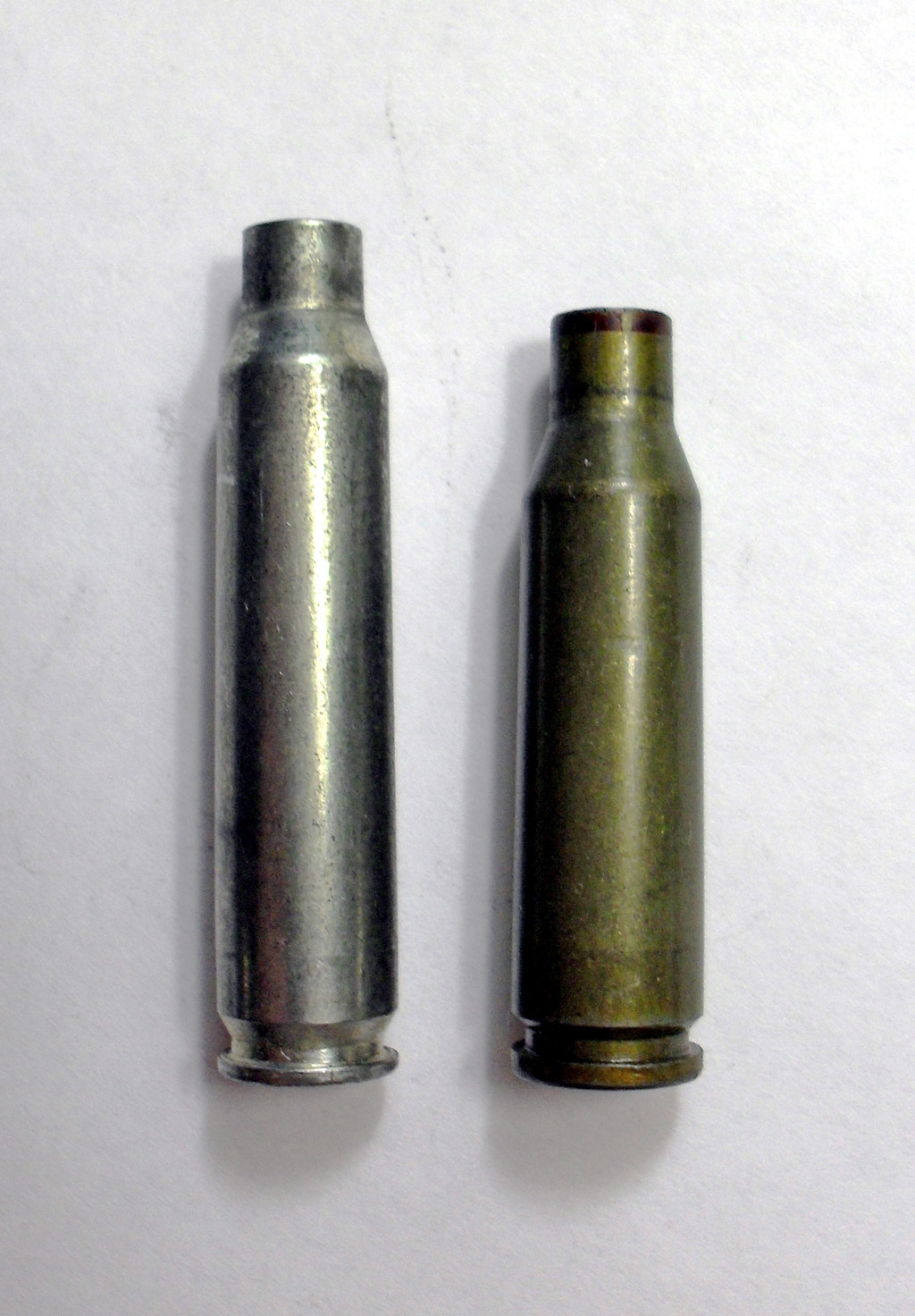
5.56mm NATO (left) and 5.45mm Russian (right) cases

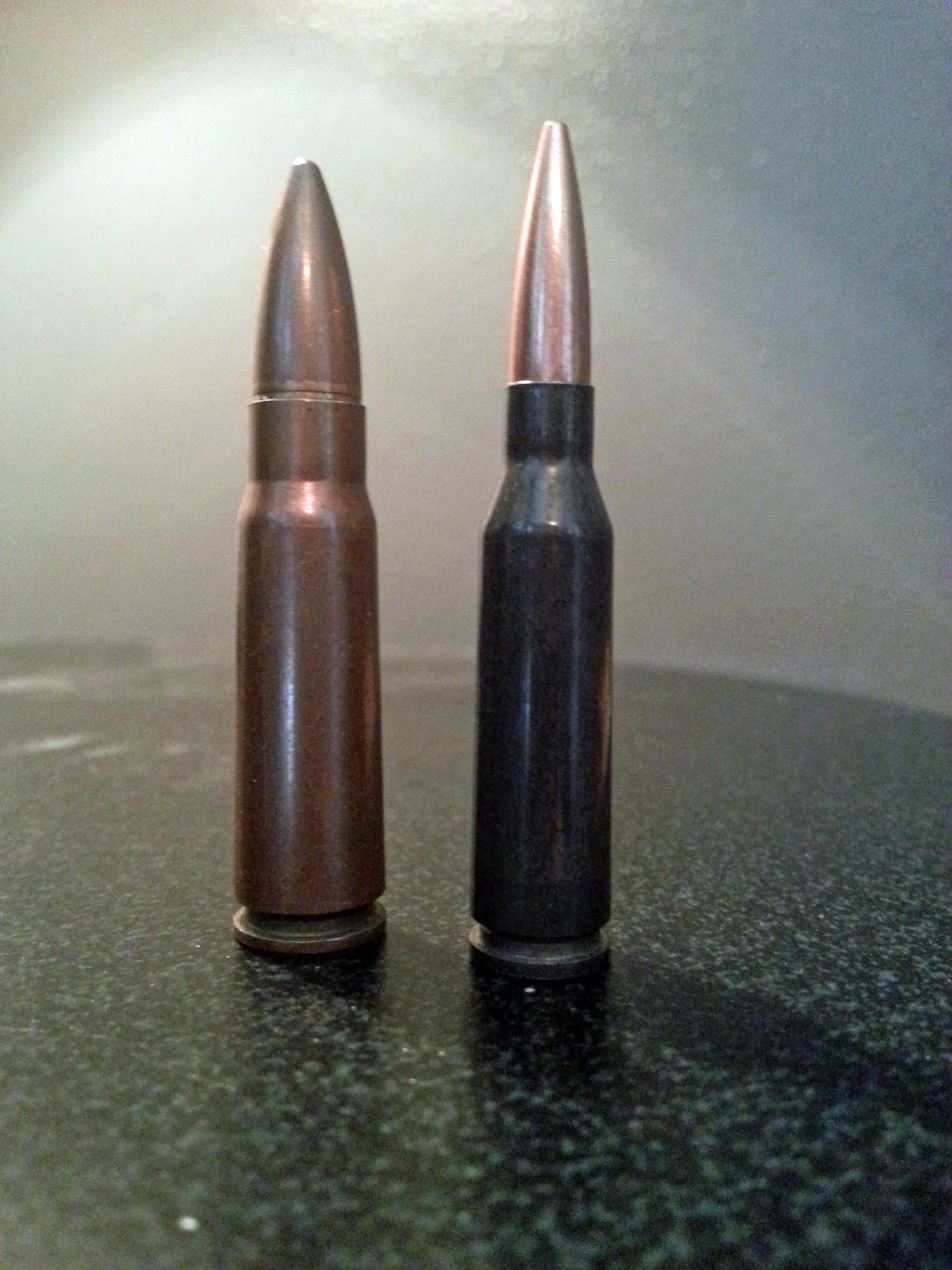
The 7.62×39mm and 5.45×39mm cartridges.

The AK-74 is a modified version of the 7.62×39mm AKM rifle. These modifications were primarily the result of converting the rifle to the 5.45×39mm cartridge. Some early models are reported to have been re-barreled AKMs. The AK-74 and AKM share 9 assemblies and 52 parts (36% & 53% parts commonality, respectively).

The 5.45×39mm cartridge is much lighter than the 7.62×39mm round that it replaced, allowing soldiers to carry 1.5 times more ammunition. The AK-74 also offers improved range and accuracy over the AKM. However, the AK-74's range and accuracy, according to one source, is still "superior to most Western weapons," including current issue M16-type rifles.

The 5.45 mm bullet tumbles in soft tissue, producing temporary cavities at a depth of 10 cm (3.9 in) and 35 cm (13.8 in). This effect is similar to, but more rapid than with 7.62×39mm cartridge. The 5.45mm round offers better penetration over the U.S. round. However, unlike its counterpart, the 5.45mm round "does not deform or fragment when striking soft tissues." Nevertheless, during the Afghan war, the Mujahedeen called the 5.45×39mm round the "Poison Bullet" due to the severe wounds it produced to extremities and the resulting need to amputate.

Available firepower comparison
Magazine	Weight of loaded 30-round magazine	Max. 10 kg (22 lb) ammunition load	Total available firepower
AK-74 steel-reinforced plastic magazine	551 g (1.215 lb)	18 magazines @ 9.92 kg (21.9 lb)	540 rounds
M16 aluminum magazine	490 g (1.08 lb)	20 magazines @ 9.80 kg (21.6 lb)	600 rounds

Ballistic & terminal ballistics comparison
Rifle	Caliber	Cartridge	Bullet weight	Velocity	Energy	Effective range	Accuracy Group/Hits*					Penetration Ballistic gelatin @ 10 meters
Rifle	Caliber	Cartridge	Bullet weight	Velocity	Energy	Effective range	20 shot group @ 100 yards	20 shot group @ 300 yards	20 shot group @ 600 yards	20 shot group @ 800 yards	10 shot group @ 1000 yards	Penetration Ballistic gelatin @ 10 meters
M16A2	5.56×45mm	SS109 / M855	62 gr (4.0 g)	3,100 fps (940 m/s)	1,303 ft/lbs (1776 J)	656 yd (600 m)	5.50 in 20×20	15.75 in 20×20	32.75 in 15×20	43.00 in 12×20	73.90 in 6×10	≈34 cm (13 in) (bullet fragments into smaller pieces)
AK-74	5.45×39mm	7N6 FMJ	53 gr (3.4 g)	2900 fps (880 m/s)	979 ft/lbs (1328 J)	547 yd (500 m)	7.25 in 20×20	21.60 in 17×20	44.00 in 9×20	74.50 in 7×20	No Hits	≈52 cm (20 in) (bullet does not fragment)

Notes *: Group = Extreme Spread of group...Hits = Hits on 39" high × 19" wide silhouette

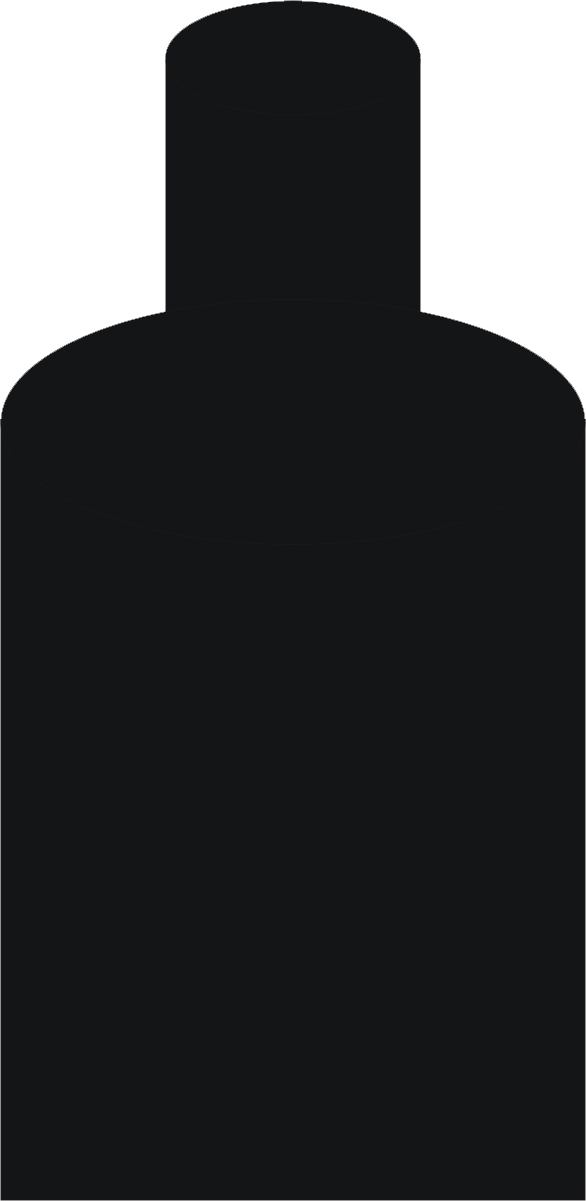
NATO E-type Silhouette Target

Single-shot hit-probability on Crouching Man (E-Silhouette) Target
Rifle	Caliber	Hit-probability (With no range estimation or aiming errors)								
Rifle	Caliber	50 meters	100 meters	200 meters	300 meters	400 meters	500 meters	600 meters	700 meters	800 meters
M16A2	5.56×45mm	100%	100%	100%	100%	98%	90%	79%	63%	43%
AK-74	5.45×39mm	100%	100%	100%	99%	93%	81%	66%	51%	34%

Wound profiles in ballistic gelatin
Note: images are not to same scale

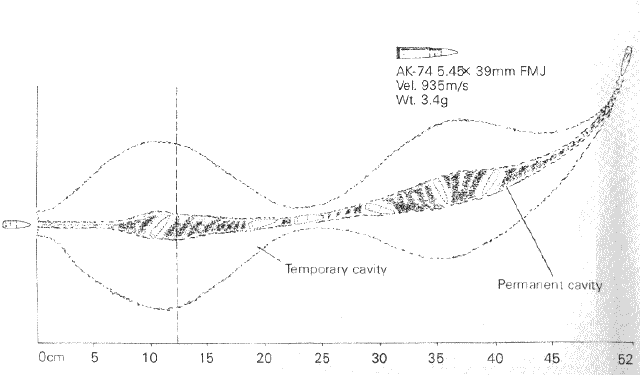
AK-74 5.45×39mm

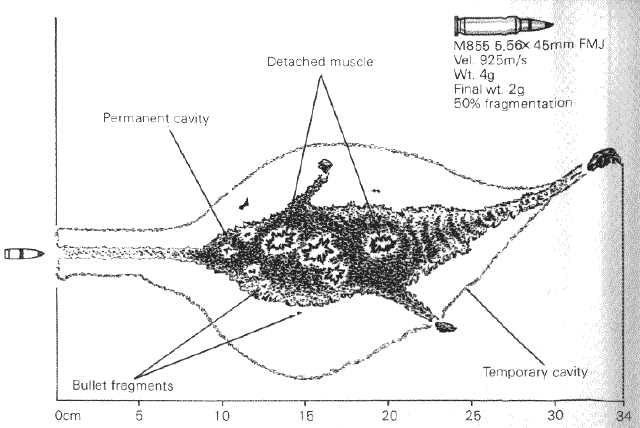
M16A2 5.56×45mm NATO

5.45×39mm cartridge dimensions

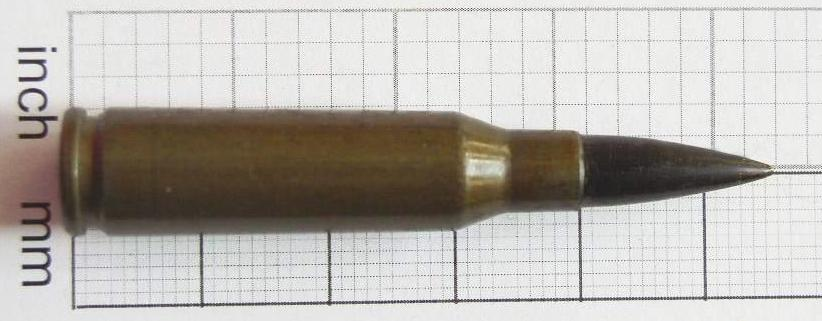
5.45×39mm, Soviet counterpart of 5.56mm NATO

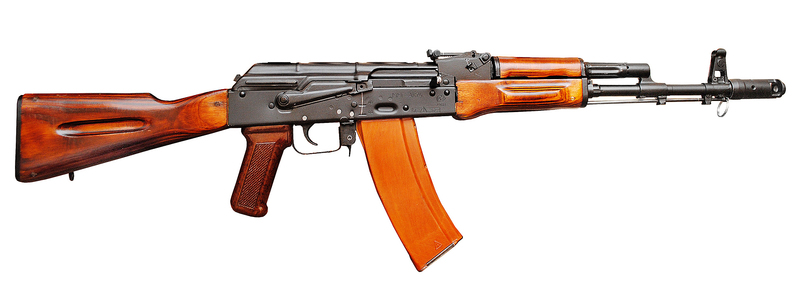
Early AK-74 assault rifle with rust-colored plastic magazine and laminated wood furniture

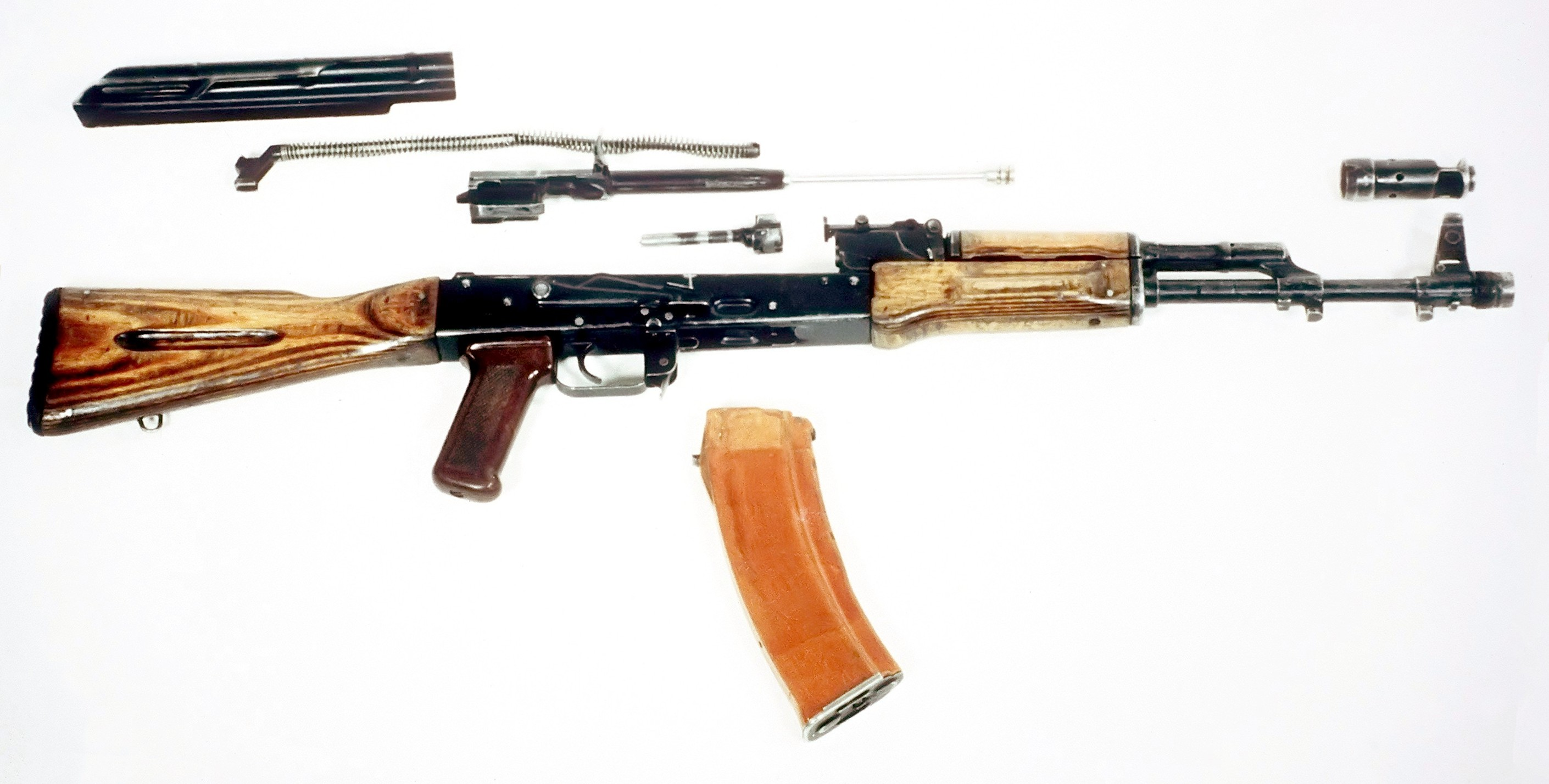
Field stripped AK-74

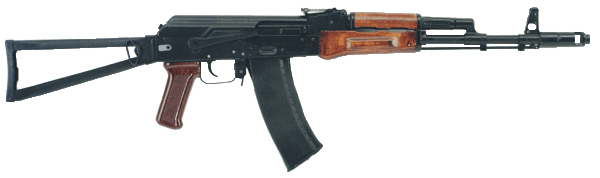
AKS-74 with stamped-steel triangular-shaped side-folding buttstock

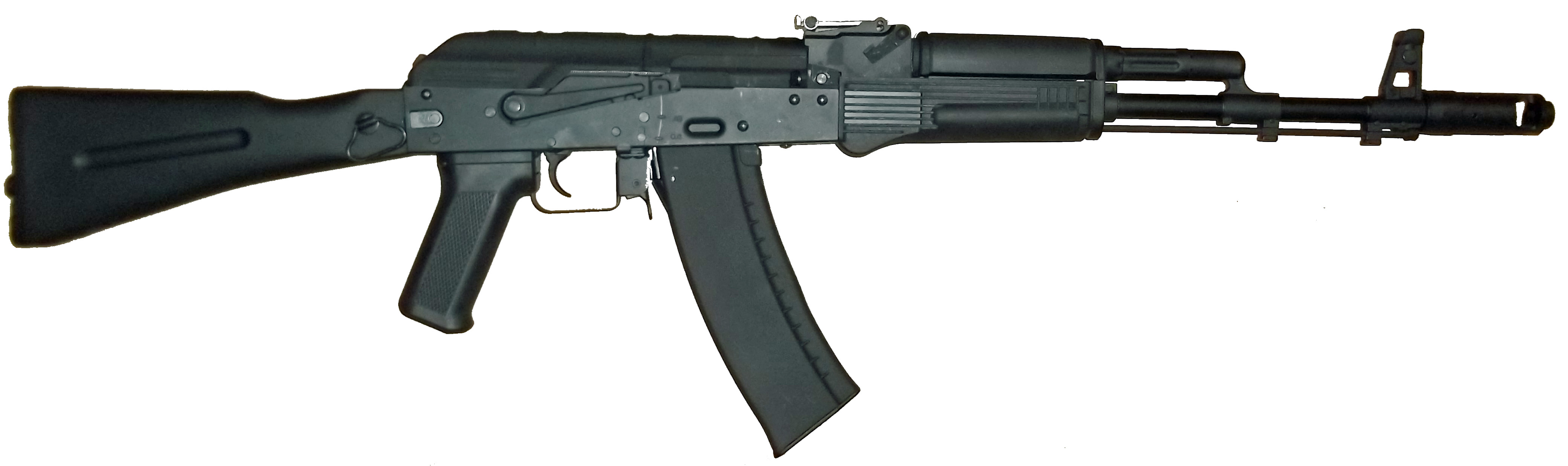
Current issue AK-74M with plastic furniture & side-folding buttstock

== Rifle evaluation study ==
The following Summary has been taken directly from the "Rifle Evaluation Study", United States Army, Combat Development Command, ADA046961, 20 Dec 1962. Additional information can be found in "Rifle Evaluation Study", United States Army, Infantry Combat Developments Agency, ADA050268, 8 Dec 1962".

Note: This is the first time that the United States Army compared the AR-15/M16 and the AK-47.

From Rifle Evaluation Study, United States Army, Combat Development Command, ADA046961, 20 Dec 1962.
Factor	AR-15/M16	M14	AK-47
Length	Superior	Acceptable	Superior
Weight	Superior	Acceptable	Acceptable
Weight with bipod	Superior	Unacceptable	None
Reliability	Unacceptable	Superior	Acceptable
Durability	Acceptable	Superior	Unknown
Maintenance	Acceptable	Acceptable	Acceptable
Position disclosure effect	Acceptable	Acceptable	Unacceptable
Grenade launching capability	Unacceptable	Unacceptable	None
Ease of handling	Superior	Acceptable	Superior
Provision for bayonet	Acceptable	Acceptable	Acceptable
Combat firing	Acceptable	Acceptable	Acceptable
Night firing capability	Unacceptable	Acceptable	Unknown
Ammo weight	Superior	Acceptable	Acceptable
Automatic rifle mode
0–100 m	Superior	Unacceptable	Superior
100–400 m	Superior	Unacceptable	Unacceptable
400–600 m	Acceptable	Unacceptable	Unacceptable
Semiautomatic fire
0–400 m	Superior	Acceptable	Unacceptable
400–600 m	Acceptable	Superior	Unacceptable
Penetration: Helmets
0–400 m	Acceptable	Superior	Acceptable
400–600 m	Unacceptable	Superior	Unacceptable
Penetration: Vests
0–400 m	Acceptable	Superior	Acceptable
400–600 m	Acceptable	Superior	Unacceptable

Night firing

The AR-15 was not equipped with any flash suppressor during the conduct of this test. Also, there was only a small amount of ammunition available for use in the AK-47. As a result, the night firing capability of both the AR-15 and AK-47 were not properly tested. In a subsequent test at Fort Benning an AR-15 equipped with a flash suppressor was tested against both the M14 and the AK-47. The AK-47 was not equipped with a flash suppressor.

From "Rifle Evaluation Study", United States Army Infantry Combat Developments Agency ADA050268, 8 Dec 1962
Method	Visual detection range (m)		
Method	AR-15/M16	M14	AK-47
Unaided eye	75–100	100–125	225–250
6×30 binoculars	200–225	225–250	350–375

== Worldwide usage ==
Worldwide usage

Kalashnikov–style rifles
Numbers made: ~100 million

AR-15–style rifles
Numbers made: ~28 million

== Further information ==
- "Tales of the gun: The AK-47", History Channel documentary
- "Tales of the gun: The M-16", History Channel documentary
- "Great Battles: AK-47 vs M16", Military Channel documentary
- Lewis, Jack (2007). The Gun Digest Book of Assault Weapons (7th ed.). Gun Digest Books. p. 256. ISBN 978-0-89689-498-3.
