= Aircrew Survival Egress Knife =

U.S. Army aircrew survival knife

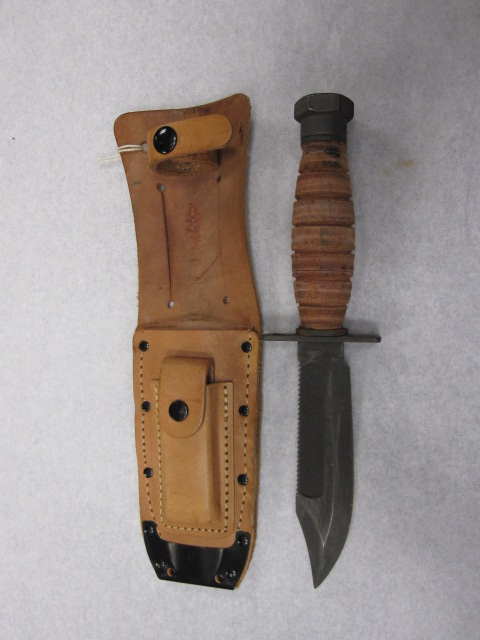
- Original Survival Knife developed in 1958
- Type: Combat knife
- Place of origin: United States

The Aircrew Survival Egress Knife (ASEK) is a U.S. Army aircrew survival knife, designed and initially manufactured by the Ontario Knife Company, and entered service in 2003.

== Features ==
ASEK

The ASEK has a number of features set by the United States Army Aviation Branch that aid in escaping an aircraft, such as the ability to be used as a hammer to break acrylic glass cockpit windows and cut through an aircraft's aluminium skin or electric cables. It may also be used as a screwdriver or precision edge marker.

The ASEK includes a crushed diamond disk sharpener and a separate blade for cutting through seatbelt webbing. The knife is 10.25 inches (26.0 cm) in length, the blade is 5 inches (13 cm) in length, .1875 inches (4.76 mm) thick and constructed from 1095 carbon steel.

Required features included:

- a point used to stab
- a hand guard
- durability
- light weight
- holes for tying the knife to a stick to act as a spear

During the initial evaluation, an electrically insulated handle was considered to be desirable but not mandatory.

The United States Army Aeromedical Research Lab (USAARL) considered the lack of insulated handle of the Ontario knife to be a catastrophic failure of the standard, and Ontario is redesigning their ASEK to meet this requirement.

== Variants ==
=== Gerber LMF II ASEK ===
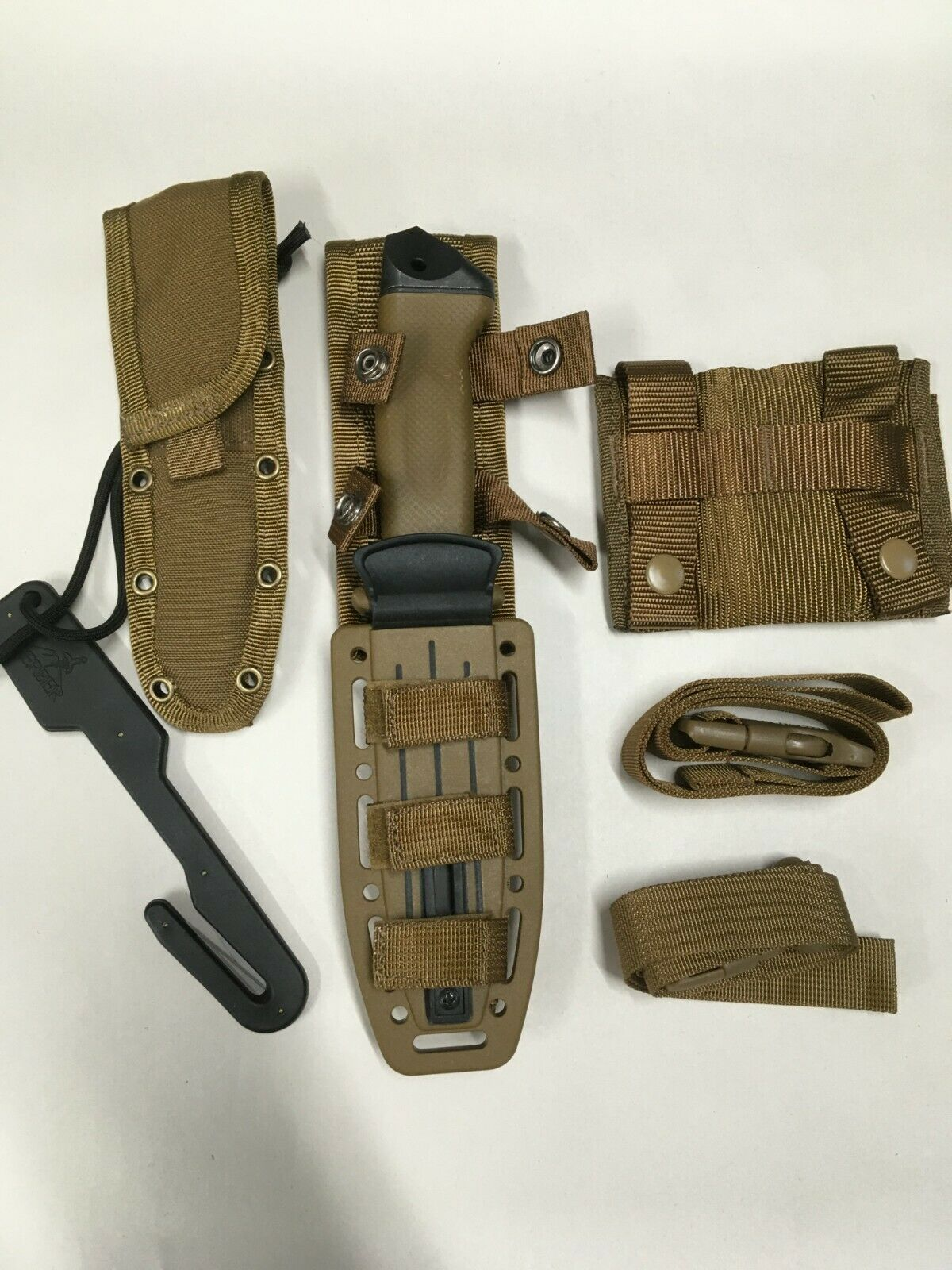

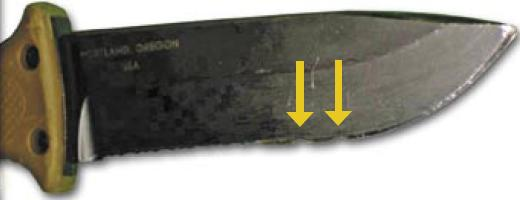
A Gerber LMF II ASEK used to sever a 220 volt line; arrows point to the damage done to the cutting edge by the current

In May 2005, Gerber Legendary Blades introduced its own ASEK-compliant knife (available commercially under the name LMF II) to the military for evaluation.

The Gerber ASEK met all requirements, and outperformed the Ontario model in the area of electrical insulation.

The Gerber ASEK has been approved for purchase, and Gerber released an additional version with a foliage green handle to match the Army Combat Uniform.

The knife also comes with a parachute cutter that has a separate sheath which can be attached to a MOLLE vest.

== Adoption ==
The ASEK replaced the "knife, hunting, survival pilots", which had a number of problems with the leather sheath and handle, the sharpening stone, and corrosion resistance.

The ASEK, made by Ontario, was adopted after trials by United States Army Natick Soldier Research, Development and Engineering Center in Natick, Massachusetts.

The US Army's Defense Supply Center purchased 11,881 Army ASEKs in 2004 and 2005 for equipping Aviation Life Support Equipment (ALSE) vests.

The 1958 designed knife is still issued by US military, and is currently made by Ontario Knife. It has not been fully replaced as of 2014.

== Users ==
- United States

== See also ==
- M6 aircrew survival weapon
- M9 bayonet
- Strider SMF
- SARK
- CQC-6
- Commander (knife)
- Mark 3 Knife
- OKC-3S Bayonet
- KA-BAR
- List of individual weapons of the U.S. armed forces
- List of weapons of the United States Marine Corps

== See also ==
- List of individual weapons of the U.S. Armed Forces
- M9 bayonet
- AB-0200
