= Akhbar =

Akhbar in Arabic (أخبار) is the plural of khabar (خبر), meaning news or, in Classical Arabic, reports about significant past events. The Arabic term occurs in the titles of many newspapers and other media, and may refer to:

== Journals ==
=== Middle East and North Africa ===
- Akhbar el-Yom, an Egyptian weekly newspaper, founded 1944
- Al-Akhbar (Egypt), an Egyptian daily, founded 1952
- Akhbar Al-Adab, an Egyptian literary weekly newspaper
- Al Akhbar (Lebanon), a Lebanese daily newspaper, founded 2006
- Akhbar Al Khaleej, a Bahrain daily newspaper
- Akhbar Al Arab, a daily newspaper published in the United Arab Emirates
- 'Akhbar ha-'Ir (lit., 'City Mouse'; also a pun on the Arabic term), an Israeli weekly entertainment guide

=== South Asia ===
- Akhbarul Hind, an Arabic-language fortnightly newspaper published in Mumbai, India
- Akhbar-e-Jahan, an Urdu-language weekly family magazine from Karachi, Pakistan
- Al Akhbar (Pakistan), an Urdu-language daily from Pakistan
- Khalsa Akhbar, a Punjabi-language weekly Sikh newspaper, published 1886–1905
- Koshur Akhbar, a Kashmiri-language online newspaper from Indian Jammu and Kashmir

== Other ==
- Akhbar (Shia Islam), in Shia Islam refers to the transmitting of hadith. It is the foundation of Akhbari Twelver Shia Islam
- Akhbari, Twelver Shī‘a Muslims who reject the use of reasoning in deriving verdicts
- Akhbar Ali, villain in the 1983 Indian film Andhaa Kanoon, played by Danny Denzongpa

== See also ==
- Akbar (disambiguation)
- Khabar (disambiguation)
