= Khabardar =

Khabardar may refer to:

- Khabardar (unreleased film), an unreleased Indian Hindi-language film by T. Rama Rao, starring Amitabh Bachchan and Kamal Haasan
- Khabardar (film), a 2006 Indian Marathi-language comedy film
- Khabardar (TV series), a news show on NDTV India
- Khabardaar, a Pakistani Urdu and Punjabi comedy television show

== See also ==
- Khabar (disambiguation)
