= Kabar (disambiguation) =

Kabars were Khalyzians, Turkic Khazar people who joined the Magyar confederation in the 9th century.

Kabar may refer to:

- Kabar (news agency), the official news agency of Kyrgyzstan
- Kabar (grape)
- Kabar, Yemen
- Kabar, Iran
- Ka-Bar a brand of knife

== See also ==
- Khabar (disambiguation)
- Kabard
