= Mark 3 Knife =

US-american field knife

Mark 3 knife
- Type: Combat knife
- Place of origin: United States

The Ontario Mark 3 Navy (MKIII) is an American combat knife designed and manufactured by the Ontario Knife Company.

== History ==
The Mark 3 was officially adopted by some units in the United States around 1970, and was also sold for general sale.

It wasn't till late 1982, that it was officially adopted as the "standard issue fighting/utility knife" for the Navy Seals.

It also was once and may still be, used by Reconnaissance Marines at the Combatant Divers Course in Panama City, Florida.

== Design ==
The Mark 3 features a fixed, 6.0 in (15 cm) 440 stainless steel blade.

The Mark 3 has a saw tooth back and a black oxide finish, with high impact plastic handle and sheath.

The original Mark 3 had a steep counter curved point which the Navy requested be reinforced because of damage to the tip of the blade when prying. They have since reinforced the tip eliminating the reverse curve making the point more sturdy.

People have found many uses for this knife, many of which are mentioned in marketing, including using the butt as a hammer, using the back serrated saw edge to cut, and using the thick blade as a prybar. The blade is said to hold a great edge and be very durable.

== Usage ==
As of 2025, it is unclear if the knife was ever replaced, or instead Navy Seals are allowed to pick their own knives.

== Users ==
- Hong Kong
  - Hong Kong Police Force
    - Special Duties Unit
    - Counter Terrorism Response Unit
- United States

== See also ==
- M9 bayonet
- Strider SMF
- SARK
- CQC-6
- Commander (knife)
- Aircrew Survival Egress Knife
- OKC-3S Bayonet
- KA-BAR
- Glock knife
- 6KH2 bayonet
- 6KH3 bayonet
- 6KH4 bayonet
- 6KH5 bayonet
- 6KH9 bayonet
