= USMC Sword Manual Procedures =

USMC Model 1859 NCO Sword
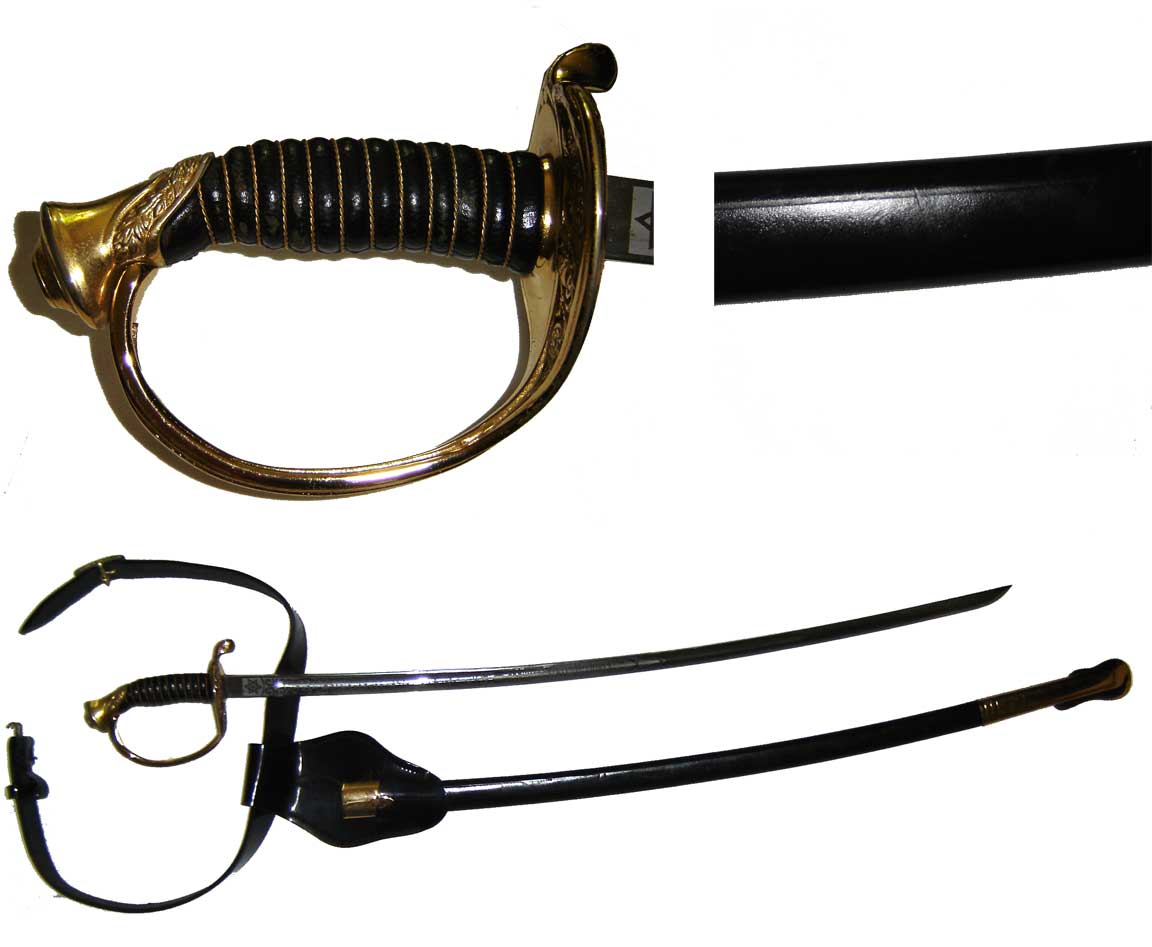
- Type: Sword
- Place of origin: United States

Service history
- In service: 1859–present
- Used by: United States Marine Corps non-commissioned officers
- Wars: Mid-19th and early-20th centuries

Production history
- Designer: Modeled on U.S. Army M1850 foot officers’ sword
- Designed: Introduced 1859, notable design changes 1875, 1918
- Manufacturer: Horstmann, Ames, various others
- Produced: 1859–present
- No. built: Undetermined
- Variants: Unetched blades until 1875, wide blades until 1918

Specifications
- Length: 34–36 in (860–910 mm) commonly
- Blade length: 28–30 in (710–760 mm) commonly
- Blade type: Saber, slightly curved, single-edged with false edge, made from various carbon steels, modern versions made from stainless steel
- Hilt type: Cast-brass hilt, leather-wrapped grip
- Scabbard/sheath: Black leather scabbard, two brass mounts, frog stud

USMC Sword Manual Procedures are commonly used in the Marine Corps. Marines considered Non-commissioned Officers (NCO) as well as Staff Non-Commissioned Officers (SNCO) may find themselves having to perform the "Sword Manual", which is a stationary drill.

== Description ==
Most Marines that fall under the category of NCO or SNCO will be mandated to take a leadership course. Part of these courses require Marines to complete multiple drills. One of those drills is the Sword Manual.

- NCOs
  - take Corporal's Course
  - take Sergeants Course
- SNCOs
  - take SNCO Academy
  - take SNCO Academy

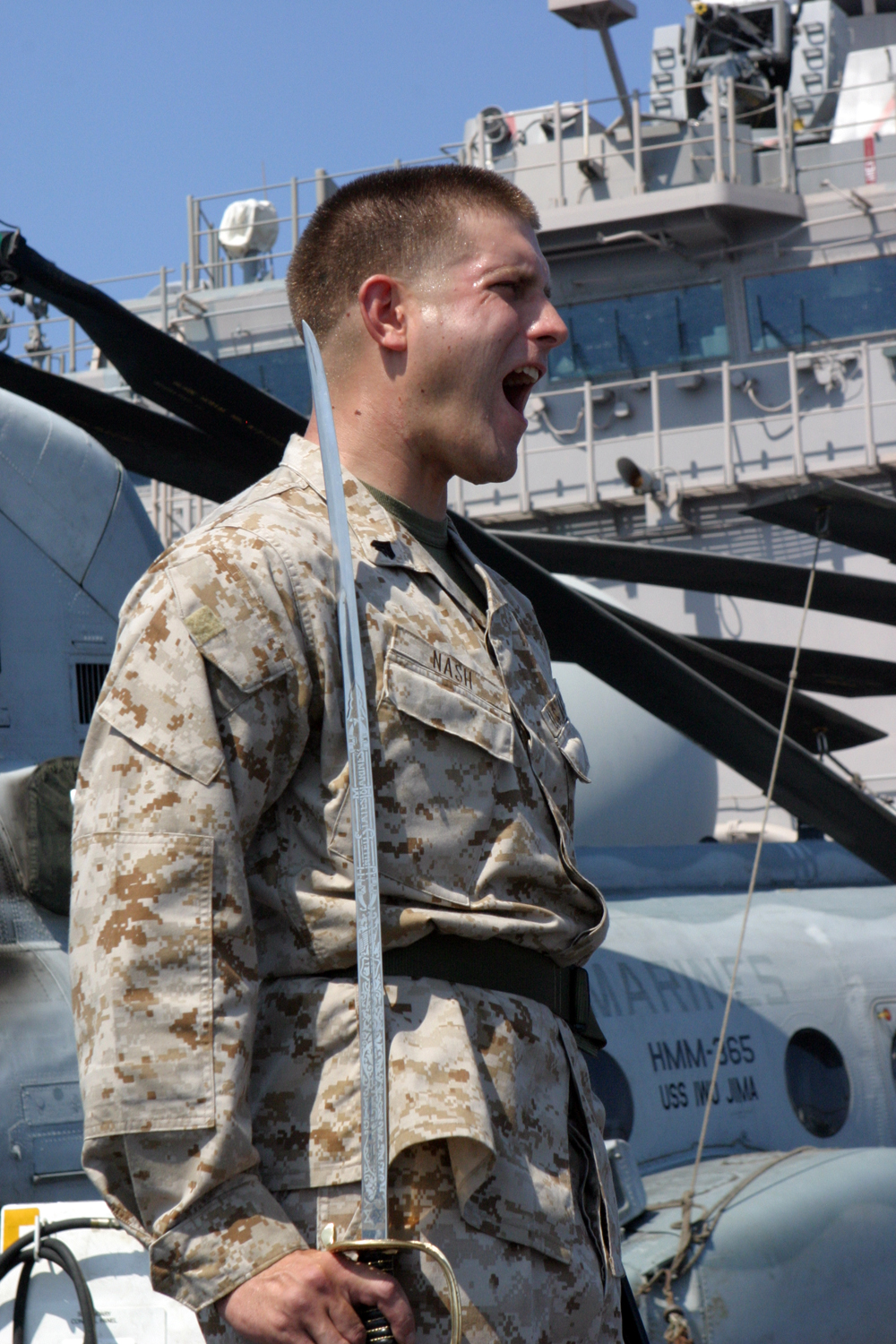
Marine using an NCO Sword with the MCCUU.

== Sword Manual Procedures ==
- Draw sword
  - Command: "Draw, sword"
  - On the preparatory command: "Draw"
1. Grip the scabbard just below the frog with the left hand. Tilt it forward to form an angle of 45 degrees with the deck. At the same time, reach across the front of the body and grasp the sword grip with the right hand; draw the sword about 10 inches from the scabbard until the right wrist and forearm are straight and parallel to the deck. The left hand holds the scabbard against the side.
  - On the command of execution : "Sword"
1. Draw the sword smartly, raising the right arm to its full extent, directly to the front at an angle of about 45 degrees, the sword in a straight line with the arm, true edge down; drop the left hand to the side.
  1. Pause for one count.
    1. Bring the false edge of the blade against the shoulder seam, blade vertical, back of the grip to the rear, and the arm nearly extended. The right thumb and forefinger embrace the lower part of the grip, with the thumb against the trouser seam, and the remaining fingers joined in a natural curl behind the end of the hilt as if holding a pen or pencil. This is the position of carry sword.
- Present sword from carry or order sword
- Order sword from present sword
- Carry sword from order sword or present sword
- Eyes right (left) from carry or order sword
- Parade rest from order sword
- At ease from any position of the sword
- Rest from any position of the sword
- Return to Attention
- Return sword from carry or order sword

== See also ==
- U.S. Marine Corps swords
- U.S. regulation swords

== Bibliography ==
- NAVMC 2691, Marine Corps Drill and Ceremonies Manual, January 1999
