= List of weapons of the United States Marine Corps =

Weaponry used by the U.S. Marine Corps

This is a list of weapons used by the United States Marine Corps:

== Weapons used ==
The basic infantry weapon of the United States Marine Corps is the M27 Infantry Automatic Rifle. Suppressive fire is provided by the M240B machine gun, at the squad and company levels respectively. In addition, indirect fire is provided by the M320 grenade launcher in fireteams, M224A1 60 mm mortar in companies, and M252 81 mm mortar in battalions. The M2 .50 caliber heavy machine gun and MK19 automatic grenade launcher (40 mm) are available for use by dismounted infantry, though they are more commonly vehicle-mounted (same thing with the Ruger M77). Precision fire is provided by the M110 Semi-Automatic Sniper System and M40A3, A5, A6 bolt-action sniper rifle.

The Marine Corps uses a variety of direct-fire rockets and missiles to provide infantry with an offensive and defensive anti-armor capability. The SMAW and AT4 are unguided rockets that can destroy armor and fixed defenses (e.g. bunkers) at ranges up to 500 meters. The FGM-148 Javelin and BGM-71 TOW are anti-tank guided missiles; both can utilize top-attack profiles to avoid heavy frontal armor and are heavy missiles effective past 2,000 meters that give infantry an offensive capability against armor.

Marines are capable of deploying non-lethal weaponry as the situation dictates. Part of a Marine Expeditionary Unit earning the Special Operations Capable designator requires a company-sized unit capable of riot control.

Some older weapons are used for ceremonial purposes, such as the Silent Drill Platoon's M1 Garands, or the use of the M101 howitzer for gun salutes.

== Active use ==
=== Non-lethal weapons ===
- CS gas
- OC spray
- Rubber, beanbag, & plastic bullet
- Riot shield
- Baton
- M6/M7 series chemical grenade
- M84 stun grenade
- Sting grenade

=== Bladed weapons ===
- United States Marine Raider stiletto
- OKC-3S bayonet
- Ka-Bar Combat Knife
- Marine NCO sword
- Marine Officers' Mameluke Sword
- Original United States Marine Corps Machete

=== Handguns ===
- Glock M007 – Adopted in February 2015 for use by MARSOC
- M18 – Standard issue pistol since 2020 (replacing M9, M9A1, M45A1 and M007)

=== Assault rifles, carbines and battle rifles ===
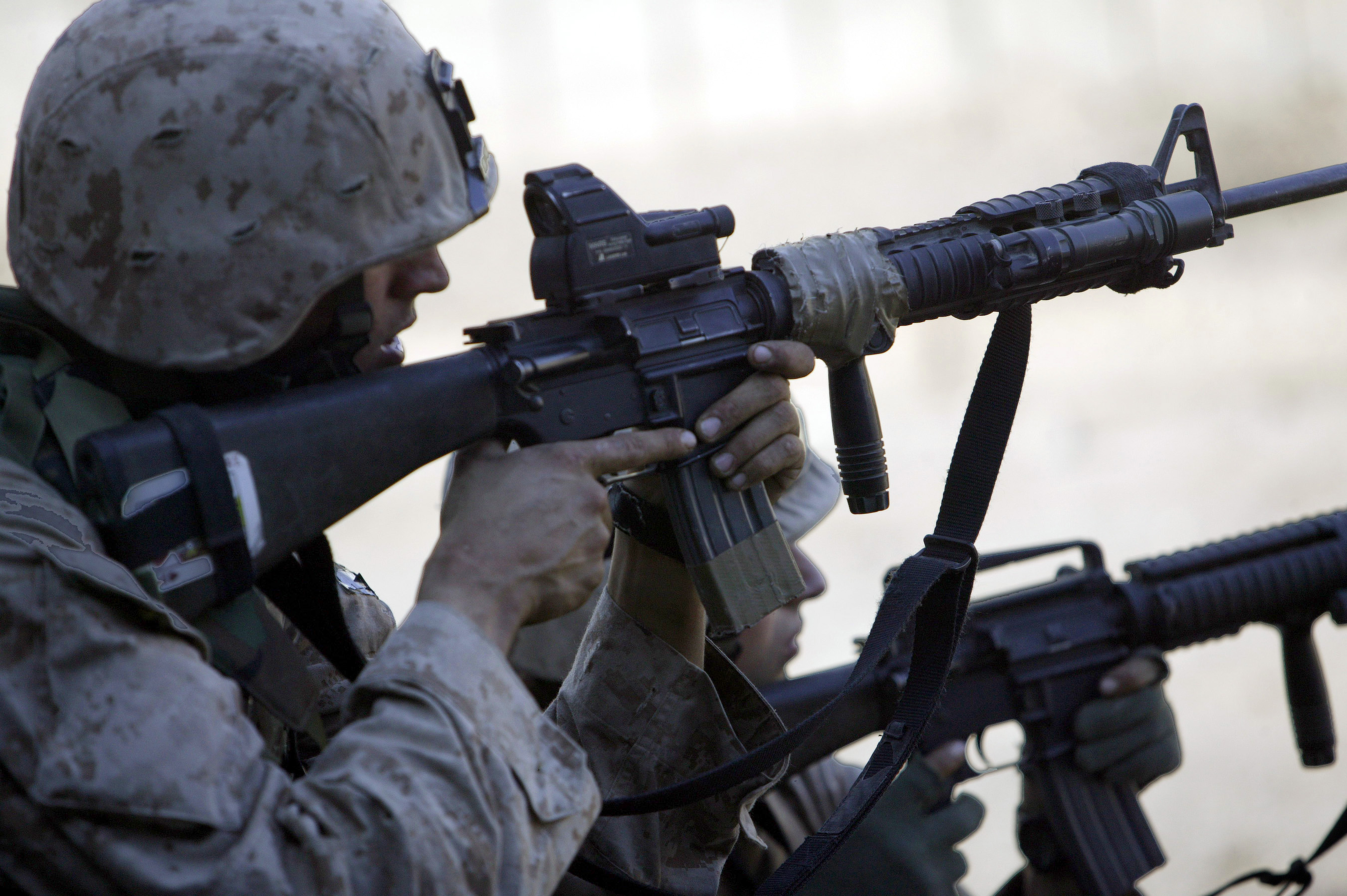
A U.S. Marine armed with an M16A4 rifle and ITL MARS sight in 2004.

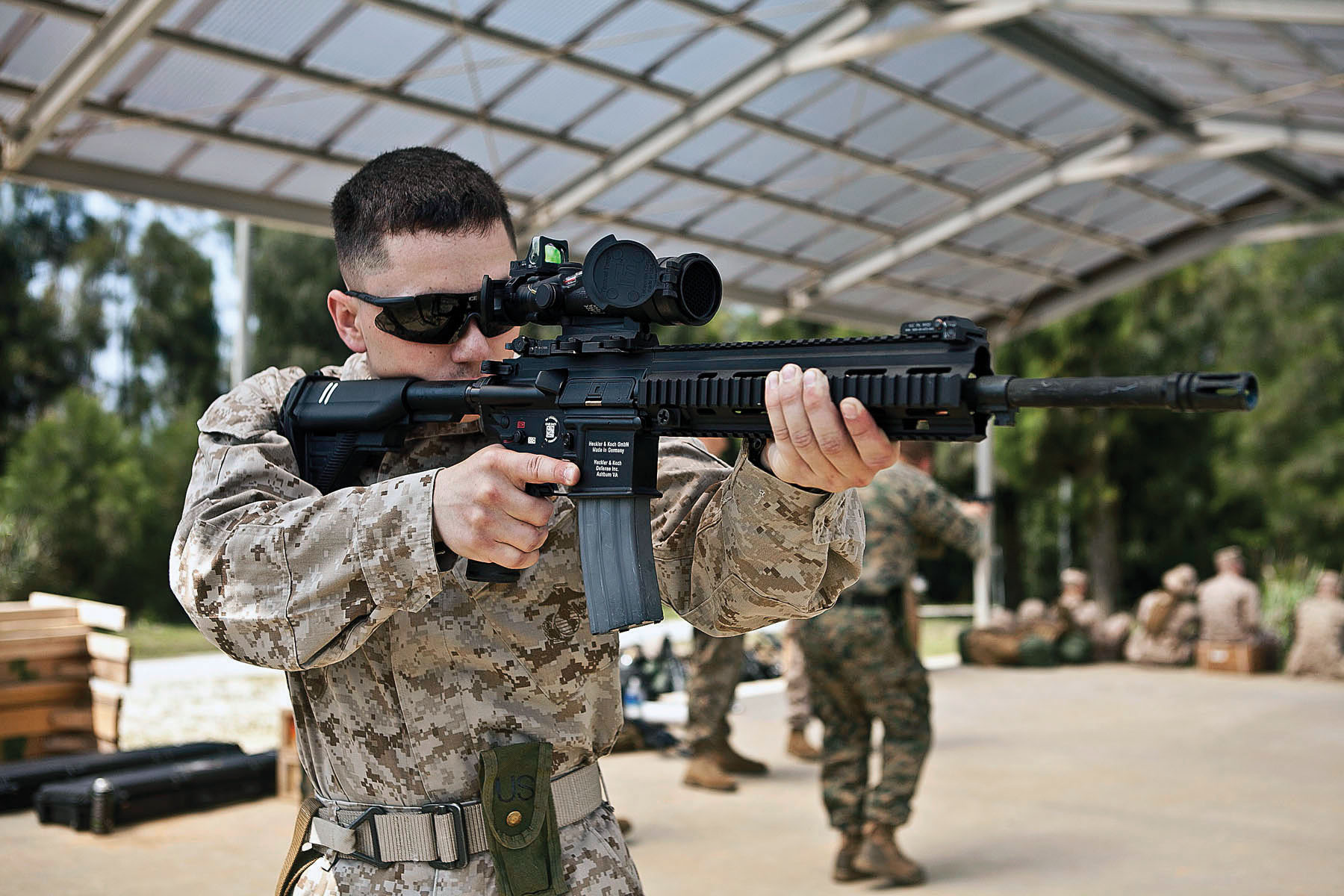
A U.S. Marine armed with an M27 IAR affixed with ACOG Squad Day Optic.

- M16A4 – Select fire. Safe, semi, burst. Originally the basic infantry weapon, mostly being replaced by M27 in infantry battalions. Primary used by non-infantry personnel.
- M4/M4A1 – Mostly being replaced by M27 in infantry battalions. Commonly issued for non-infantry marines as of 2010.
- M27 Infantry Automatic Rifle – Support weapon based on the Heckler & Koch HK416 (itself a piston-driven variation upon the M4 carbine using a free-floating barrel). Initially issued as a replacement for the M249, in 2018 the decision was made to adopt the M27 as the standard USMC assault rifle in infantry battalions.
- CQBR Block II – Modified M4 with 10.3-inch barrel. Used by MARSOC
- Mk 17 Mod 0 used by MARSOC
- M38 Designated Marksman Rifle – Modified M27 IAR fielded as a marksman rifle
- URGI - Modified M4 with 10.3- and 14.5-inch barrel used by MARSOC

=== Sniper rifles ===
- Mk 13 mod 7 – .300 Winchester Magnum chambered sniper rifle built on Accuracy International Chassis System with Remington 700 long action.
- M110 Semi-Automatic Sniper System – Improved version of the Mk 11, replacing the M39 and Mk 11.
- Barrett 50 Cal/M82/M107 – in use as the M82A3 and M107 variants. The M82A3 being an upgraded M82A1A, and the M107 being a variant made in response to requirements issued for an anti-materiel rifle.
- Barrett MK22 - US Marines new standard precision rifle.

=== Shotguns ===
- Remington 870 – as the M870 (by Marine Security Guards) and Modular Combat Shotgun.
- Benelli M1014 – semi automatic 12-gauge shotgun.
- Mossberg 590A1 12-gauge pump

=== Machine guns ===
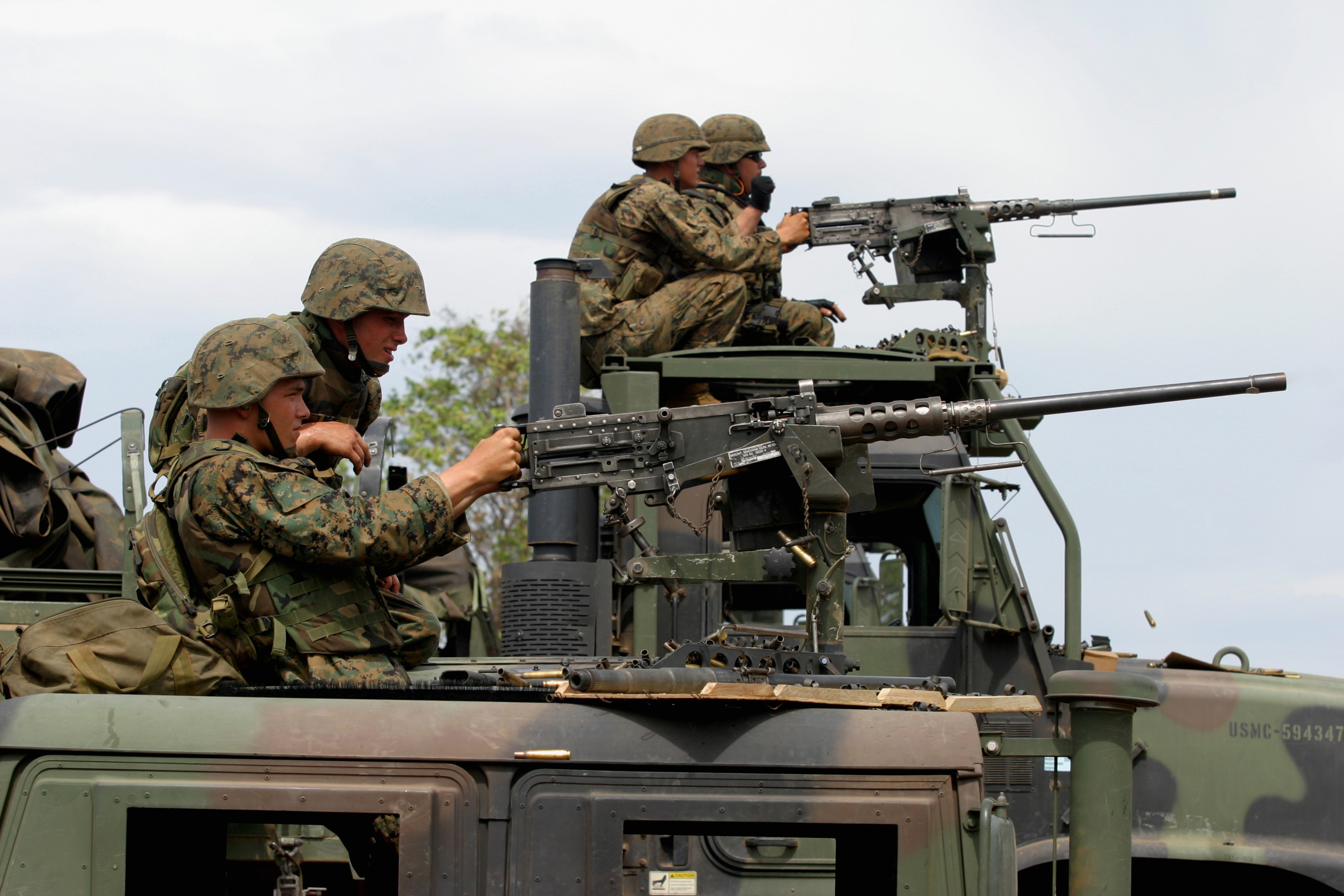
Vehicle-mounted M2 .50 caliber machine guns in May 2005.

- M2HB – heavy machine gun chambered in .50 BMG used primarily on vehicles.
- M240B – 7.62×51mm medium machine gun used by infantry, and light vehicles and helicopters.
- Mk48 Mod 1 – 7.62×51mm light machine gun, used by US MARSOC.
- M249E4 – 5.56×45mm light machine gun, infantry support weapon. Not replaced, but being supplanted by the M27 IAR.

=== Hand grenades ===
- M67 Hand Grenade (Fragmentation)
- Mk 21 Mod 0 Scalable Offensive Hand Grenade
- AN-M14 Hand Grenade (Incendiary)
- Mk 141 Mod 0 Hand Grenade "flash-bang"
- AN-M18 Smoke grenade

=== Grenade launchers ===
A Video of U.S. Marines training with the M32A1

- M203A1/A2 40 mm Rifle-Mounted Grenade Launcher
- M320 Grenade Launcher Module
- M32 MGL 40mm 6 shot Revolver type Grenade Launcher
- MK19 40 mm Automatic Grenade Launcher

=== Mortars ===
- M224 60 mm Mortar
- M252 81 mm Extended Range Mortar
- M327 120 mm Expeditionary Fire Support System

=== Artillery ===
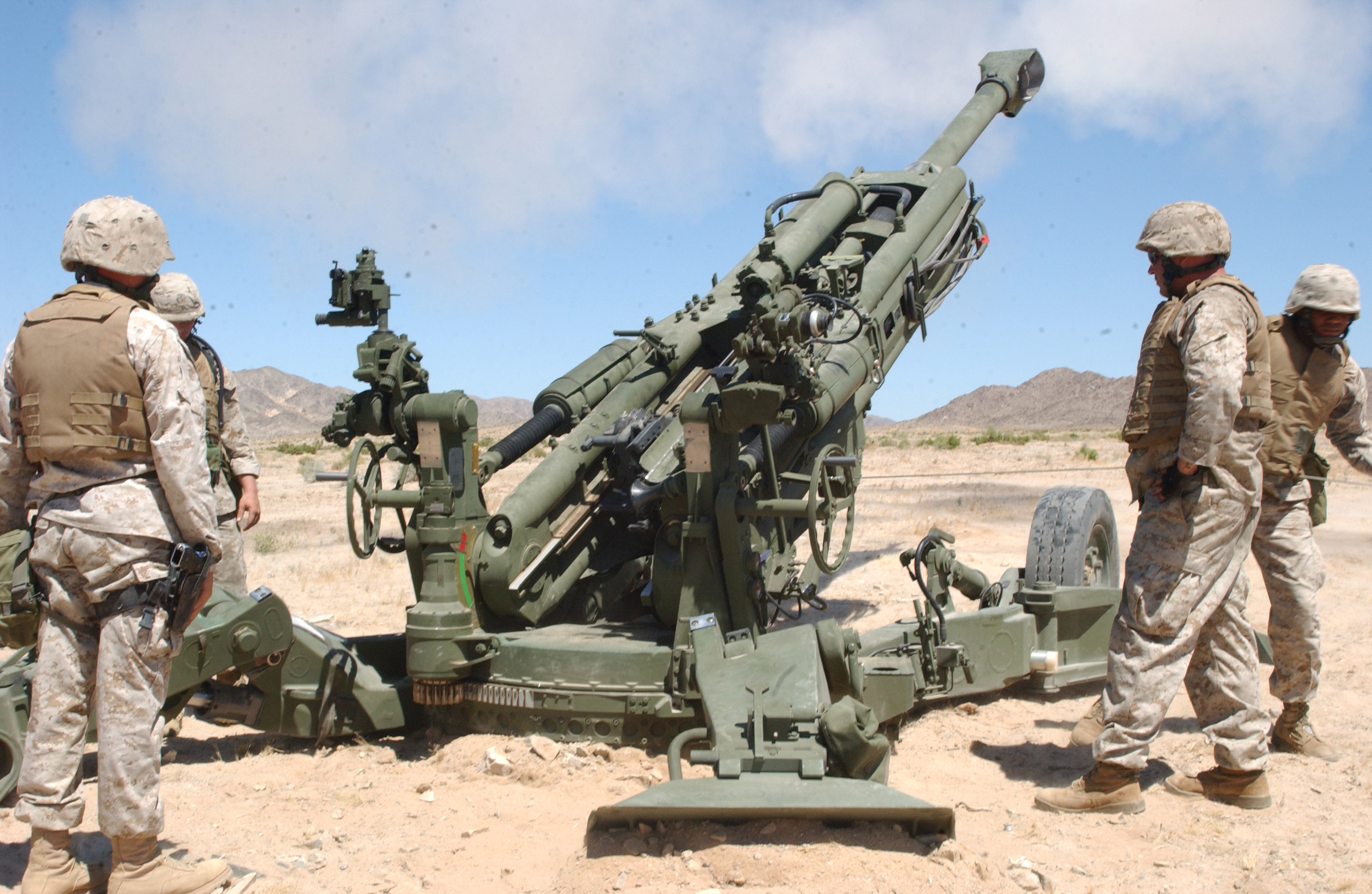
M777 155 mm howitzer

- M777 155 mm lightweight howitzer
- High Mobility Artillery Rocket System (HIMARS)

=== Shoulder-fired missile and rocket launchers ===
- M72 LAW
- M136 AT4 Anti-Tank Weapon
- MK153 Shoulder-launched Multipurpose Assault Weapon (SMAW)
- M3A1 Multi-Role Anti-Armor Anti-Personnel Weapon System (MAAWS)
- FGM-148 Javelin Anti-Tank missile
- BGM-71 Tube Launched, Optically Tracked, Wire Guided (TOW) Missile Weapon System
- FIM-92 Stinger anti-aircraft missile

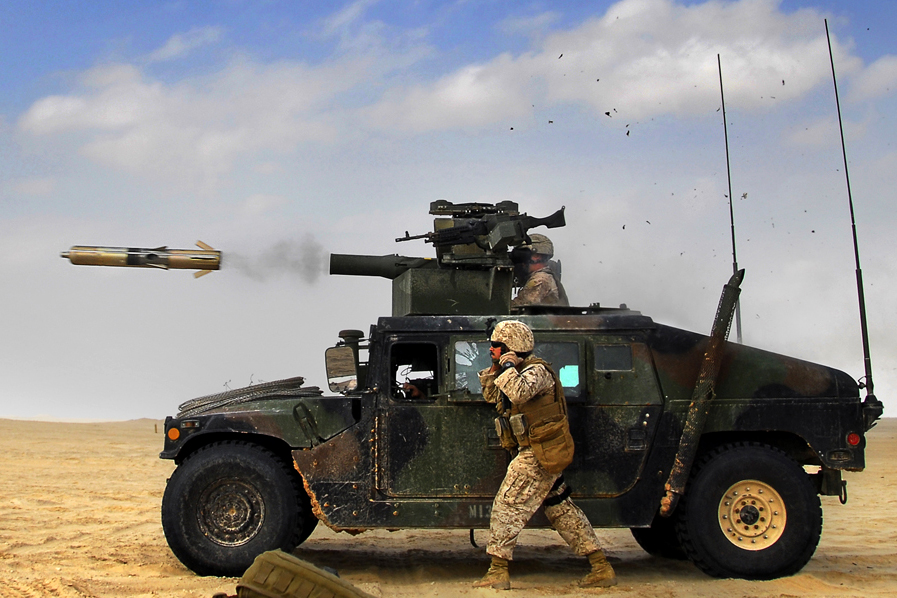
HMMWV-mounted BGM-71 TOW

=== Vehicle-mounted weapons ===
- M240G 7.62 mm medium machine gun
- M2 .50 caliber machine gun
- M48 turret-type .50 caliber machine gun
- MK19 40 mm grenade machine gun
- BGM-71 tube-launched, optically tracked, wire-guided (TOW) missile weapon system
- M242 Bushmaster 25 mm autocannon

=== Aircraft-mounted weapons ===
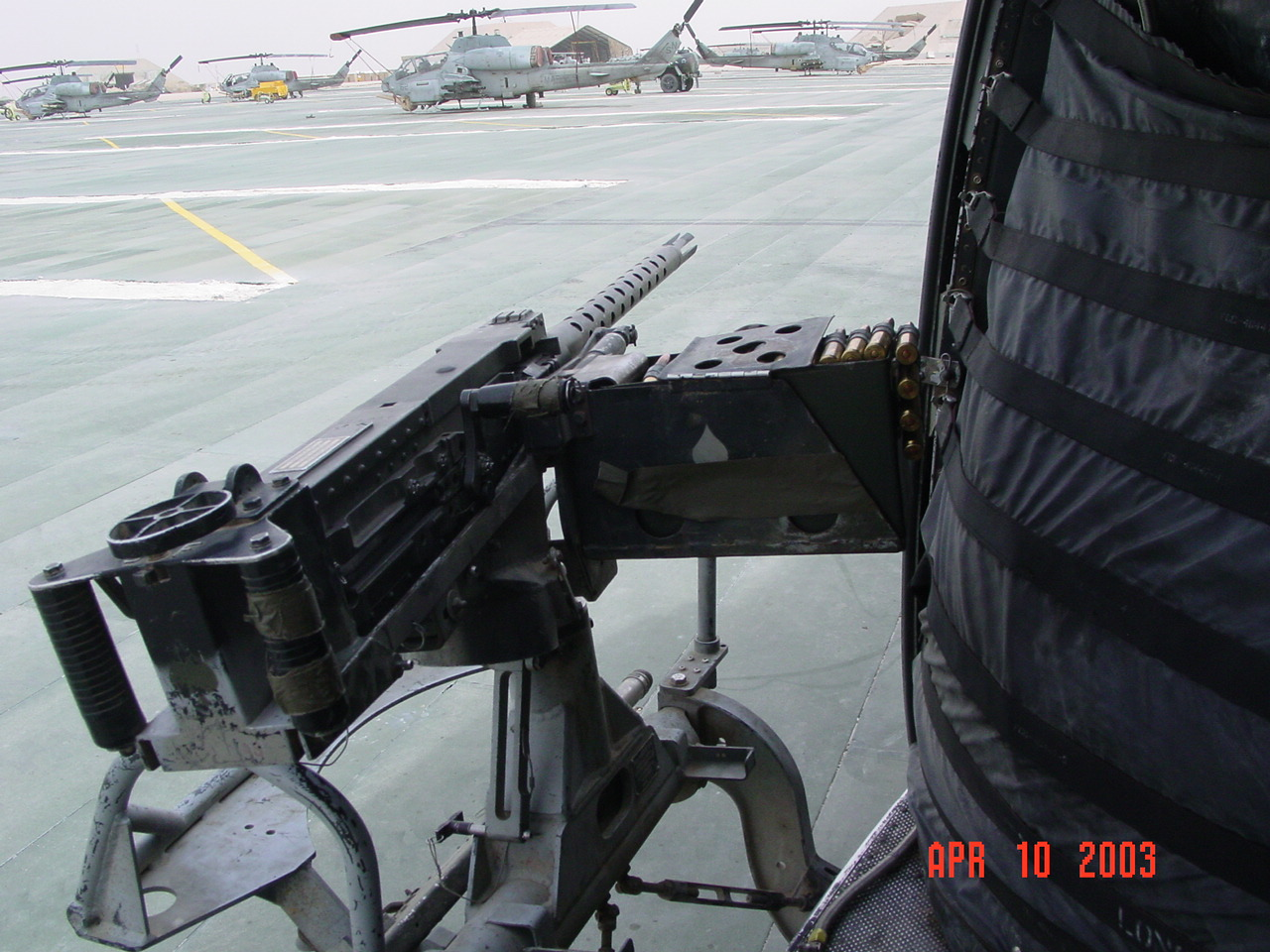
UH-1N with GAU-16/A door-mounted machine gun

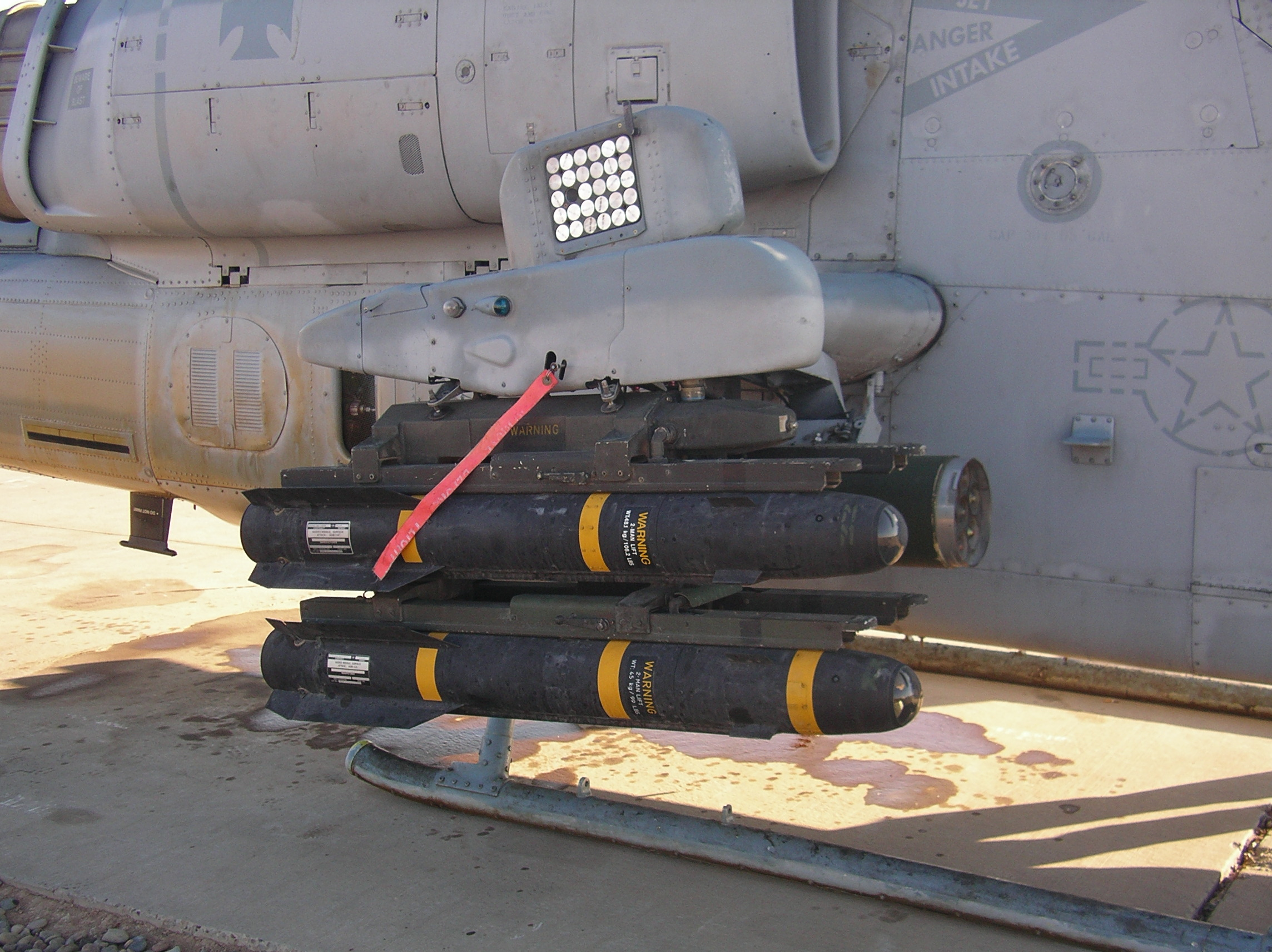
AH-1W with AGM-114 Hellfire missiles and Hydra 70 rockets

GBU-12 500lb. bomb

Guns

- GAU-12/U 25 mm Gatling gun
- GAU-16/A .50 Caliber Machine gun
- GAU-17/A 7.62 mm automatic gun
- GAU-21/A .50 Caliber Machine gun
- GAU-8/A Avenger 30mm Gatling cannon
- M61A1 20 mm automatic cannon
- M197 20 mm automatic cannon

Bombs

- CBU-99 Cluster Bomb
- GBU-10 2000 lb laser-guided bomb
- GBU-12 500 lb laser-guided bomb
- GBU-16 1000 lb laser-guided bomb
- MK82 series 500 lb bomb
- MK83 series 1000 lb bomb
- MK84 series 2000 lb bomb
- Mk 77 incendiary bomb
- GBU-31
- GBU-32
- GBU-38
- GBU-39
- GBU-53
- GBU-54

Missiles

- Naval Strike Missile
- AGM-65 Maverick
- AGM-84 Harpoon
- AGM-88 HARM
- AGM-114 Hellfire
- AGM-154 Joint Standoff Weapon
- AIM-7 Sparrow
- AIM-9 Sidewinder
- AIM-120 AMRAAM
- Hydra 70
- M260 70 mm Rocket Launcher
- Advanced Precision Kill Weapon System

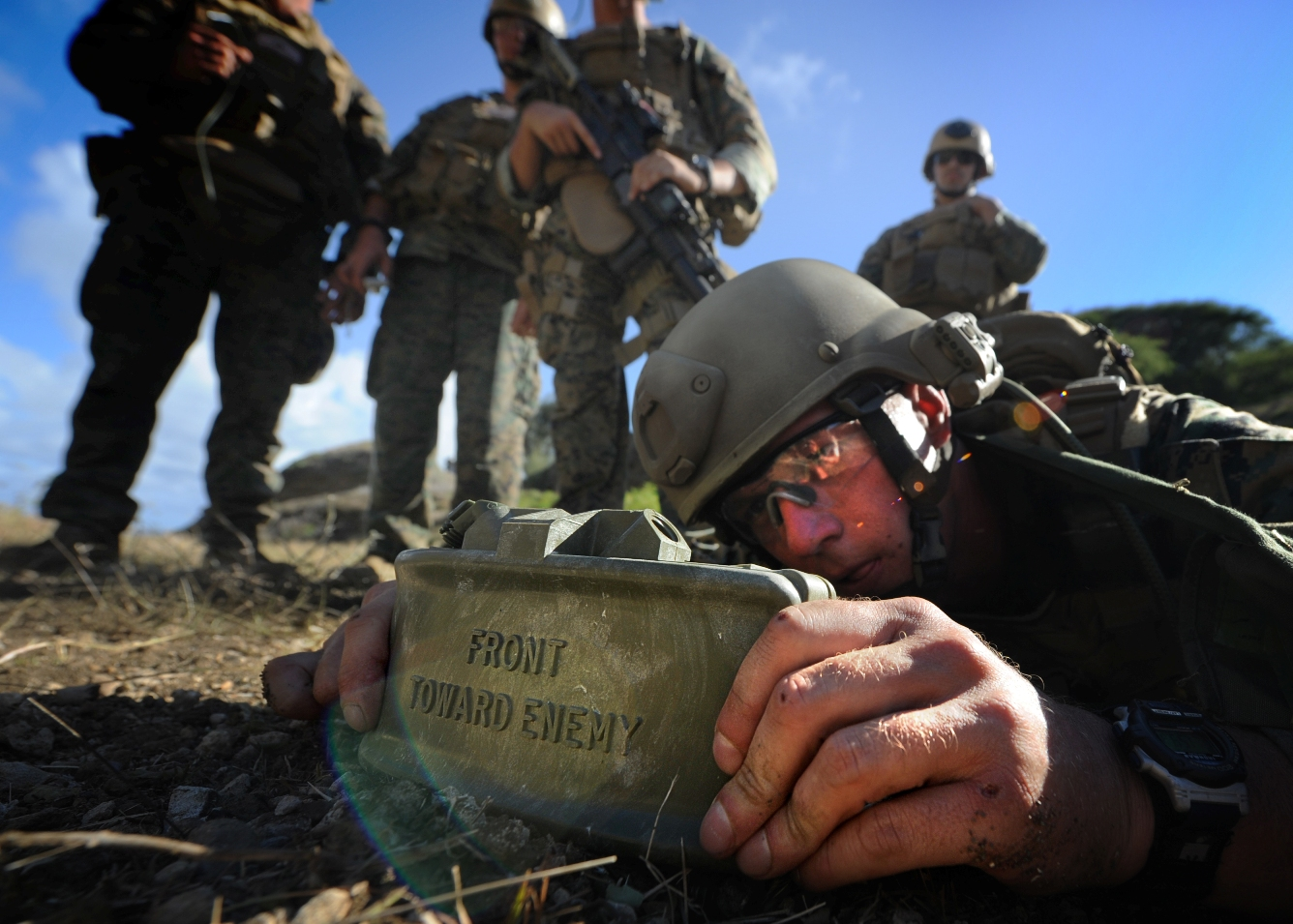
Marine emplaces a claymore mine

=== Other ===
- M18A1 Claymore anti-personnel mine
- M15 anti-tank mine
- M19 anti-tank mine
- M21 anti-tank mine
- M58 Mine Clearing Line Charge (MICLIC)

=== Accessories ===
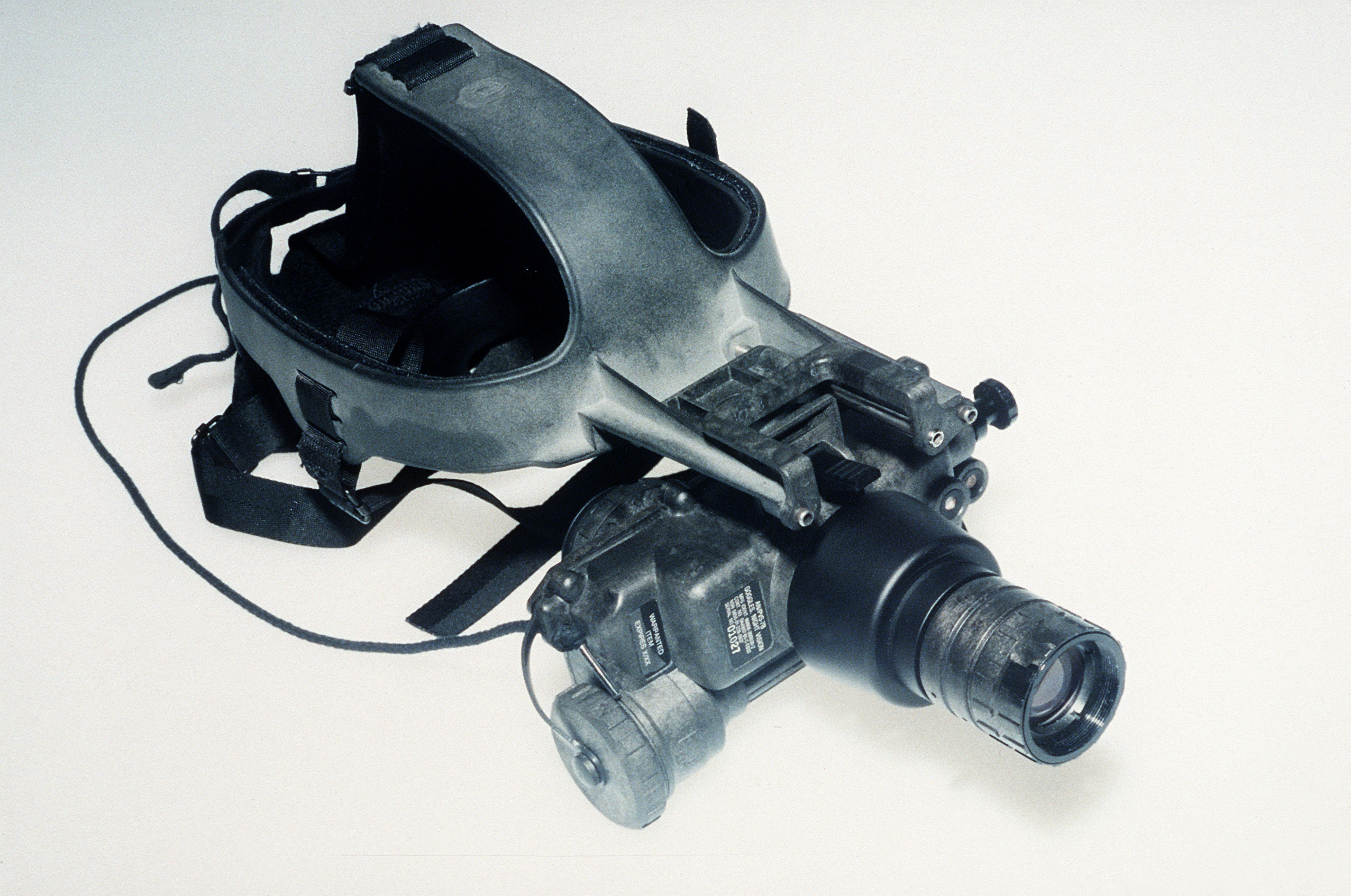
AN/PVS-7A

- Advanced Combat Optical Gunsight (ACOG), recently renamed Rifle Combat Optic (RCO)
- ITL MARS reflex sight
- AN/PSQ-18 day/night grenade launcher sight
- AN/PVS-7A Passive/Active night vision device
- AN/PVS-10 night vision sight
- AN/PVS-14 night vision sight
- AN/PVS-17 night vision sight
- AN/PVS-21 night vision sight
- AN/PVS-31 night vision sight
- AN/PAS-13 thermal sight
- AN/PAQ-4 IR laser sight
- AN/PEQ-15 IR laser sight
- Knights Armament Company QDSS NT4 suppressor
- various tactical lights
- M2 tripod for light and medium machine guns
- M122 tripod for light and medium machine guns
- M3 tripod for heavy machine guns

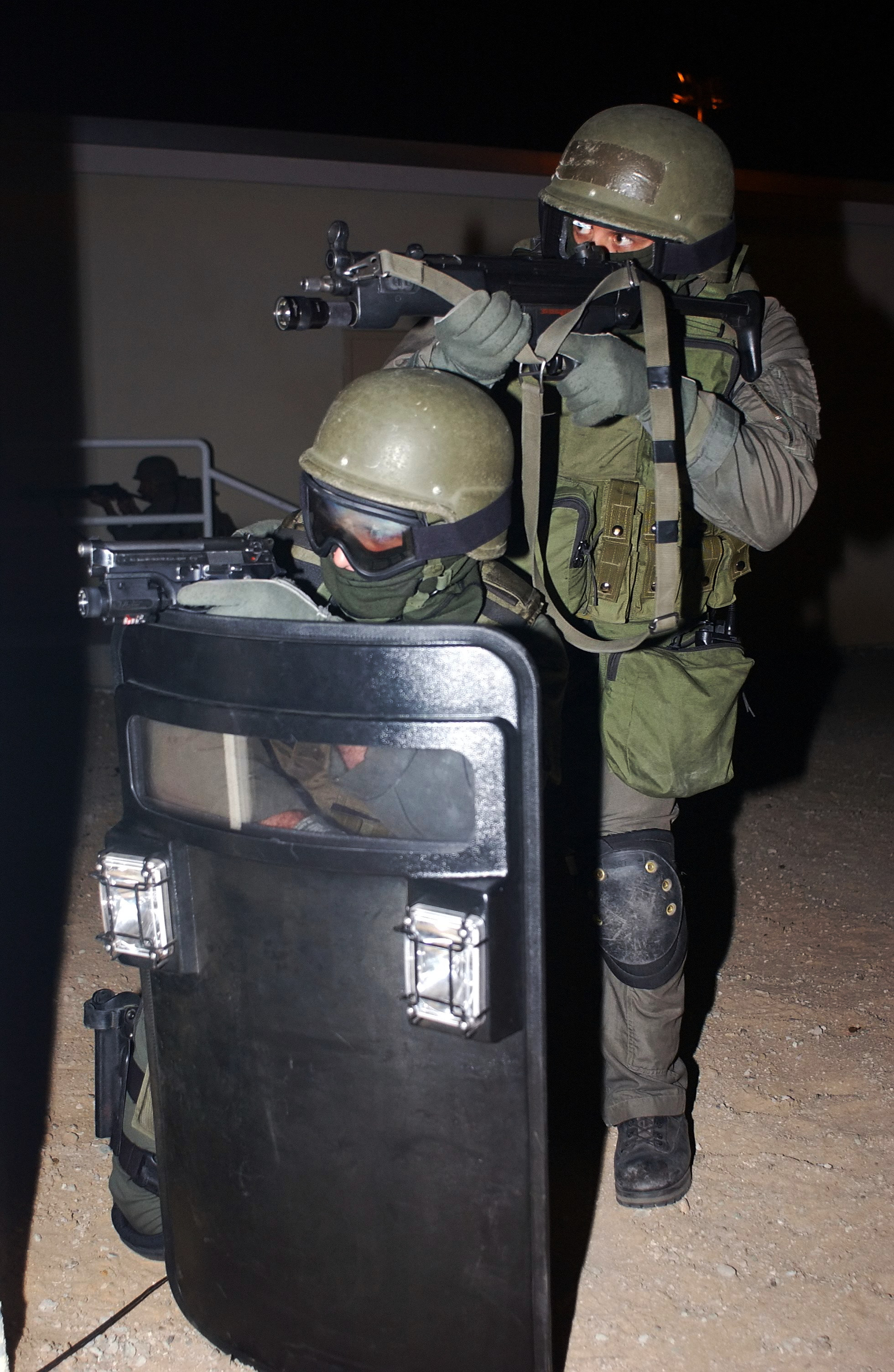
A U.S. Marine Corps Military Police Special Reaction Team using the MP5-N in February 2004.

== Testing/limited use ==
Marines with MARSOC, Force Reconnaissance, and MEU(SOC)s occasionally use specialized weapons that the rest of the fleet does not. In addition, some weapons are tested and evaluated in select units before acceptance and large-scale adoption. In a few cases, older weapons are brought out of retirement for limited use.

- M45A1 Close Quarter Battle Pistol – issued to Force Reconnaissance, MARSOC and Special Reaction Team (SRT)
- High Standard HDM (.22 LR) (USMC Force Recon, limited issue of 10 per company)
- Mk48 Mod 1
- Heckler & Koch MP5-N – MARSOC, Force Reconnaissance and SRT only
- Multi-shot Accessory Underbarrel Launcher – in evaluation
- Mk 18 CQBR – subcompact variant of the M4 carbine which replaces burst fire with fully automatic capabilities – Force Recon
- FN SCAR MK16 & 17 – MARSOC only
- Mk 12 Special Purpose Rifle – MARSOC only
- Glock 19 – MARSOC

== Retired ==
Bladed Weapons

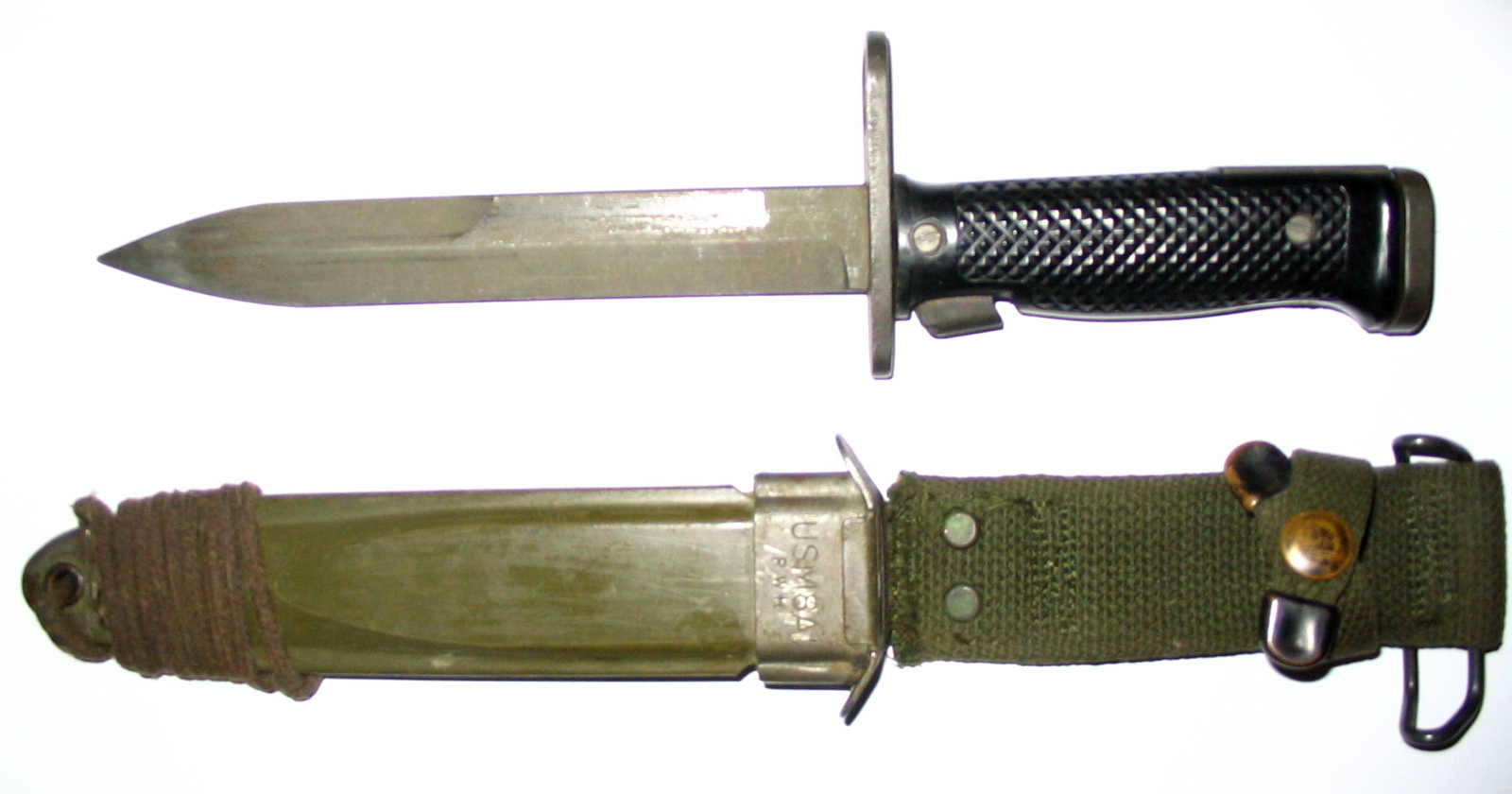
M6 bayonet with sheath

- M9 Bayonet
- M7 Bayonet
- M6 Bayonet
- M5 Bayonet
- Raider stiletto
- M1942 Bayonet
- M1917 Bayonet
- M1905 Bayonet

Pistols

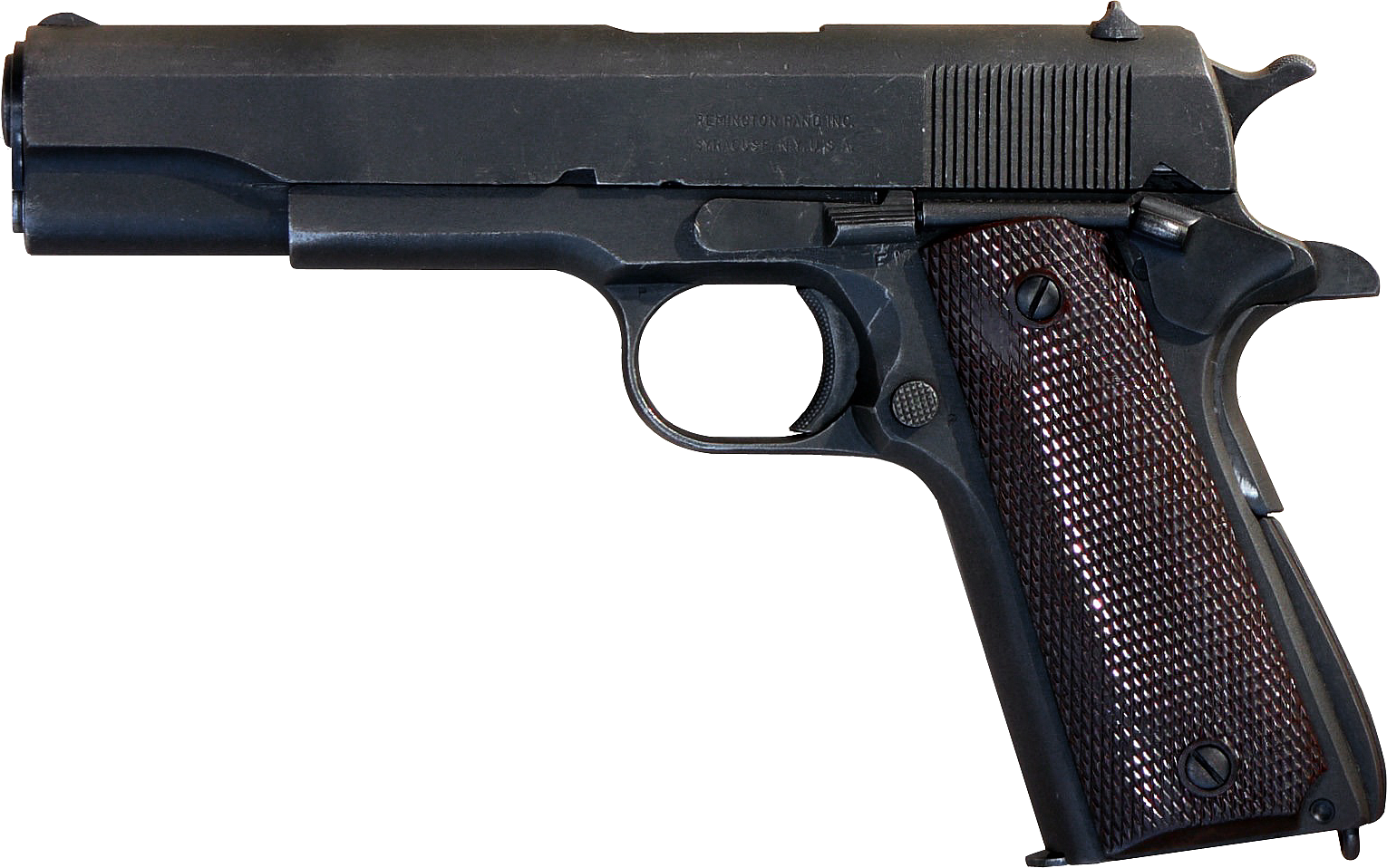
M1911A1 pistol

- M1911
- S&W Model 10
- S&W Model 66
- Ruger M108 Revolver
- M1905 Marine
- 1873 Colt Single Action
- Colt M1861 Navy
- Colt 1851 Navy Revolver
- Harper's Ferry Model 1805
- Beretta M9A1
- Beretta M9

Rifles, Carbines, & Muskets

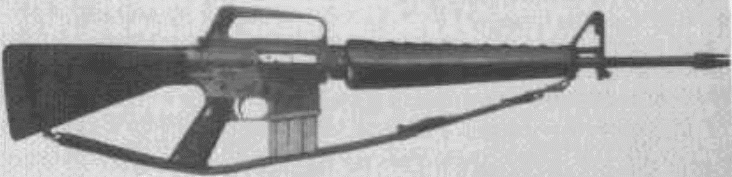
early M16 model rifle

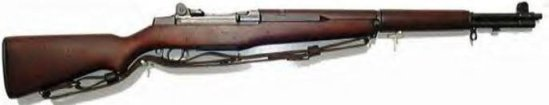
M1 Garand rifle

- United States Marine Corps Squad Advanced Marksman Rifle (SAM-R)
- Designated Marksman Rifle (DMR)
- M16A1/M16A2
- M14 Rifle
- M1 Garand
- M1917 Enfield
- M1903 Springfield
- Springfield Model 1892-99
- M1895 Lee Navy
- Springfield Model 1882 Short Rifle
- M1872 Springfield
- Spencer repeating rifle
- Springfield Model 1863
- Springfield Model 1861
- 1853 Enfield musket
- Springfield Model 1855
- M1819 Hall Rifle
- Model 1816 Musket
- Springfield Model 1812 Musket
- Model 1795 Musket
- M1/M2/M3 carbine
- M50 Reising
- Colt Model 733

Submachine guns

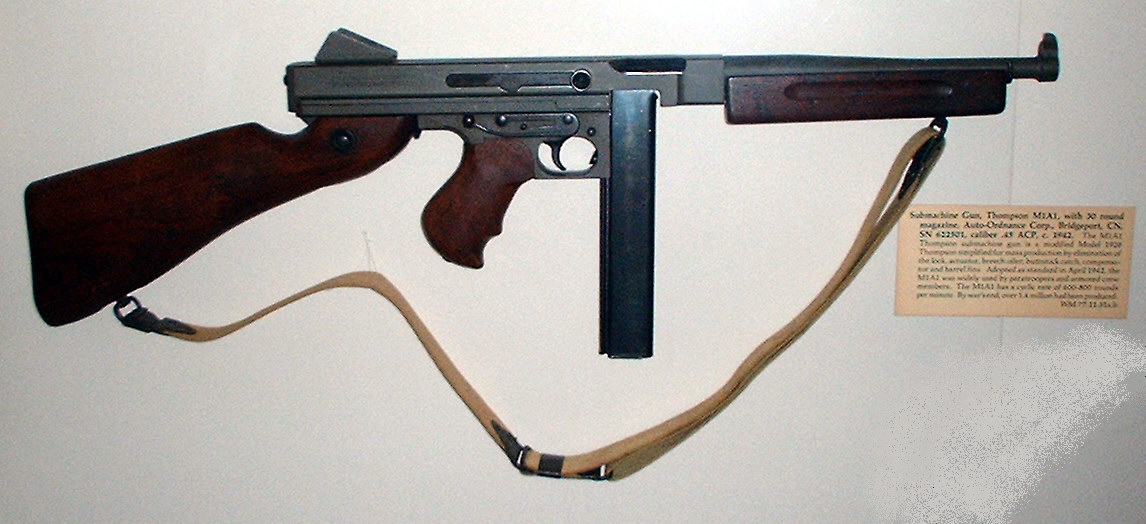
M1A1 Thompson submachine gun

- Model of 1921 Thompson
- Model of 1928 and M1928A1 Thompson
- M50 and M55 Reising
- M1 and M1A1 Thompson
- M3 and M3A1
- Heckler & Koch MP5 (some variants)

Machine guns

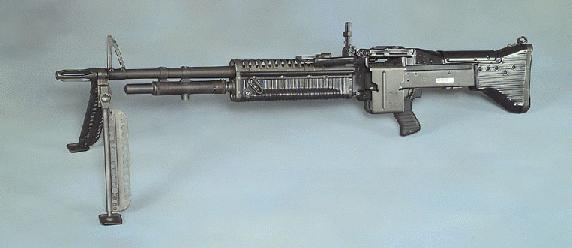
M60 7.62mm machine gun

- M1895 Colt–Browning machine gun
- Hotchkiss M1909 Benét–Mercié machine gun
- M1917 Browning machine gun
- M1918 Browning Automatic Rifle
- M1919 Browning machine gun
- M60 machine gun
- Quad 50

Explosives & Launchers

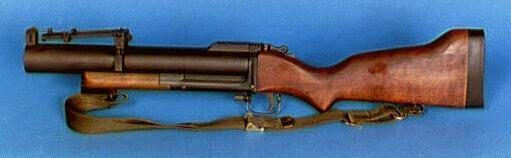
M79 grenade launcher

- M61 hand grenade
- Mk2 hand grenade
- FGM-172 Predator Short-Range Assault Weapon (SRAW)
- M79 grenade launcher
- XM148 grenade launcher
- M75 grenade launcher
- M29 mortar
- M19 mortar
- M1 mortar
- M2 mortar

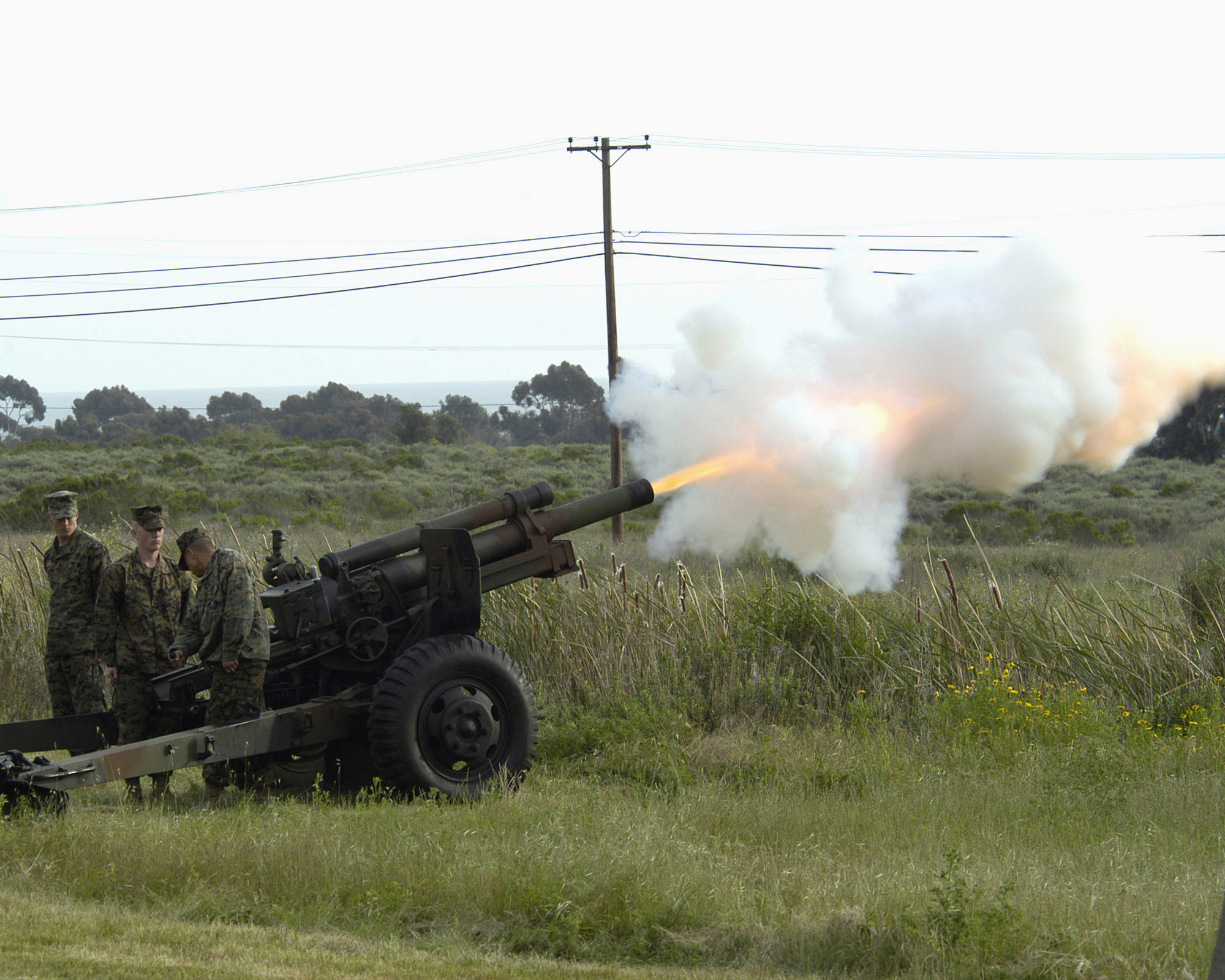
The U.S. Marine Corps still uses the M101, although for ceremonial purposes only. Here, U.S. Marines are seen firing off a M101 during a ceremony in March 2005.

- M101 Howitzer
- M102 Howitzer
- M114 155 MM Howitzer
- 155 mm gun M1 (M59 Field Gun)
- M116 Howitzer
- M67 Recoilless Rifle
- M20 Recoilless Rifle
- M202 FLASH
- M47 Dragon Anti-tank Missile System
- Bazooka Series Rocket Launcher
- FIM-43 Redeye Anti-aircraft Missile
- MIM-23 Hawk Anti-aircraft Missile
- M2 flamethrower

Aircraft/vehicle-mounted

- M2/M3 cannon
- M85 Machine Gun
- M73/M219 Machine Gun

Other

- Linear Infighting Neural Override Engagement (LINE) Combat System
- AN/PVS-4 Night Vision Sight
- AN/TVS-5 Night Vision Sight

== See also ==
- List of individual weapons of the U.S. Armed Forces
- List of crew-served weapons of the U.S. Armed Forces
- Lists of weapons
- List of firearms
- U.S. Helicopter Armament Subsystems
- Rubber duck (military)
