= Ontario Knife Company =

American knife company

- Industry: Knives, edged tools
- Founded: 1889; 137 years ago in Naples, New York, United States
- Fate: Continues operations after sale to Blue Ridge Knives, Inc.
- Successor: Blue Ridge Knives, Inc
- Headquarters: Marion, Virginia, United States
- Products: Aircrew Survival Egress Knife (ASEK) Survival Knife System; M1942 Machete; M7 bayonet; M9 bayonet; Navy MK3 MOD 0 diving/survival knife; OKC-3S Bayonet; Old Hickory; Randall's Adventure & Training survival knives; RAT-7; TAK-1
- Owner: Servotronics (?–2023); Blue Ridge Knives (2023)
- Website: Official website

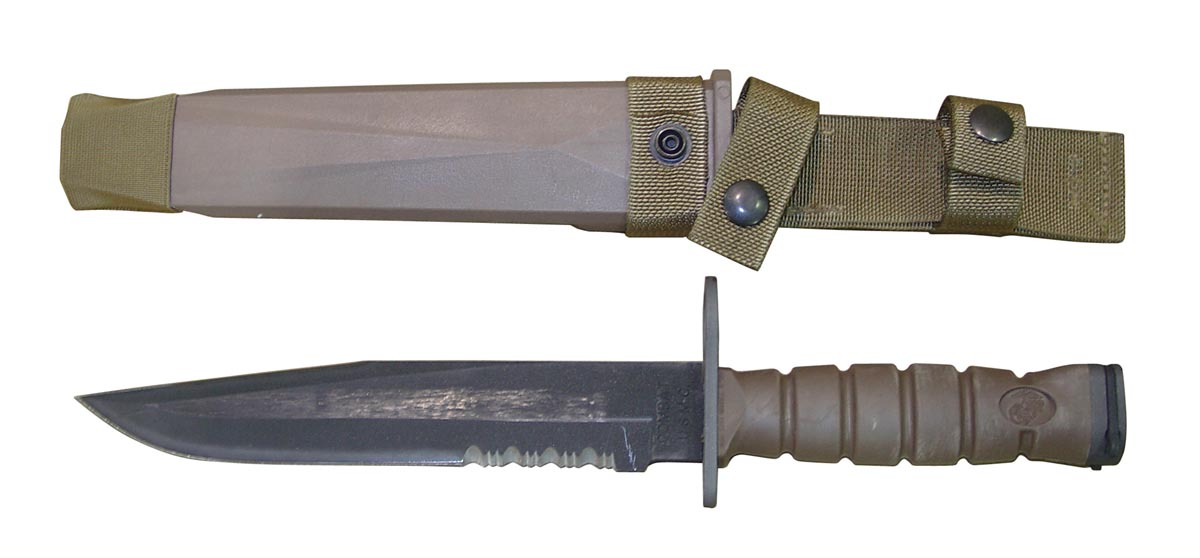
The OKC-3S Bayonet

Ontario Knife Company (OKC) is an American manufacturer of knives and military tools. On August 1, 2023, OKC was acquired by Blue Ridge Knives, Inc and relocated to Virginia.

== History ==
Ontario Knife Company was founded in 1889 in Naples, New York. It then located to Franklinville, New York, in Cattaraugus County, where most of their products have been manufactured.

== Military production ==
The company has historically supplied the U.S. military with products such as

- Aircrew Survival Egress Knife
- Model 499 U.S. Air Force Survival Knife
- Model 498 Marine Combat Knife, Ontario's version of the original Ka-Bar
- Mark 3 Knife
- Spec Plus SP6 Fighter and SP13 Tango
- Spec Plus SP25 USN-2 Navy knife
- Spec Plus SP26 USN-3 Navy pilot's survival knife
- M7 bayonet
- OKC-3S bayonet
- M9 bayonet

OKC's "Randall's Adventure & Training" survival knives were designed in conjunction with Randall's Adventure & Training, an outdoor survival training and expedition company. The lineup includes the original RTAK (formerly produced by Newt Livesay Blades), and the TAK-1 and RAT-7, both of which have been adopted by the U.S. military.

Ontario Knife Company has also collaborated with other designers such as Justin Gingrich, Bram Frank, and Bowie Knife knife-maker Bill Bagwell, introducing lower cost renditions of several of Bagwell's designs.

== Civilian production ==
Ontario sold many of its military models for civilian use, and also produced a number of sporting/outdoor knives designed explicitly for the civilian market. In addition to these, Ontario Knife Company produced a range of other cutlery and tools including Old Hickory kitchen cutlery, industrial and agricultural products, and sci-med scientific tools and instruments. Ontario Knife Company was also a major supplier of private label blades and knives.
