= Mickey Finn (inventor) =

American weapon designer (1938–2007)

Charles Albert "Mickey" Finn (June 21, 1938 – April 24, 2007) was an American weapon designer who specialized in designing military equipment for the United States Armed Forces, most famously the M9 bayonet. After retiring, he focused on designing knives and sports equipment, including the Mickey Finn T-Bar putter.

== Career ==
Finn worked as a delicatessen owner until 1975, when he transitioned to the defense industry.

Finn's company, Qual-A-Tec, also called Phrobis III, Ltd., was based in Oceanside, California, and later in Chino Valley, Arizona. Qual-A-Tec specialized in designing and producing weapons systems, their most famous design being the M9 bayonet for the M16 rifle in 1986, which was the only design out of 49 other contract bids that had a zero percent rate of failure. At the time, the company consisted of just ten employees, including Finn and his wife, Wendy. Qual-A-Tec also produced firearm muzzle devices such as suppressors, flash hiders, and muzzle brakes, including a custom suppressor for the Heckler & Koch MP5K-PDW, as well as other weapons systems, including some classified projects. In the industry he was referred to as "Q", after the special weapons supplier Q in James Bond fiction and the name of Qual-A-Tec.

In 1988, after extensive research into black operations, author Tom Clancy used Finn's name to add an extra measure of realism to The Cardinal of the Kremlin, inadvertently publicly revealing his and Qual-A-Tec's involvement in classified weapons development. Following this exposure, Finn retired from the defense industry and started a business selling military and hunting knives, while also designing sports equipment. He remained active in these ventures until his death in 2007.
