= United States Marine Corps noncommissioned officer's sword =

USMC Model 1859 NCO Sword
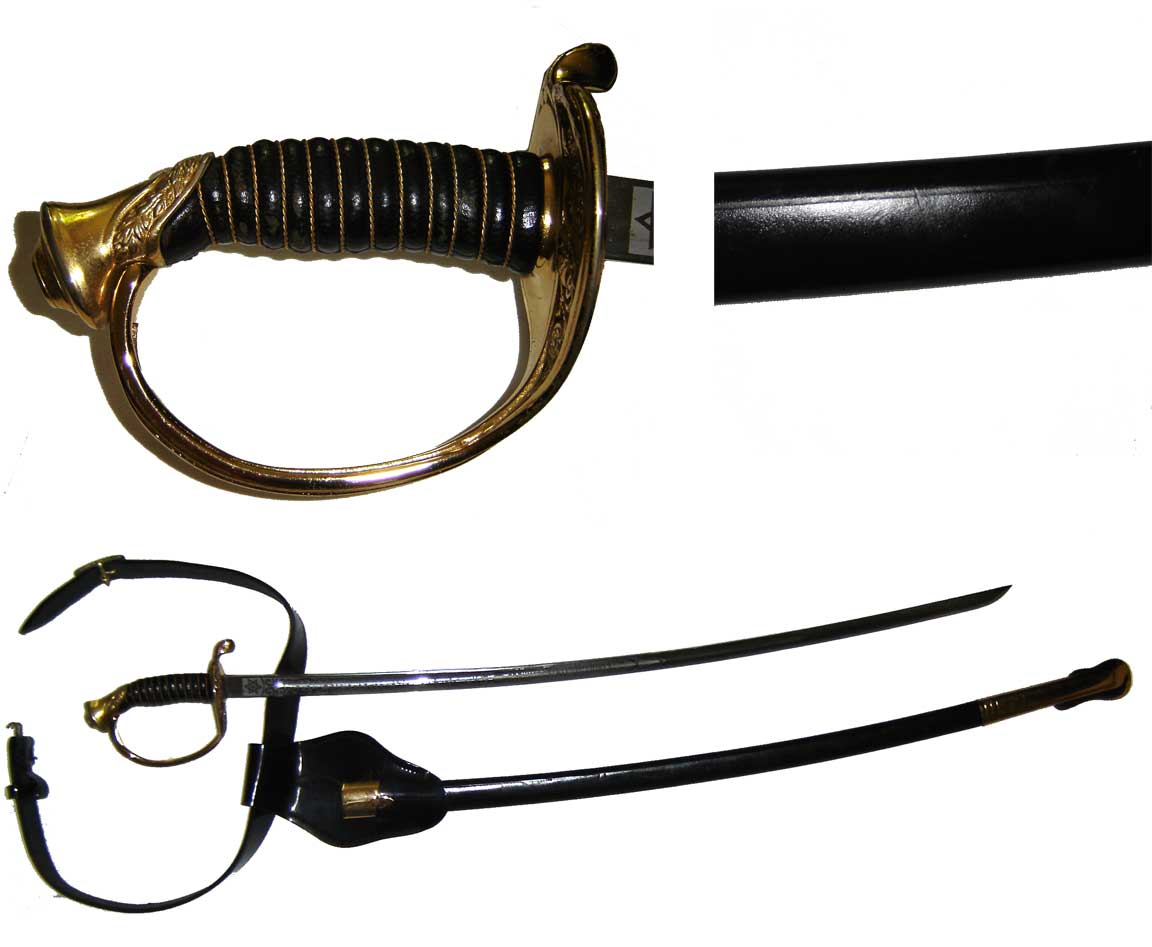
- Type: Sword
- Place of origin: United States

Service history
- In service: 1859–present
- Used by: United States Marine Corps non-commissioned officers
- Wars: Mid-19th and early-20th centuries

Production history
- Designer: Modeled on U.S. Army M1850 foot officers' sword
- Designed: Introduced 1859, notable design changes 1875, 1918
- Manufacturer: Horstmann, Ames, various others
- Produced: 1859–present
- Variants: Unetched blades until 1875, wide blades until 1918

Specifications
- Length: 34"-36" commonly
- Blade length: 28"-30" commonly
- Blade type: Saber, slightly curved, single-edged with false edge, made from various carbon steels, modern versions made from stainless steel
- Hilt type: Cast-brass hilt, leather-wrapped grip
- Scabbard/sheath: Black leather scabbard, two brass mounts, frog stud

The Marine Corps noncommissioned officer's sword is a sword worn by noncommissioned officers (NCOs) and staff noncommissioned officers (SNCOs) of the United States Marine Corps. The NCO sword was adopted in 1859 and is patterned after the United States Army's foot officers' sword of 1850.

== History ==
Sergeants’ swords are not discussed in the earliest Marine uniform regulations but were apparently items of issue by at least 1798 when in a note Commandant Burrows observed “Sergeants’ swords have brass handles”. There are occasional early mentions of purchasing swords for sergeants and musicians, but little is known about the designs prior to the adoption of the model with the distinctive stylized eagle head pommels and curved blades. About this same time, in 1826, Marine Corps officers also began wearing a distinctive new sword of the Ottoman Mameluke style, similar to those worn today.

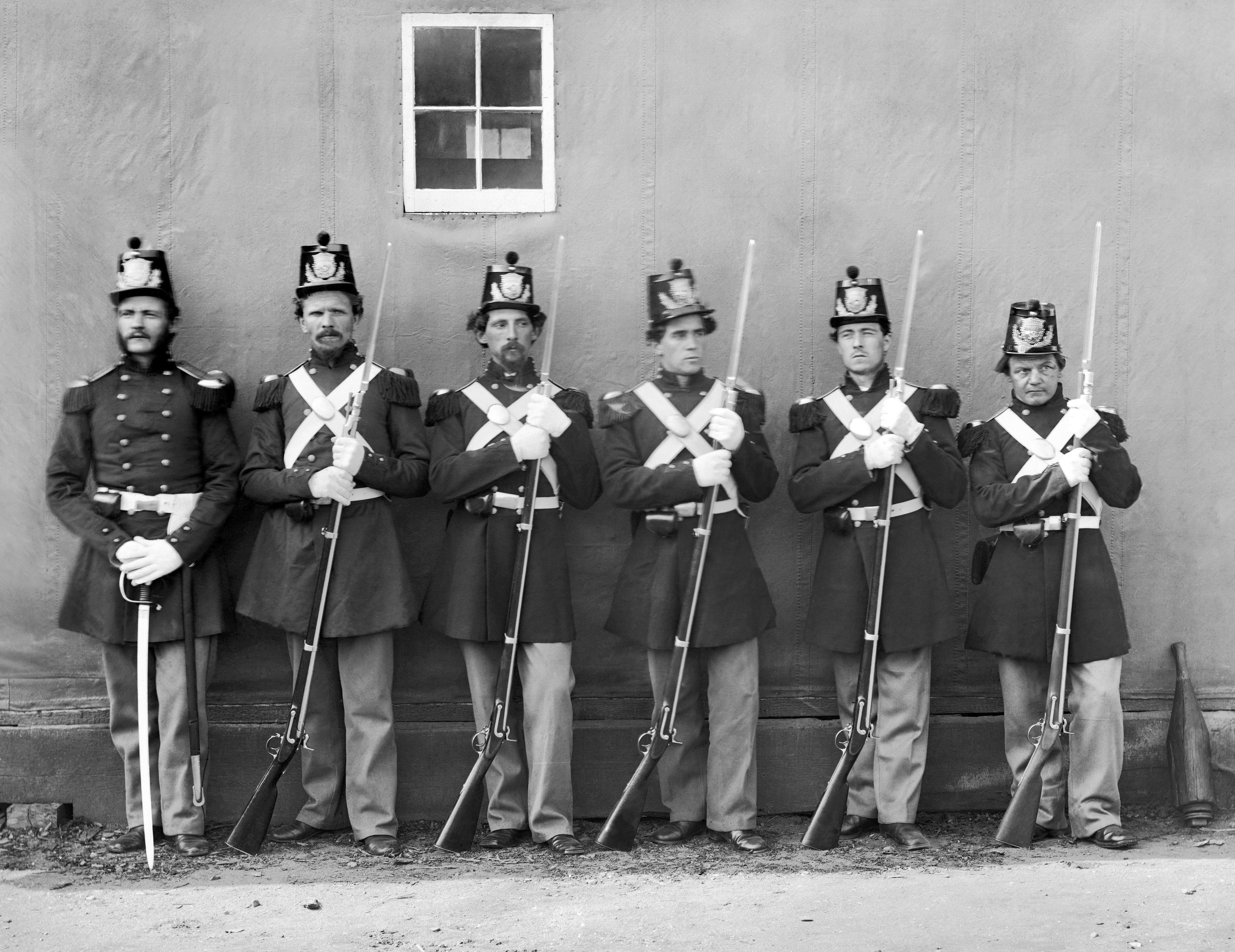
Five U.S. Marines with fixed bayonets. Their NCO displays his M1859 sword. Navy Yard, Washington, D.C., April 1864.

In 1859, a completely new sword pattern was introduced for Marine Corps officers, who were instructed to wear the same sword then worn by Army foot officers since 1850. Also, in 1859 a similar sword was authorized for wear by Marine NCOs so that the swords worn by Marine officers and NCOs appeared to share very nearly the same pattern and characteristics.

== Design ==
The sword is patterned after the United States Army's foot officers' sword of 1850, with minor differences. NCO swords initially were equipped with heavy, wide blades similar in shape and weight to those typically used on standard Army M1850 foot officers' swords.

Unlike the Army officers' blades, however, the blades on old Marine NCO swords were polished bright but not etched. The familiar etched designs on Marine NCO swords were authorized in 1875 regulations, and they have been a standard feature of Marine NCO swords ever since.

Marine NCO swords feature a cast-brass hilt with a half-basket guard; leather-wrapped grip bound with twisted brass wire; a slightly curved, single-edged blade with a wide central fuller and short false edge; and a black-leather scabbard with two brass mounts, including an upper mount with a stud for carrying in a leather belt frog, and a brass tip with drag.

The Marine NCO version, while similar to that worn by Marine officers, had several differences. Among the most noticeable, NCO swords had plain brass hilts and scabbard mounts, whereas officers' hilts and scabbard mounts normally were gilt.

Also, the grips on NCO swords were wrapped with leather, whereas those for officers were usually covered with sharkskin. Finally, NCO scabbards had only two scabbard mounts, consisting of a top mount with frog stud and a scabbard tip, whereas officers' scabbards bore three mounts, including upper and middle mounts fitted with carrying rings.

== Variations ==
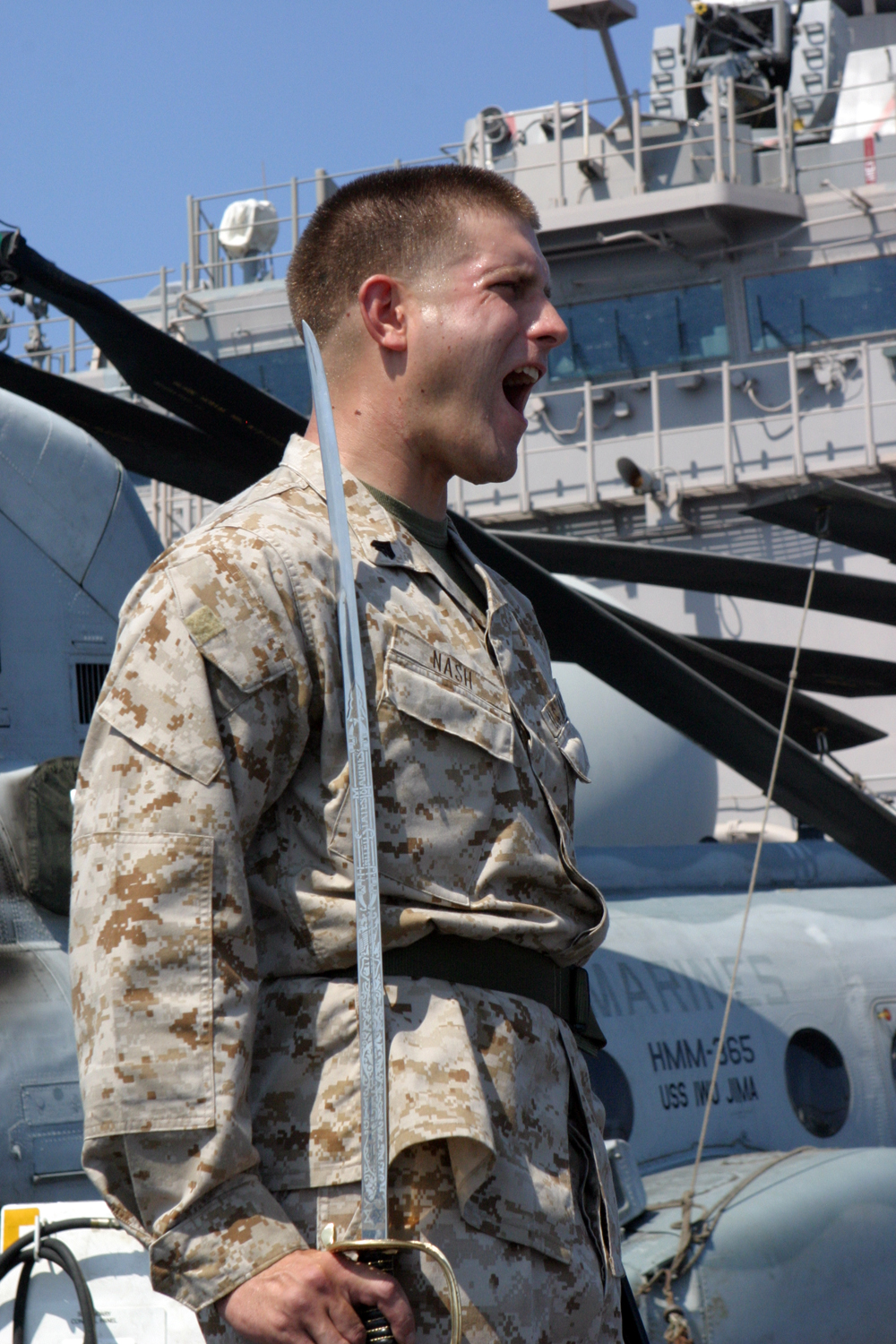
Marine using an NCO Sword with the MCCUU.

Model 1859 Marine NCO swords initially were equipped with heavy, wide blades similar in shape and weight to those typically used on standard Army M1850 foot officers' swords. Unlike the Army officers' blades, however, the blades on early Marine NCO swords were polished bright but not etched.

The familiar etched designs on Marine NCO swords were authorized later, probably in the 1860s, and they have been a standard feature of Marine NCO swords ever since.

When first adopted in 1859, it was specified that the sword was “to be worn with a frog”. By 1875, however, this had changed. The 1875 regulation now read,

The non-commissioned staff, field and band musicians shall wear a white waist belt with sword attached to the belt by a sliding frog, except the Sergeant Major and the Leader of the Band, whose swords will be slung as prescribed for officers.

Thereafter authorization to wear swords with scabbards fitted with carrying rings, for attachment to sword belt slings, was expanded to include other senior Staff NCOs, e.g. quartermaster sergeants.

These senior Staff NCO swords are frequently misidentified as Civil War USMC officer swords. This practice ceased during WWII and was not restored after the War.

== Adoption ==
The sword worn by Marine NCOs since 1859 was also carried throughout the American Civil War. With only slight modifications since that time, it has maintained its distinctive and traditional appearance.

Even though the Navy Officer Sword is older (1852), it was discontinued until reauthorized during the 1950s. The M1859 Marine NCO sword is the oldest weapon in continued (unbroken) service still in U.S. inventory.

The sword's use is restricted by regulation to ceremonial occasions by an NCO or Staff NCO in charge of troops under arms or at weddings and wedding receptions where at least one of those being married is in uniform and has the rank of Corporal or higher.

=== Sword Manual Procedures ===
The USMC Sword Manual Procedures applies to the usage of the NCO sword:

- Draw sword
- Present sword from carry or order sword
- Order sword from present sword
- Carry sword from order sword or present sword
- Eyes right (left) from carry or order sword
- Parade rest from order sword
- At ease from any position of the sword
- Rest from any position of the sword
- Return to Attention
- Return sword from carry or order sword

== See also ==
- U.S. Marine Corps swords

== Bibliography ==
- LtCol (Ret.) Cureton, Charles H., USMC. "Early Marine Corps Swords," The Bulletin of the American Society of Arms Collectors, No. 93, 2006
- Crouch, Howard R. Historic American Swords. Fairfax, VA: SCS Publications, 1999
- Peterson, Harold L. The American Sword 1775-1945. Philadelphia: Ray Riling Arms Books Co., 1970,
- USMC Essential Subjects, Dept. of Defense Legacy Resource Management Program, ISBN 0-9675123-6-0
- Guidebook For Marines, Dept. of Defense Legacy Resource Management Program, ISBN 0-940328-07-0
- Simmons & Moskin, The Marines, 1998, ISBN 0-88363-198-9,
- NAVMC 2691, Marine Corps Drill and Ceremonies Manual, January 1999
