= Khabar =

Khabar or Khabr or Khebr (Arabic: خبر; Persian: خبر) may refer to:

- Khabar, Baft, a village in Iran
- Khabar, Shahr-e Babak, a village in Iran
- Khabar Rural District (Baft County), an administrative unit in Iran
- Khabar Rural District (Shahr-e Babak County), an administrative unit in Iran
- El Khabar (The News), a daily newspaper in Algeria
- Khabar Agency, a Kazakhstani news agency

== See also ==
- Kabar (disambiguation)
- Akhbar (disambiguation)
- Khabardar (disambiguation)
