= Koshur Akhbar =

Indian online newspaper

- Type: Online newspaper
- Format: Broadsheet
- Founded: February 2005
- Language: Kashmiri
- Headquarters: Jammu and Kashmir
- Website: akhbar.neabinternational.org

Koshur Akhbar (Kashmiri: کٲشُر اخبار) is an online newspaper from the Indian state of Jammu and Kashmir that carries news and literary pieces in the Kashmiri language. There is no daily newspaper published in print media in this language, however there are weeklies currently getting published in print media.

Koshur Akhbar provides an opportunity to Kashmiris all over the world to be informed of events of Jammu & Kashmir in their own language. It helps in developing literacy of Kashmiri among its visitors.
