= M9 bayonet =

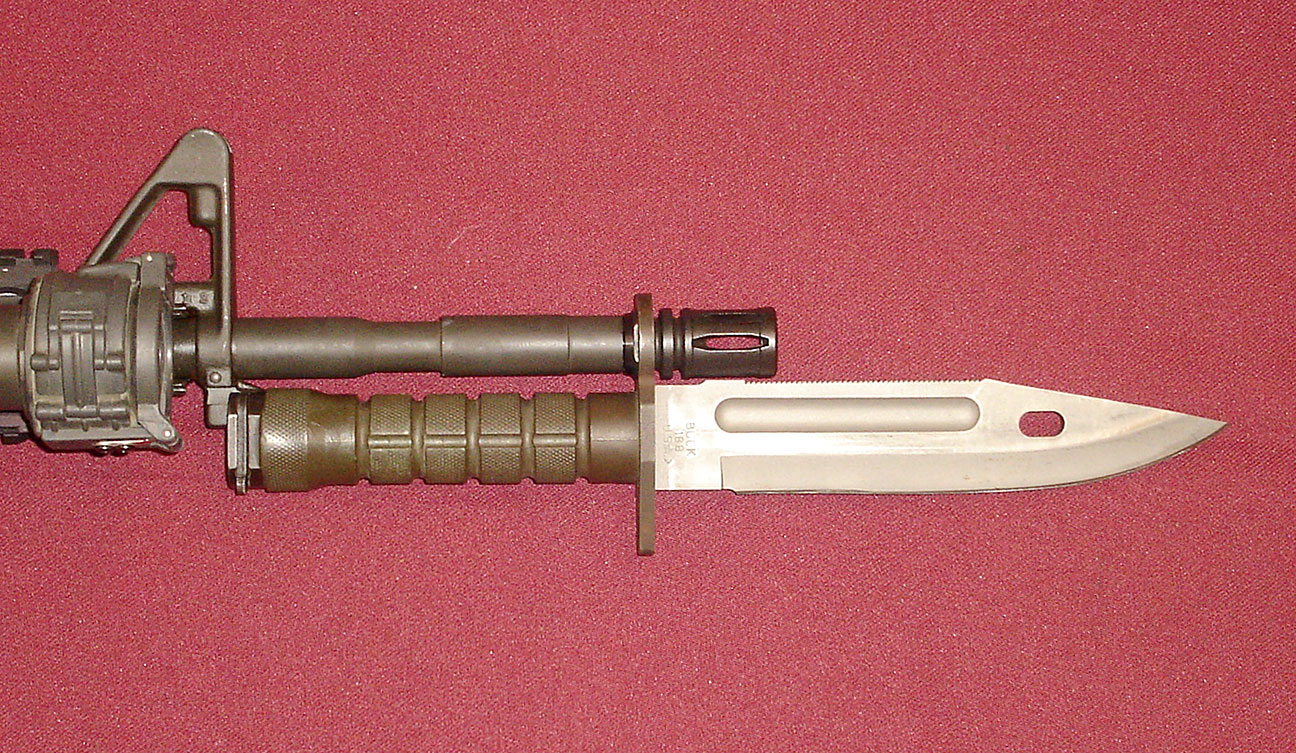
- An M9 bayonet affixed to an M4 carbine
- Type: Bayonet
- Place of origin: United States

Service history
- In service: 1986–present
- Wars: Invasion of Panama; Persian Gulf War; War in Afghanistan; Iraq War

Production history
- Designer: Charles A. "Mickey" Finn
- Designed: 1986
- Manufacturer: Phrobis, Buck Knives, LanCay, and Ontario
- Produced: 1986–present
- No. built: 405,000+

Specifications
- Length: 12 in (30 cm)
- Blade length: 7 in (18 cm)
- Blade type: Clip point

The M9 bayonet, officially known as the M9 Phrobis III, is an American multi-purpose knife and bayonet officially adopted in 1986 by the United States Armed Forces for the M16 rifle.

== History ==
In 1973, the U.S. military retired the M7 bayonet, introduced in 1964, due to changing military tactics and increasing reliance on high technology that made the use of bayonets in combat unlikely and largely unnecessary. However, this left them without a cutting tool.

The M9 bayonet was designed and developed by Charles A. "Mickey" Finn at his R&D company, Qual-A-Tec.

Finn sought to develop "a sort of Swiss Army knife for field use", out of an actual proper knife that could also be used for military combat purposes.

Qual-A-Tec's M9 bayonet design won over 49 other competitors, and was the only contract bid entry to have a zero percent failure rate. It is an improved, refined copy of the 6H3 bayonet developed by the Soviet Union for the AKM.

Finn later produced the M9 under the Phrobis III name, filling a military contract for 325,000 units. Buck Knives was contracted to produce 300,000 units, and sold a commercial version under their own name until 1997.

Finn's designs proved extremely popular, and were widely counterfeited and sold illegally by other makers. In 1989, Finn received U.S. patent 4,821,356, but unlicensed copies from Asia and Mexico cut into his legitimate sales.

After the Phrobis III bayonet contract was completed in 1989, rights to the M9 reverted to the United States Army and there were many subsequent versions from other companies. The Marine Corps issues the OKC-3S bayonet instead of the M9.

== Design ==
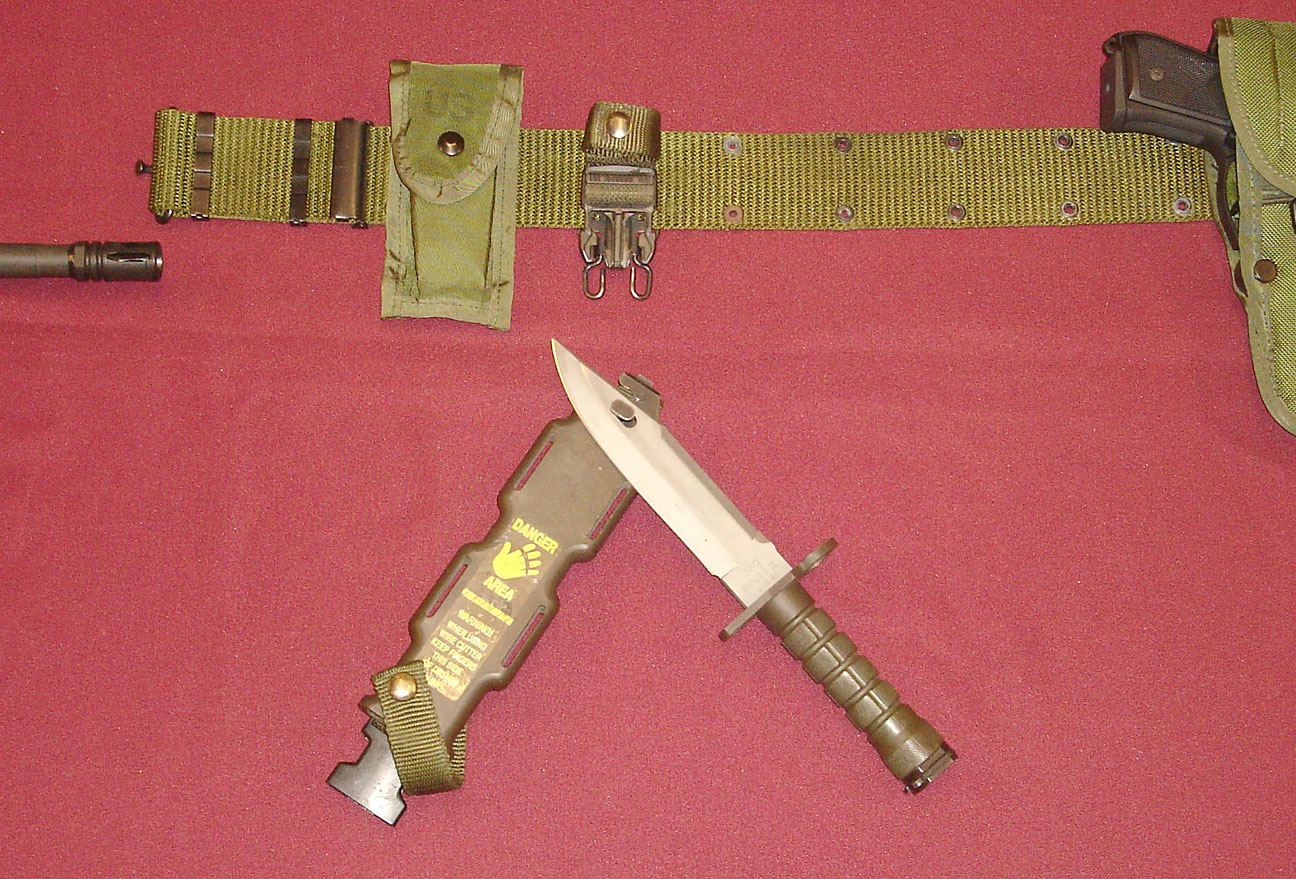
An M9 bayonet with its sheath

Featuring a 7-inch (18 cm) blade and issued with a sheath designed to double as a wire cutter, the M9 bayonet is designed to function not only as a combat knife but also as a multi-tool, capable of serving as a wire cutter, metal slicer, bottle opener, and screwdriver.

The M9 multipurpose bayonet system is used as a bayonet on the M16 series rifle, on the M4 series carbine, as a fighting knife, as a general field and utility knife, as a wire cutter when used on the sheath, and as a saw.

The M7 and M9 bayonet can also be mounted onto the Mossberg 590A1 shotgun.

Some production runs of the M9 have a fuller and some do not, depending upon which contractor manufactured that batch and what the military specs were at the time.

== Makes ==
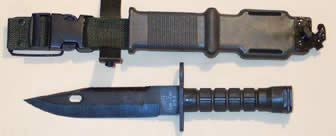
M9 bayonet and M10 scabbard "product improved" sheath

There have been five main makes of M9s: Phrobis III, Buck Knives, LanCay, Ontario, and Tri-Technologies.

Starting in 1987, Phrobis subcontracted Buck for production in its initial U.S. Army contract, finishing in 1989. It was around this time that Buck sold commercial M9s as well, lasting until 1997.

LanCay received its first contract in March 1992, taking over production from Buck, for 30,000 knives, later increased to 50,000, with General Cutlery as a subcontractor.

In 1994, there was another contract issued for about 100,000 improved M9 models. In 1999, a contract for 25,000 knives was split between LanCay and Ontario, with each company producing 12,500 knives each.

Ontario also participated in later contracts, and continued to produce them well past 2005.

In 2012, Tri-Technologies was awarded a contract for 40,000 M9s.

=== Production numbers ===
These are production numbers for M9 bayonets produced by Buck Knives.

The 5,000 bayonets produced for the United States Marine Corps are included under the U.S. Army numbers in this listing.

Type	Buck Part#	Quantity
U.S. Army	0188-00-0	330,254
Australian	0188-A1-0	20,050
Abu Dhabi	0188-AD-0	1,500
Commercial (black)	0188-BK-0	14,213
Diemaco	0188-DM-0	8,681
Marine Prototype	0188-MC-0	350
Commercial (green)	0188-CB-0	28,238
Field Knife (Japan I)	0188-J1-0	1,956
Field Knife (Japan II)	0188-J2-0	504
Total:		405,746

== Comparison ==
The M7 bayonet, introduced in 1964, was used as a bayonet on the M16 rifle, M4 carbine, and as a fighting knife.

Although it has been claimed that the M9 may be more prone to breakage than the older M7 bayonet, the M9 has a 20% thicker blade, the tang is reduced from (0.235 to 0.195 in (0.60 to 0.50 cm)) in thickness, and a 75% greater cross-sectional area of steel in the blade than the M7.

Designation	M7	M9
Entered Army Service:	1964	1986
Blade length:	6.75 in (17.1 cm)	7 in (18 cm)
Total length:	11.75 in (29.8 cm)	12 in (30 cm)

== Variants ==
=== M11 knife ===
Also known as the M11 EOD, the M11 is a version of the M9 specialized for explosive ordnance disposal (EOD).

The M11 has some extra features, such as a hammer pommel, but uses the same blade and sheath as the M9.

The M11 is not strictly a bayonet, as it has no mounting catch or muzzle ring; rather, it is more of a revision to the Buckmaster 184/188 knife, which was the basis for the Phrobis XM-9 prototype bayonet.

=== Xianfeng D91 ===
Chinese copy made by Norinco via Xianfeng Industries (Chinese: 先锋工业), originally made for the Type 81, but never commenced mass production.

=== Xianfeng D80 ===
Chinese copy made by Norinco via Xianfeng Industries (Chinese: 先锋工业), could be mounted on Norinco CQ and M16 rifles.

=== Smith & Wesson SW3B ===
M9 variant made by Smith & Wesson featuring a serrated blade and a textured nylon hilt.

== Users ==
The M9 is issued by the U.S. military and other countries.

- Abu Dhabi
- Australia
- Chile
- Hong Kong
  - Special Duties Unit
- India
- Japan
- The Netherlands
- New Zealand
- Thailand
- United States

== See also ==
- M1 bayonet
- M3 trench knife
- M4 bayonet
- M5 bayonet
- M6 bayonet
- M7 bayonet
- Mk 3 knife
- Strider SMF
- Glock knife
- Aircrew Survival Egress Knife
- OKC-3S Bayonet
- KA-BAR
- QNL-95
- 6KH2 bayonet
- 6KH3 bayonet
- 6KH4 bayonet
- 6KH5 bayonet
- 6KH9 bayonet
