= Khabardar (TV series) =

Popular news show on NDTV India

Khabardar is a popular news show on NDTV India hosted by Vinod Dua, until his death in December 2021. It launched on July 19, 2003, and aired Monday to Thursday, focusing on politics and corruption.
