= Akhbarul Hind =

Akhbarul Hind (in Arabic اخبار الهند meaning The News of India) is an Arabic language fortnightly publication from Mumbai, India.
