= OKC-3S bayonet =

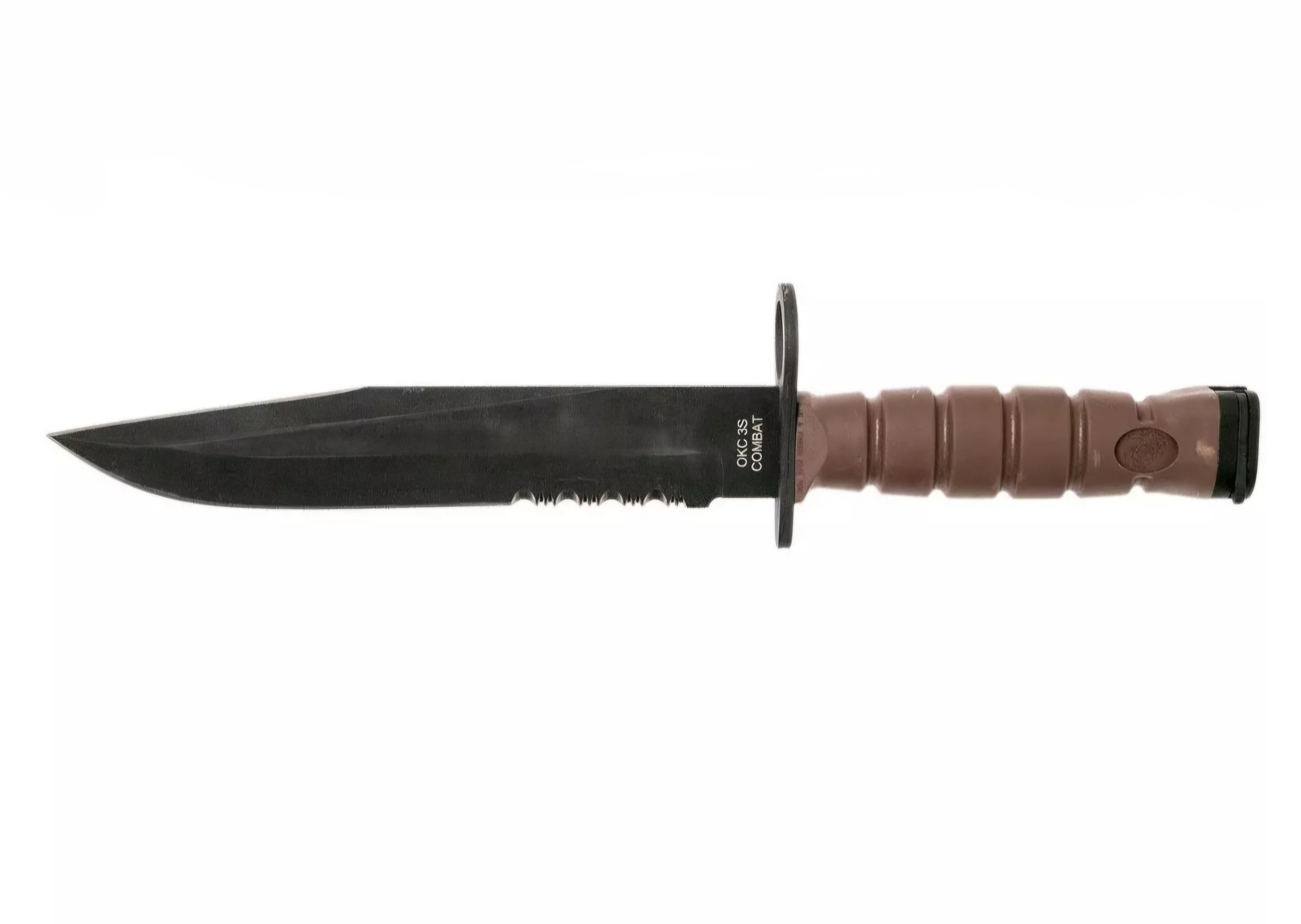
- OKC-3S bayonet
- Type: Bayonet
- Place of origin: United States

Service history
- In service: 2003–present
- Used by: United States Marine Corps
- Wars: War in Afghanistan; Iraq War

Production history
- Designed: 2001–2002
- Manufacturer: Ontario Knife Company
- Produced: 2003–present
- No. built: 100,000+

Specifications
- Length: 13.25 in (33.7 cm)
- Blade length: 8 in (20 cm)
- Blade type: High carbon steel clip point with full tang
- Hilt type: Metal guard, latch, & clasp, with Dynaflex grip
- Scabbard/sheath: polyester elastomer

The OKC-3S is a bayonet developed and manufactured by the Ontario Knife Company.

== History ==
The OKC-3S is part of a series of weapon improvements begun in 2001 by Commandant of the Marine Corps James L. Jones to expand and toughen hand-to-hand combat training for Marines, including training in the Marine Corps Martial Arts Program and knife fighting.

In the Multi-Purpose Bayonet program, 33 different knives were evaluated. The OKC-3S performed best, or next to best, in nearly all testing categories. A contract for OKC-3S was made in December 2002, with production and distribution beginning in January 2003.

The OKC-3S was designed to replace the M7 bayonet and M9 bayonet as its service bayonet for the M16 family of rifles and M4 series carbine in the United States Marine Corps, providing greater durability than the M7 bayonet and also functions as a fighting knife.

== Design ==
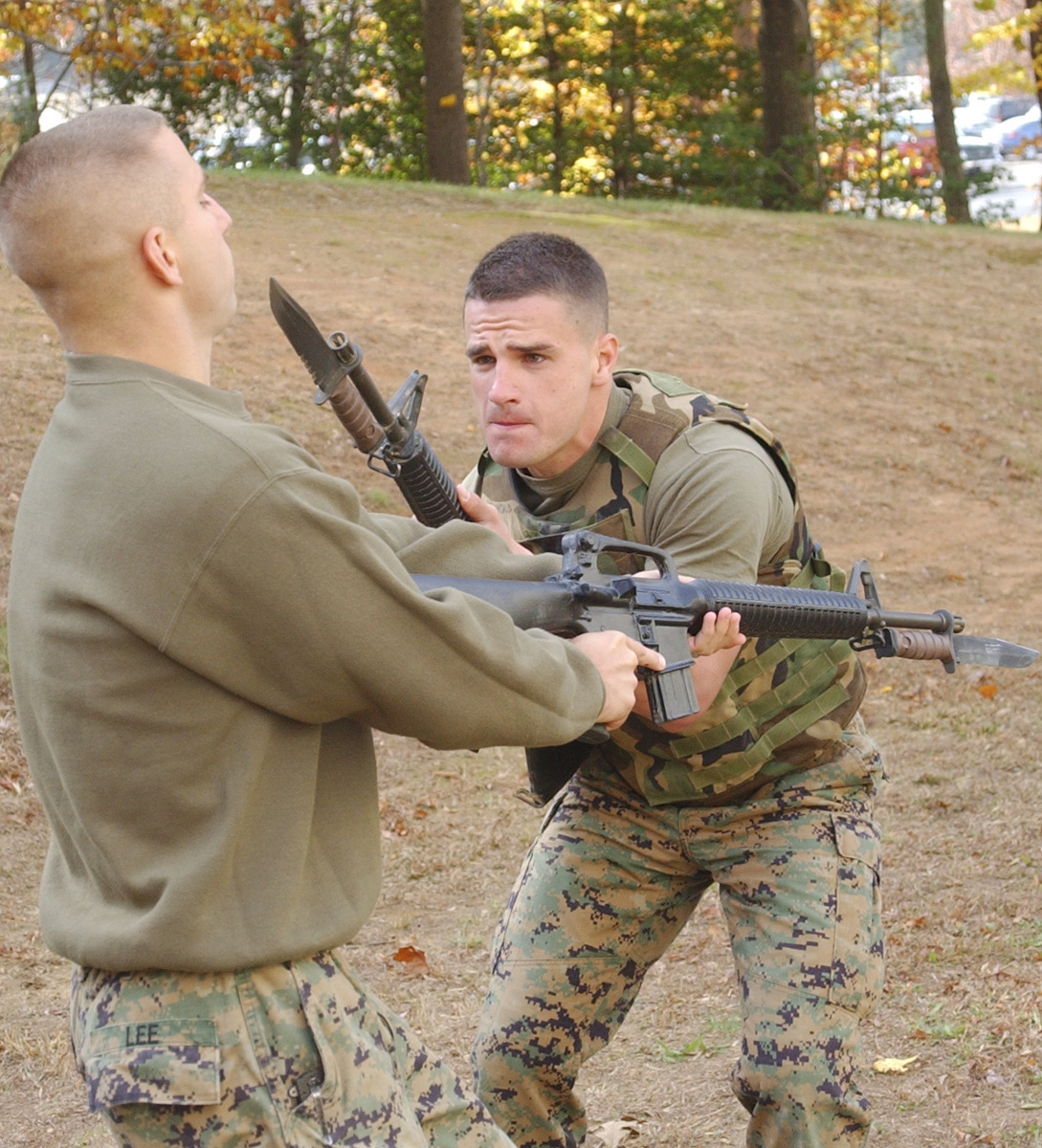
Marines at bayonet practice

The OKC-3S bears a resemblance to the Marines' Ka-Bar fighting knife, though it is not fullered. The OKC-3S is also larger, thicker, and heavier than the M7 bayonet, although it is slightly thinner and lighter than the current U.S. Army issued M9 bayonet.

A sharper point helps penetrate body armor that many modern adversaries wear; while serrations near the handle help improve its function as a utility knife. In one demonstration, a prototype was able to pierce a punching bag covered with aircraft aluminum and a ballistic vest.

The OKC-3S is designed to be corrosion resistant, and weighs 1.25 lb (0.57 kg) with its sheath. The scabbard and grip are colored to match the Corps' coyote tan gear, compatible with both woodland and desert camouflage. The National Stock Number (NSN) is 1095-01-521-6087.

The OKC-3S features an 8 in (20.32 cm) long, 1.375 in (3.49 cm) wide, 0.2 in (0.51 cm) thick blade. The serrations measure 1.75 in (4.4 cm) of the blade length on the true edge. The blade is made from high carbon steel rated at HRC 53-58 and is capable of functioning without breakage in operating temperatures of −25 to 135 °F (−32 to 57 °C). The blade also has a non-reflective phosphate finish.

The OKC-3S' grip is made of Dynaflex, a synthetic non-slip material, is ergonomically grooved, and is more oval than round. This design helps prevent repetitive-strain injuries and hand fatigue during training. It also features an embossed Eagle, Globe, and Anchor molded in to allow a user to identify the direction of the blade in the dark.

The OKC-3S' encapsulated tang connects the cross guard/muzzle ring (which is .165 in (0.42 cm)) and pommel latch plate that clasps the barrel lug; both are phosphate coated like the blade.

Former Ontario Knife Company president and chief executive Nick Trbovich Jr. said of it:

We spent a lot of time making sure the handle was ergonomically correct… There are no blister points on the handle.

The OKC-3S' polyester elastomer scabbard, designed by Natick Labs, offers a weight and noise reduction from the previous M7 scabbard and is ILBE compatible. It has a fitted internal stainless steel spring and friction device at its throat to secure the bayonet.

A ceramic-coated aluminum honing rod is located on the back of the OKC-3S' scabbard. The scabbard is compatible with the MOLLE or PALS modular attachment system. The scabbard lacks the wire cutter of the M9 for use when assaulting beaches or other concertina wire–fortified obstacles.

== See also ==
- List of individual weapons of the U.S. armed forces
- List of weapons of the United States Marine Corps
