= Ka-Bar =

Military combat knife

(USMC) Knife, Fighting Utility (USN Mark 2 utility knife)
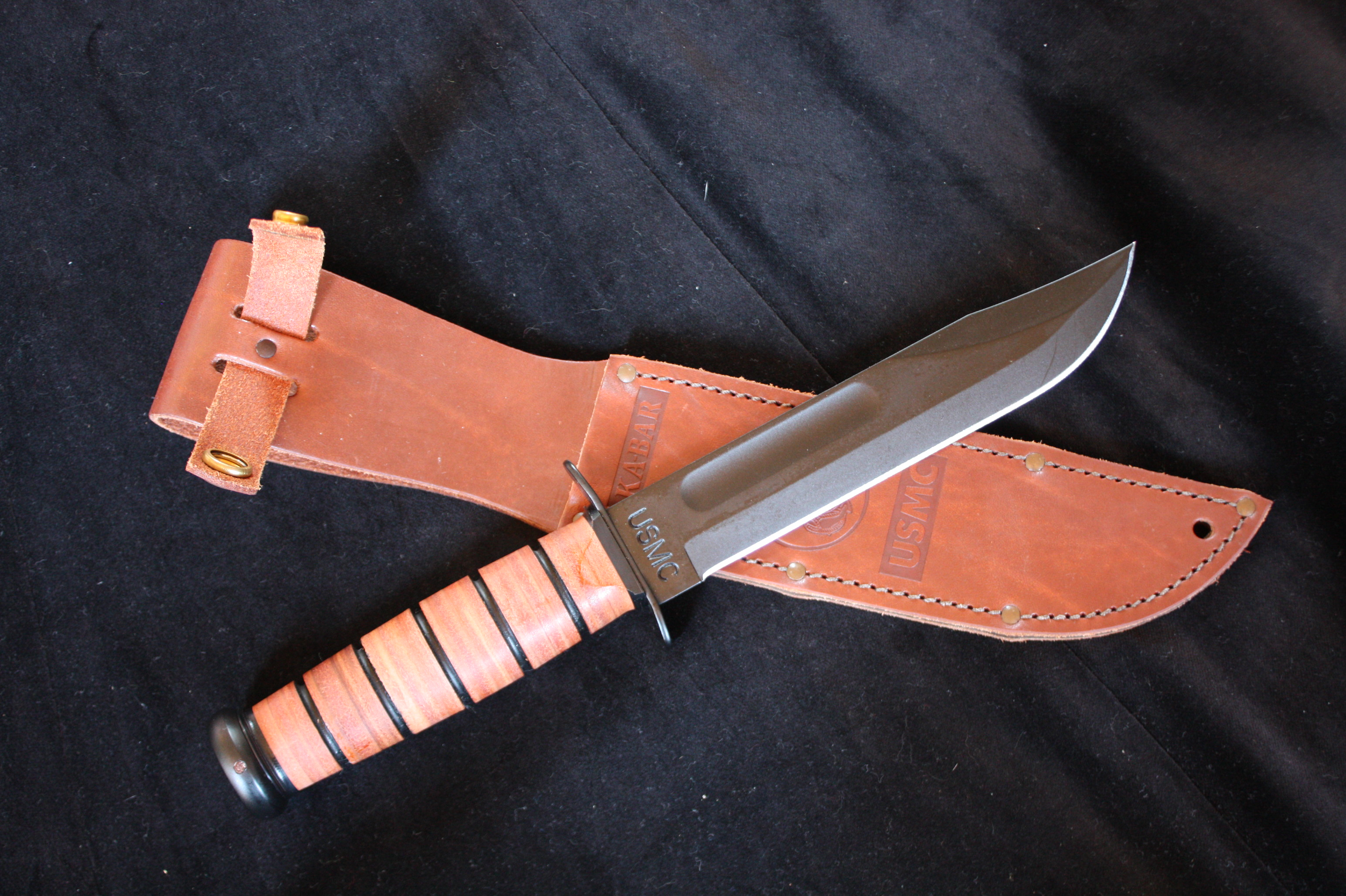
- USMC Ka-Bar knife with leather sheath
- Type: Knife
- Place of origin: United States

Service history
- Wars: World War II; Indochina War; Korean War; Algerian War; Vietnam War; Gulf War; War in Afghanistan; Iraq War

Production history
- Designed: 23 November 1942
- Manufacturer: Camillus Cutlery Co.; Union Cutlery Co.; Pal Cutlery Co.; Robeson (ShurEdge) Cutlery Co.; Ontario Knife Co.
- Produced: 1943–present

Specifications
- Mass: 0.7 lb (320 g)
- Length: 11 7/8 in (30.16 cm)
- Blade length: 7 in (18 cm)
- Blade type: Clip point
- Hilt type: Stacked leather washers
- Scabbard/sheath: Leather (USMC) or plastic (USN)

Ka-Bar (/ˈkeɪ.bɑːr/; trademarked as KA-BAR) is the combat knife adopted in 1942 by the United States Marine Corps as the U.S. Marine Corps utility knife, Mark 2.

== History ==
After the United States' entry into World War II, complaints arose from Army soldiers and Marines who were issued World War I–era bronze or alloy-handled trench knives such as the U.S. Mark I trench knife for use in hand-to-hand fighting.

A final impetus came from the War Department, which had identified the need for a multi-purpose knife suitable both as a fighting knife and as a utility knife, while still conserving metal resources.

While the Marine Corps authorised the use of Marine Raider stiletto, in the absence of suitable official-issue knives, a number of marines obtained personal knives and machetes by either private purchase or unit funds.

Among the weapons discovered are usually hunting/utility patterns such as Western States Cutlery Co.'s pre-war L76 and L77 pattern knives, both of which had 7-inch (180 mm) Bowie-type clip blades and leather handles.

In response to a specification requesting a modern individual fighting knife design for the U.S. Marines, ordnance and quartermaster officials requested submissions from several military knife and tool suppliers to develop a suitable fighting and utility knife for individual Marines.

The prototype design was given the designation of 1219C2. After extensive trials, it was recommended for adoption. The Marines' quartermaster at the time initially refused to order the knives, but his decision was overruled by the commandant. The Marine Corps adopted the knife on 23 November 1942.

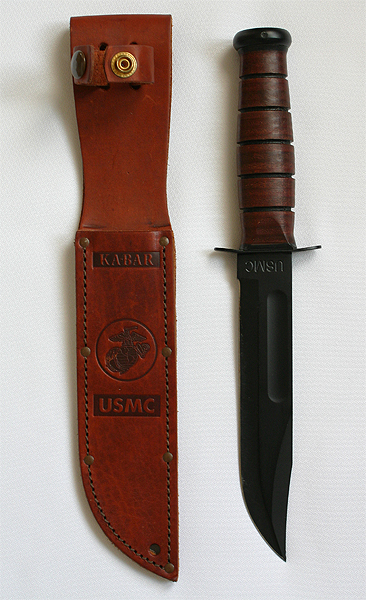
A traditional Ka-Bar knife and leather sheath of unknown age

The knife proved easy to manufacture, and the first run was shipped 27 January 1943, by Camillus Cutlery Company.

== Manufacturers ==
Camillus Cutlery Co., the first and largest manufacturer to supply the knife, produced over one million with "Camillus.N.Y." on the knife's ricasso with the branch of service (USN or USMC) which on later knives were moved to the crossguard.

Besides Camillus, the Union Cutlery Co. (Kabar), Robeson (ShurEdge) Cutlery Co., and PAL Cutlery Co. produced the MK2 knife under military contract during World War II.

After the end of World War II, Utica Cutlery Co., Conetta Cutlery Co., Camillus, and, around 1980, Ontario Knife Co., all produced the knife under contract for the U.S. military.

From 1945 to 1952, Weske Cutlery Co. of Sandusky, Ohio, purchased leftover and overrun parts from wartime knife contractors and assembled them for commercial sale, polishing out manufacturer and military markings, and fitting them with ungrooved leather handles.

Though W. R. Case made two prototype Ka-Bar knives as part of a contract submission in 1942–43, no contract was ever awarded to Case for the production of the knife.

In 1992, Case released a modern commemorative version of these prototypes, the Case XX USMC Fighting Utility Knife. The Case knife is manufactured for Case by Ontario Knife Co.

== Branding ==
Ka-Bar is the name of a related knife manufacturing company, Ka-Bar Knives, Inc. (formerly Union Cutlery Co.), of Olean, New York, a subsidiary of the Cutco Corporation.

Although Ka-Bar Knives, Inc., currently makes a wide variety of knives and cutlery, it is best known for the Ka-Bar Fighting/Utility knife, which has traditionally used a 7-inch (17.8 cm) 1095 carbon steel clip point blade and leather-washer handle.

=== Trademark issue ===
The originator of the KA-BAR trademark, Union Cutlery Co, began using the name in 1923, having received a letter from a fur trapper who had used the knife to kill a wounded bear which attacked him when his rifle jammed.

According to company records, the letter was only partially legible; "ka bar" could be read, as fragments of the phrase "kill a bear". In 1923, the company adopted the name Ka-Bar from the "bear story" as its trademark.

From 1923, the KA-BAR trademark was used as a ricasso stamp by Union Cutlery Co. on its line of automatic switchblade pocket knives, including the KA-BAR Grizzly, KA-BAR Baby Grizzly, and KA-BAR Model 6110 Lever Release knives.

The company produced about 1 million knives with the trademark on the ricasso.

By 1944, Marines began referring to the knife as the "KA-BAR", regardless of manufacturer.

The popular designation of the knife may also have resulted from contact with Marine Corps close combat instructors in San Diego, who used the name when training recruits. To capitalize on the popularity, Union Cutlery changed its name to Ka-Bar Cutlery Inc. in 1952.

== Design ==
The KA-BAR is based on the Mark I trench knife and existing civilian hunting/utility knives such as Western's L77 as a basis for further improvements with USMC Colonel John M. Davis and Major Howard E. America contributed several important changes.

The KA-BAR has a longer, stronger blade, introduced a small fuller to lighten the blade, a peened pommel (later replaced by a pinned pommel), a straight (later, slightly curved) steel crossguard, and a stacked leather handle for better grip.

The National Stock Number (NSN) is 1095-01-581-9100.

=== Construction ===
The blade, guard, and pommel were Parkerized instead of the bright polished steel of the prototype.

The knife used a thicker blade stock than that of the USN Mark 1 utility knife, and featured a clip point.

According to Ka-Bar, its 1095 Cro-Van, a moderate carbon and low chromium steel alloy, allows the blade to hold an edge very well. The "1095 Cro-Van" steel used in the blades of contemporary Ka-Bars has a hardness of 56–58 HRC, while the guard and pommel are made from sintered 1095 carbon steel.

Besides use as a fighting knife, the Ka-Bar has proved useful as a utility knife, for opening cans, digging trenches, and cutting wood, roots, wire, and cable.

== Variants ==
=== D2 Extreme ===
In 1999, Ka-Bar released the "D2 Extreme" version of their fighting knife.

It comes with the same synthetic handle and sheath that was produced with the "Next Generation", but also a blade made from D2 tool steel for extra edge retention and slightly better corrosion resistance than 1095.

=== The Next Generation ===
In 1995, a version was released with a stainless steel blade, synthetic handle, and synthetic sheath marketed as "The Next Generation". As of June 2012 the "Next Generation" models have been discontinued.

== Service ==
=== Designation ===
As its new name implied, the "Knife, Fighting Utility" was designed from the outset as a dual-purpose knife: it was both an effective combat knife and a utility tool, well-suited to the type of jungle warfare encountered by Marines in the Pacific theater.

This dual-purpose design resulted in some initial criticism of the pattern as being less than ideal for knife fighting, but combat experience of returning veterans as well as reports from the battlefield dispelled doubts about its combat effectiveness.

=== Adoption ===
After the U.S. Navy became disenchanted with blade failures on the USN Mark 1 utility knife, the latter service adopted the Ka-Bar as the US Navy Utility Knife, Mark 2.

The Marine Corps in turn re-designated the Ka-Bar as either the USMC Mark 2 Combat Knife, or simply the Knife, Fighting Utility. In naval service, the knife was used as a diving and utility knife from late 1943 onward, though the stacked leather handle tended to rot and disintegrate rapidly in salt water.

The Marine Corps issued Ka-Bar fighting utility knife throughout Marine forces, with early deliveries going primarily to elite formations. In late 1943 the Ka-Bar replaced the Marine Raider stiletto in service, a change welcomed by the Marines of Col. Edson's 1st Raider Battalion, who found the Raider stiletto ideal for silent killing but of little use for anything else.

As the knife went into large-scale production, the Marines issued the Ka-Bar Fighting Utility knife to reconnaissance and engineering units and to any Marine armed with the M1911 pistol, M1 carbine, BAR, or crew-served machine gun (rifle-armed Marines were typically issued a bayonet). Marines were often issued knives with "U.S.N. Mark 2" markings when Navy-issued Ka-Bar knives were all that was available.

By 1944 the Ka-Bar knife was issued to virtually any Marine in the combat branches who desired one, and was in use by Marine Corps close combat instructors for training new recruits. Unlike the prior Marine Raider stiletto, Marines were taught to use their new knife primarily as a slashing weapon in the initial phases of hand-to-hand combat.

After the Second World War, the U.S. Navy and Marine Corps continued to use the Ka-Bar Fighting Utility knife. In addition to military contract knives, the knife was produced for the civilian market, and the pattern enjoyed some popularity as a general-purpose hunting and utility knife.

=== Issued versions ===
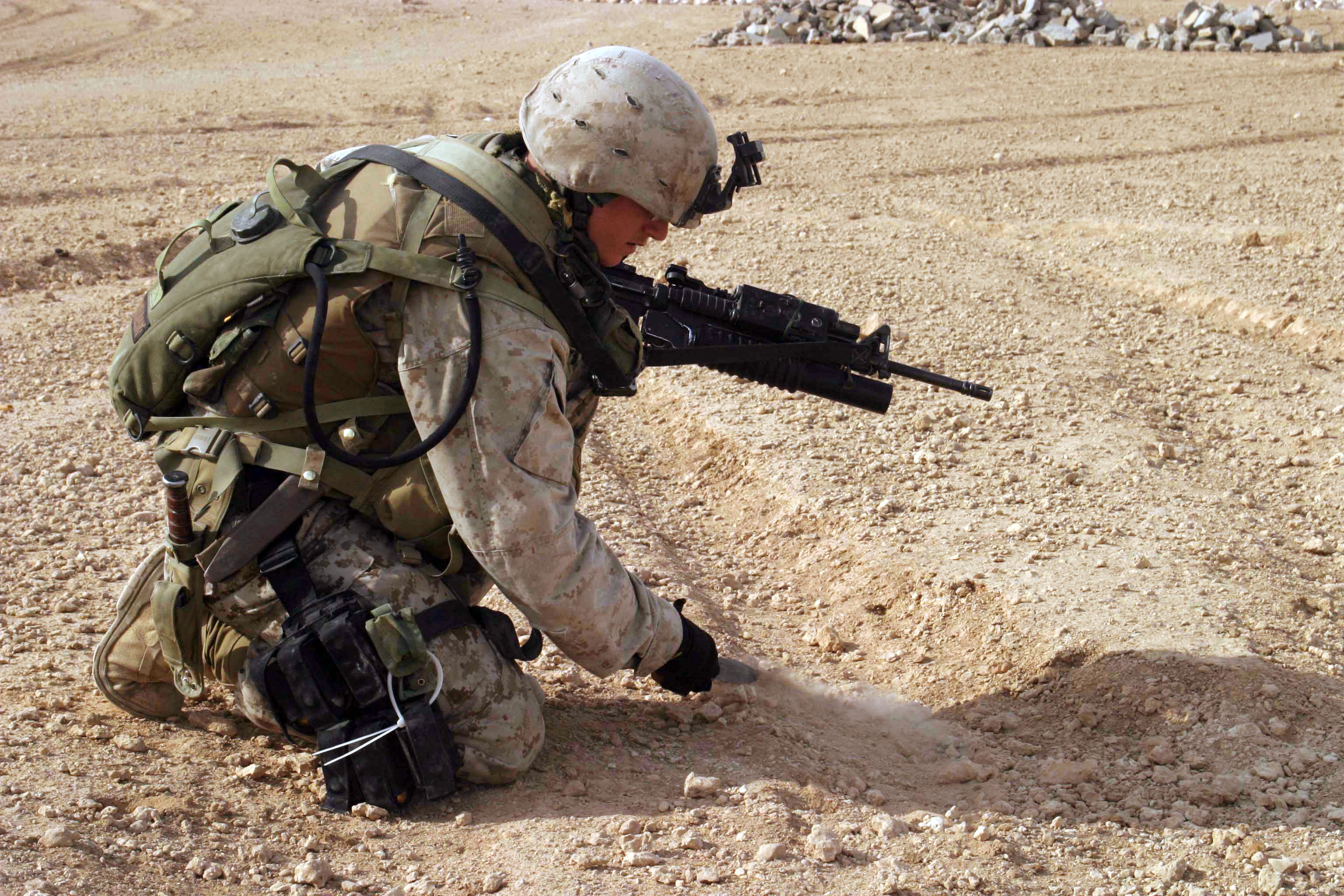
In USMC service in Iraq, 2005

Ka-Bar makes Army and Navy versions along with USMC versions. They are the same as the Marine version except for different initials at the bottom of the blade and different symbols on the sheath.

Marines today often treat the blades, guards and pommels with non-reflective black spray paint to reduce reflected light and give them additional protection against saltwater corrosion.

== Users ==
- France
  - French Airborne Forces
- Poland
  - GROM Military Unit
- United States
  - United States Army
  - United States Navy
  - United States Marine Corps

== See also ==
- M3 fighting knife
- M9 bayonet
- Mark 3 knife
- OKC-3S bayonet
- United States Marine Raider stiletto
