= Kbk wz. 91/98/23 =

karabinek wzór 91/98/23
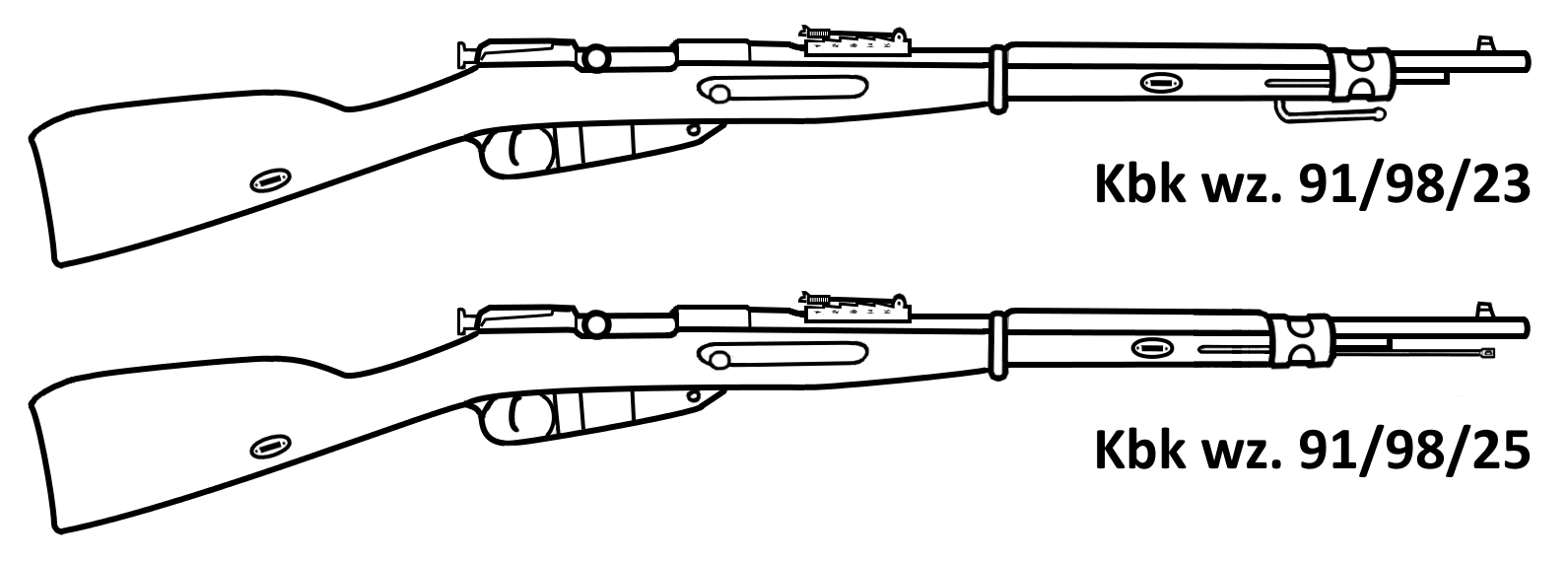
- kbk wz. 91/98/23 and kbk wz. 91/98/25 carbines
- Type: Bolt action carbine
- Place of origin: Russian Empire; Soviet Union; Poland

Service history
- In service: 1923 – 1945
- Used by: Poland; Germany (Captured pieces)
- Wars: Invasion of Poland; World War II

Production history
- Designed: February 1920
- Manufacturer: Centralna Składnica Broni; ARMA
- Produced: 1924 – 1927
- No. built: ~77,000
- Variants: see Variants

Specifications
- Mass: 3.7 kg (8.2 lb)
- Length: 100 cm (39 in)
- Barrel length: 60 cm (24 in)
- Cartridge: 7.92×57mm Mauser
- Action: Bolt action
- Rate of fire: 10 rounds/min
- Muzzle velocity: 845 m/s (2,770 ft/s)
- Sights: Rear: ladder, graduated from 300 m to 1,200 m Front: hooded fixed post (drift adjustable)

The karabinek wzór 91/98/23 (carbine pattern 1891/1898/1923), short designation kbk wz. 91/98/23, and its variants wz. 91/98/25 and wz. 91/98/26, were a Polish modification of the Mosin–Nagant M1891 rifle to carbine form. The Mosin rifle was shortened and converted to use the 7.92×57mm Mauser cartridge.

The carbine was introduced as an interim weapon in the 1920s but continued in service until Poland fell in World War II. Thereafter some were used by Germany.

== History ==
Poland captured large number of Mosin rifles of all types during the 1919-1921 Polish-Soviet War, including Russian-made rifles from Izhevsky Zavod, Tula Arms Plant and Sestroretsk Plant and American-made Mosin–Nagant rifles by Remington and New England Westinghouse. It is estimated that by 20 January 1919 roughly 20% of the rifles used by the Polish Army were Mosins; despite losses during the war there were still over 120,000 Mosin–Nagant rifles in Polish service in 1922.

Although in the early 1920s the army decided to adopt the Mauser-based kb wz. 98 rifle as the standard weapon, their supply was initially low and since both German and Ottoman Empire demonstrated during WWI it was possible to rebore captured Mosins to 7.9x57, it was decided to convert Polish rifles in the same way, shortening them to carbines in the process. Between 1924 and 1927 the Centralna Składnica Broni of Warsaw and ARMA Ltd. of Lwów modified roughly 77,000 Mosin rifles to the new standard. Some 3,000 unmodified Mosins were dispatched by SePeWe to the Spanish Republic during the Spanish Civil War aboard SS Cieszyn, the rest were sold on the civilian market, where they were used alongside a similar Belgian commercial conversion of a Mosin now known as "8 mm Blindee" among the modern collectors after their Belgian proof marks denoting that they were converted for 7.9-mm FMJ bullets.

The modifications included:

- rechambering to use 7.92×57mm Mauser ammunition, and modifying the magazine to feed the rimless cartridge
- overboring the barrels (or replacing them with new ones if needed)
- shortening the barrel by about 20 cm (7.9 in)
- shortening the barrel mounting
- replacing the Russian spike bayonet mounting with a newly designed mounting compatible with Polish and German bayonets.
- modifying the lock and bolt group, also shortening the firing pin
- modifying the sights to better suit the characteristics of the 7.9 caliber bullets
- ammo clip modified to accept the new caliber
- additional straps added to the butt and cradle

== Variants ==
The original wz. 91/98/23 utilised the original Russian spike bayonet. In 1925 the design was modified with the addition of a bayonet mounting bar to allow the use of Polish and German knife bayonets used with Mauser rifles: the German Model 84/98, and the Polish wz. 22, wz. 24 and wz. 25 bayonets. It was immediately introduced as the kbk wz. 91/98/25. A year later the design was further modified with the addition of a two-piece ejector/interrupter, similar to mechanisms used in Mauser rifles. The final version was accepted by the Armed Forces as kbk wz. 91/98/26.

Comparison
| | Mosin M1891 rifle | wz. 91/98/26 carbine |
|---|---|---|
| Cartridge | 7.62×54mmR | 7.92×57mm Mauser |
| Length | 1,306 mm (51.4 in) | 1,000 mm (39 in) |
| Loaded weight | 4.06 kg (9.0 lb) | 3.7 kg (8.2 lb) |

== Usage ==
Initially the kbk wz. 91/98/23 (and its later modifications) was pressed into Polish service as a standard service carbine of the Polish cavalry, mounted artillery and military police. It was also issued to the 80th Infantry Regiment of the 20th Infantry Division. However, by 1929 it was mostly replaced in active units with the new kbk wz. 29 carbine. The remaining guns were then supplied to the State Police, Border Guard and some units of the National Defence. At the outbreak of World War II and the German and Soviet invasion of Poland there were still some 76,400 pieces left in Polish inventory, most of them were destroyed during the war.
