= Knife bayonet =

Knife which can be used as a bayonet

A knife bayonet is a knife which can be used both as a bayonet, combat knife, or utility knife as a cutting and thrusting tool or weapon. The knife bayonet became the almost universal form of bayonet in the 20th century due to its versatility and effectiveness.

== History ==
Spike bayonets proved useless when separated from the rifle and ineffective in trench warfare; and while versatile, sword bayonets proved to be impractical weapons in trench warfare because of their overall length.

The first knife bayonet to see widespread service was the 10 inch (25.4 cm) blade Seitengewehr 1871/84, which became the standard German infantry bayonet in 1884. Its derivative, the Seitengewehr 1884/98, would go on in use until 1945 in German service.

== Design ==
The knife bayonets are basically fighting knives or utility knives with a lug and/or muzzle ring to attach to the barrel of a firearm such as an assault rifle, submachine gun, or combat shotgun.

Almost all bayonets today are knife bayonets that are designed for use in hand-to-hand fighting and as utility knives. Some have serrated back edges to enhanced its cutting utility and to be usable as wire cutters (when used in conjunction with fittings on the sheath).

Modern knife bayonets have 6 inch (15.24 cm) to 8 inch (20.3 cm) long and .75 (1.905 cm) inch to 1.5 (3.81 cm) inch wide blades, and are often fullered. They have been tempered for durability so as not to bend or break when twisting; this was often the problem with long and slender spike bayonets.

Today's bayonets often double as multi-purpose utility knives, bottle openers or other tools. Issuing one modern multi-purpose bayonet/knife is also more cost effective than issuing separate speciality bayonets, and field or combat knives.

== Usage ==
While bayonets are rarely used in modern combat, it remains standard issue in armies, concluding that the bayonet serves as a useful training aid in building morale and increasing desired aggressiveness in troops.

=== Soviet Union ===
The original AK-47 has an adequate but unremarkable bayonet. However, the AKM Type I bayonet (introduced in 1959) was an improvement of the original design.

It has a Bowie style (clip-point) blade with saw-teeth along the spine, and can be used as a multi-purpose survival knife and wire-cutter when combined with its steel scabbard.

The AK-74 bayonet 6Kh5 (introduced in 1983) represents a further refinement of the AKM bayonet. It introduced a radical blade cross-section, that has a flat milled on one side near the edge and a corresponding flat milled on the opposite side near the false edge.

The blade has a new spear point and an improved one-piece moulded plastic grip, making it a more effective fighting knife.

It also has saw-teeth on the false edge and the usual hole for use as a wire-cutter.

The wire cutting versions of the AK bayonets each have an electrically insulated handle and an electrically insulated part of the scabbard, so it can be used to cut an electrified wire.

=== United States ===
The American M16 rifle used the M7 bayonet which is based on earlier designs such as the M4, M5 and M6 models, all of which are direct descendants of the M3 Fighting Knife and have a spear-point blade with a half sharpened secondary edge.

The newer M9 has a clip-point blade with saw-teeth along the spine, and can be used as a multi-purpose knife and wire-cutter when combined with its scabbard. It can even be used by troops to cut their way free through the relatively thin metal skin of a crashed helicopter or airplane.

The current USMC OKC-3S bayonet bears a resemblance to the Marines' iconic Ka-Bar fighting knife with serrations near the handle.

=== People's Republic of China ===
The Type 56 assault rifle includes the copy of an integral folding spike bayonet, similar to the SKS rifle or for some models, that of the AKM Type II bayonet. The QBZ-95, has a multi-purpose knife bayonet similar to the US M9.

=== Belgium ===
The FN FAL has two types of bayonet. The first is a traditional spear point bayonet. The second is the Type C socket bayonet introduced in the 1960s.

It has a hollow handle that fits over the muzzle and slots that lined up with those on the FAL's 22 mm NATO-spec flash hider. Its spear-type blade is offset to the side of the handle to allow the bullet to pass beside the blade.

=== United Kingdom ===
The current British L3A1 socket bayonet is based on the FN FAL Type C socket bayonet with a clip-point blade.

It has a hollow handle that fits over the SA80/L85 rifle's muzzle and slots that lined up with those on the flash eliminator. The blade is offset to the side of the handle to allow the bullet to pass beside the blade.

It can also be used as a multi-purpose knife and wire-cutter when combined with its scabbard. The scabbard also has a sharpening stone and folding saw blade.

The use of contemporary bayonets by the British army was noted during the Afghanistan war in 2004. Traditionally, bayonets are instead called swords in The Rifles.

=== Germany ===
The H&K G3 rifle uses two types of bayonets, both of which is mounted above the G3's rifle barrel.

The first is the standard G3 bayonet which has a blade similar to the American M7 bayonet.

The second is an Eickhorn KCB-70 type multi-purpose knife bayonet, featuring a clip-point with saw-back, a wire-cutter scabbard and a distinctive squared handgrip.

After the German reunification, there was little use of modified AKM type II knife bayonets from stocks of the former Nationale Volksarmee (National People's Army) of East Germany, for the H&K G36 rifle.

The original muzzle-ring was cut away and a new, large diameter muzzle ring welded in place. The original leather belt hanger was replaced by a complex web and plastic belt hanger designed to fit the West German load bearing equipment.

=== Austria ===
The Steyr AUG uses two types of bayonet. The first and most common is an Eickhorn KCB-70 type multi-purpose bayonet with an M16 bayonet type interface.

The second are the Glock FM78 (German: Feldmesser 78, lit. 'Field Knife 78') and the FM81 (German: Feldmesser 81), which can also be used as a bayonet, by engaging a socket in the pommel (covered by a plastic cap) into a bayonet adapter that can be fitted to the AUG rifle.

These bayonets are noteworthy, as they were meant to be used primarily as field or survival knives and use as a bayonet was a secondary consideration. They can also be used as throwing knives and have a built-in bottle opener in the crossguard.

=== France ===
The French use a more traditional spear point bayonet with the current FAMAS bayonet which is nearly identical to that of the M1949/56 bayonet.

The new French H&K 416F rifle uses the Eickhorn "SG 2000 WC-F", a multi-purpose combat knife/bayonet (similar to the KM2000) with a wire cutter.

It weighs 320 g (0.7 lb), is 30.0 cm (11.8 in) long with a half serrated 17.3 cm (6.8 in) blade for cutting through ropes. The synthetic handle and sheath have electrical insulation that protects up to 10,000 volts. The sheath also has a diamond blade sharpener.

== Gallery ==
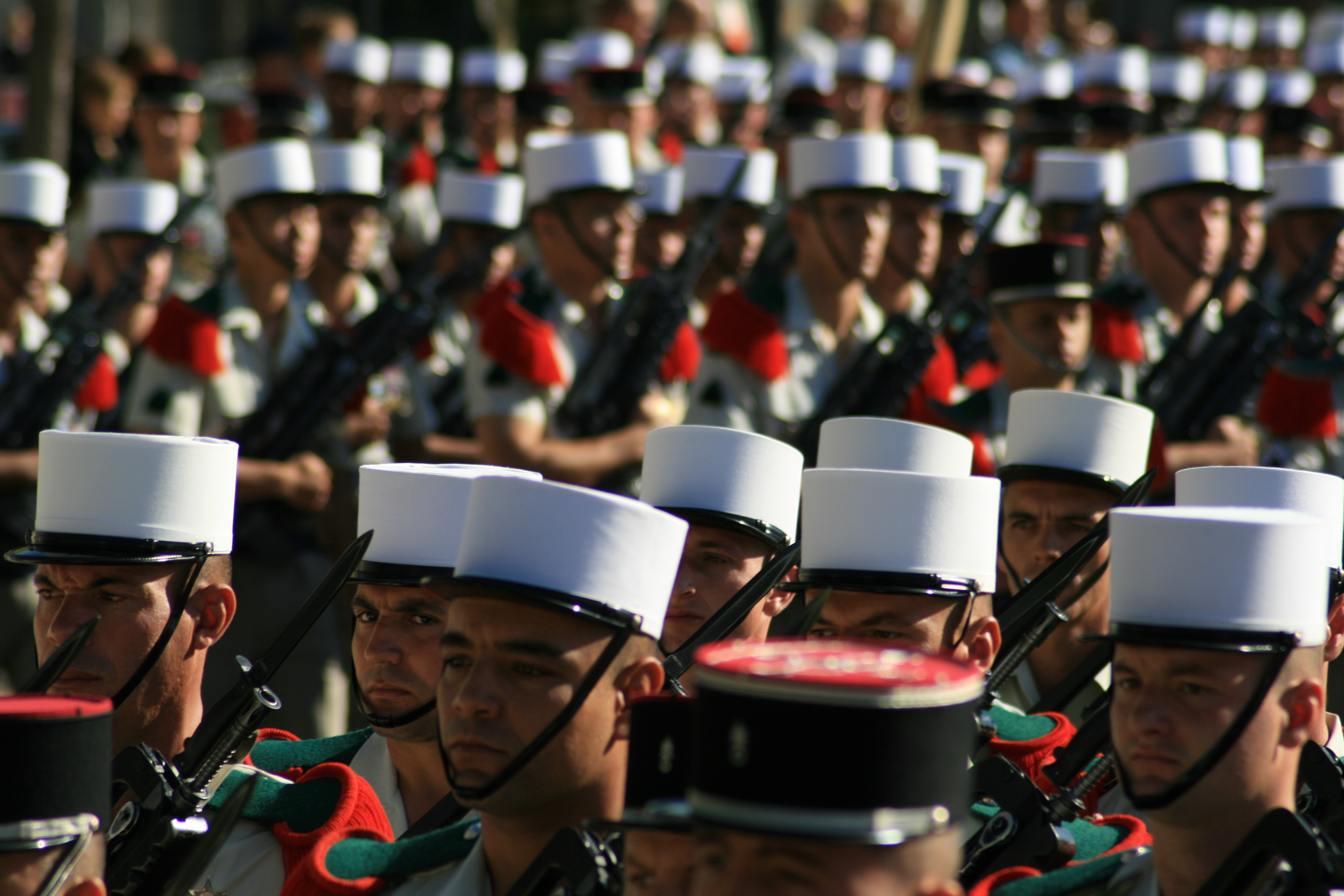
Legionnaires of the French Military with FAMAS rifles and fixed bayonets.

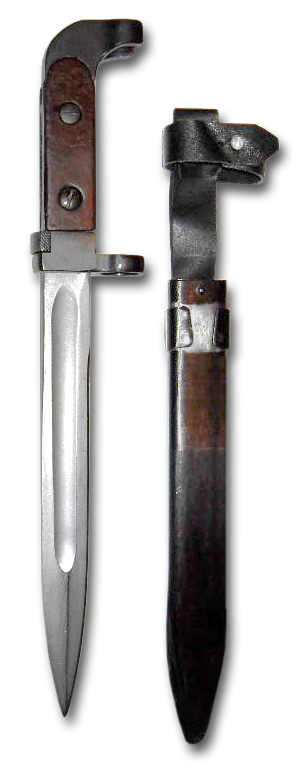
Soviet AK-47 bayonet and scabbard.

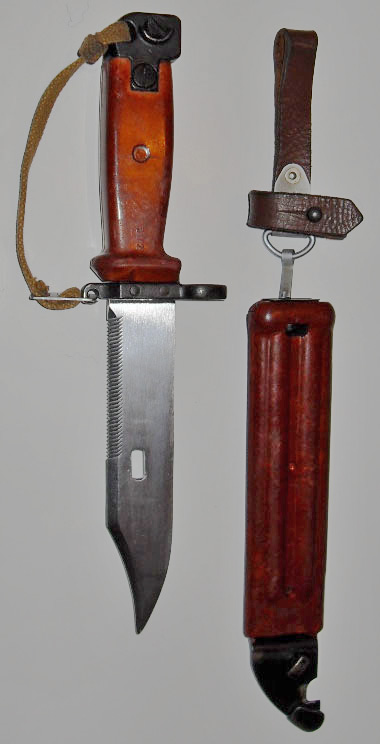
Soviet AKM type II bayonet, multi-purpose knife and wire-cutter when combined with its scabbard.

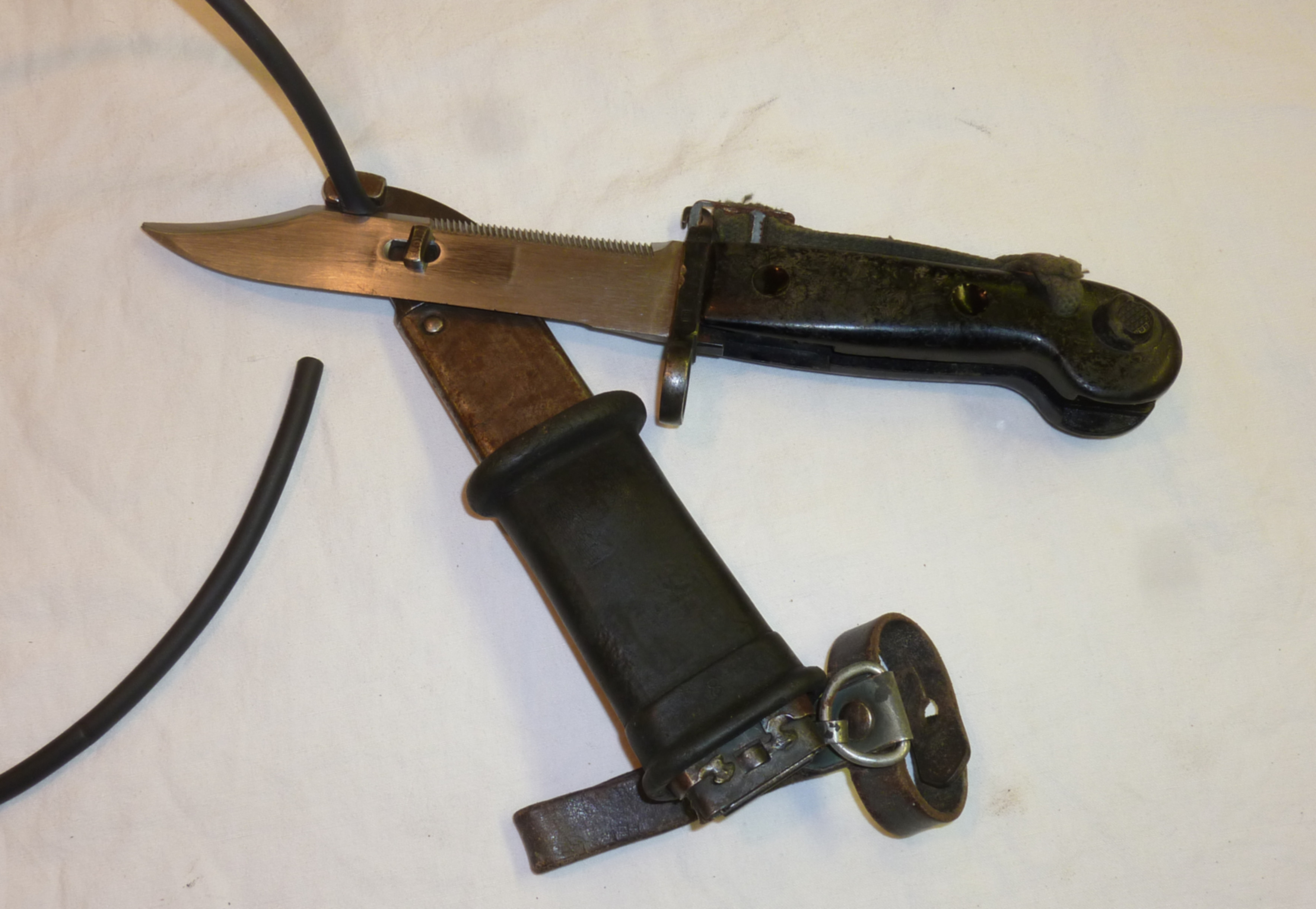
Multi-purpose AKM Type I bayonet of the Nationale Volksarmee shown cutting a wire

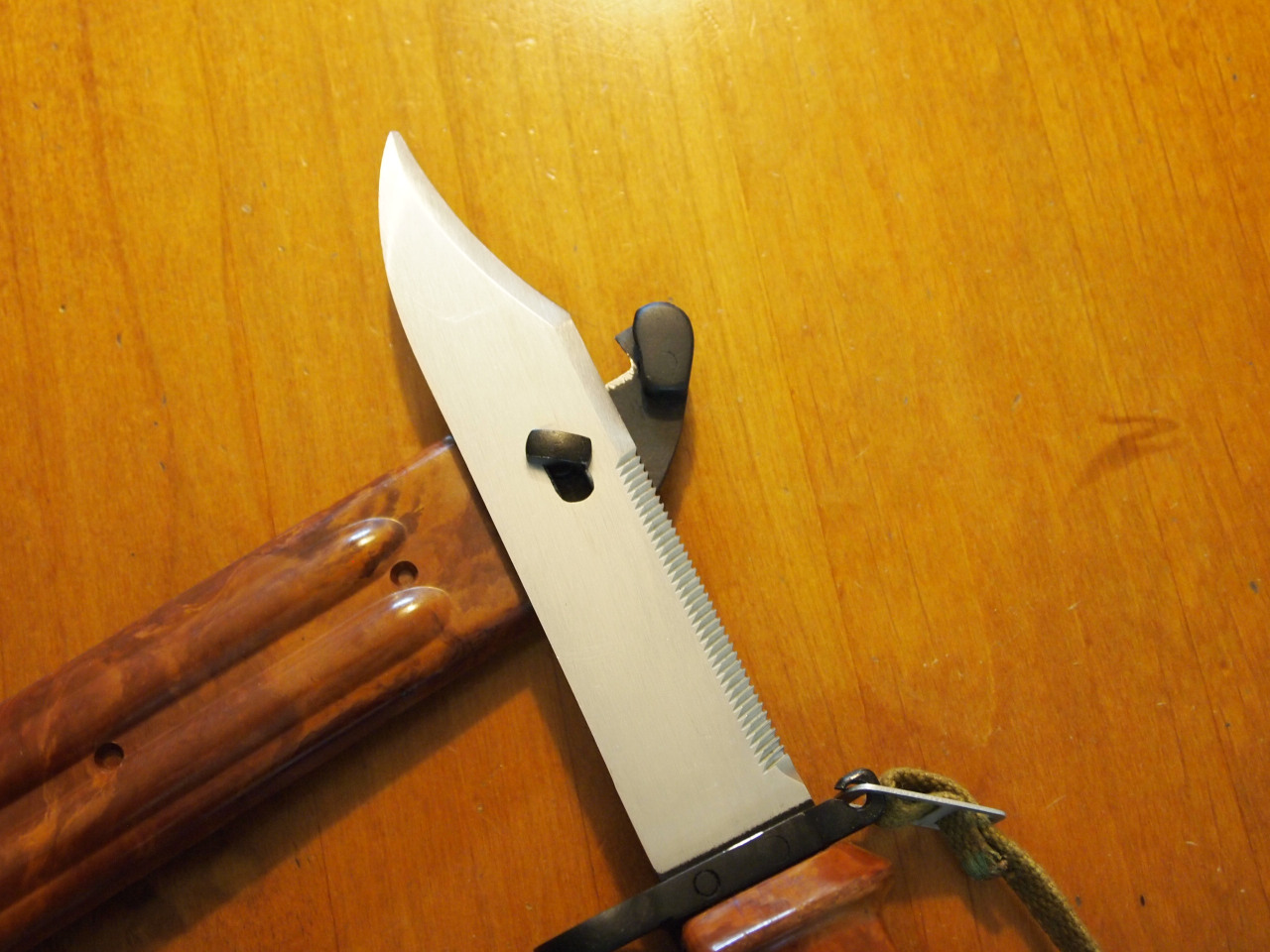
Soviet AKM type II bayonet and scabbard in wire-cutter configuration.

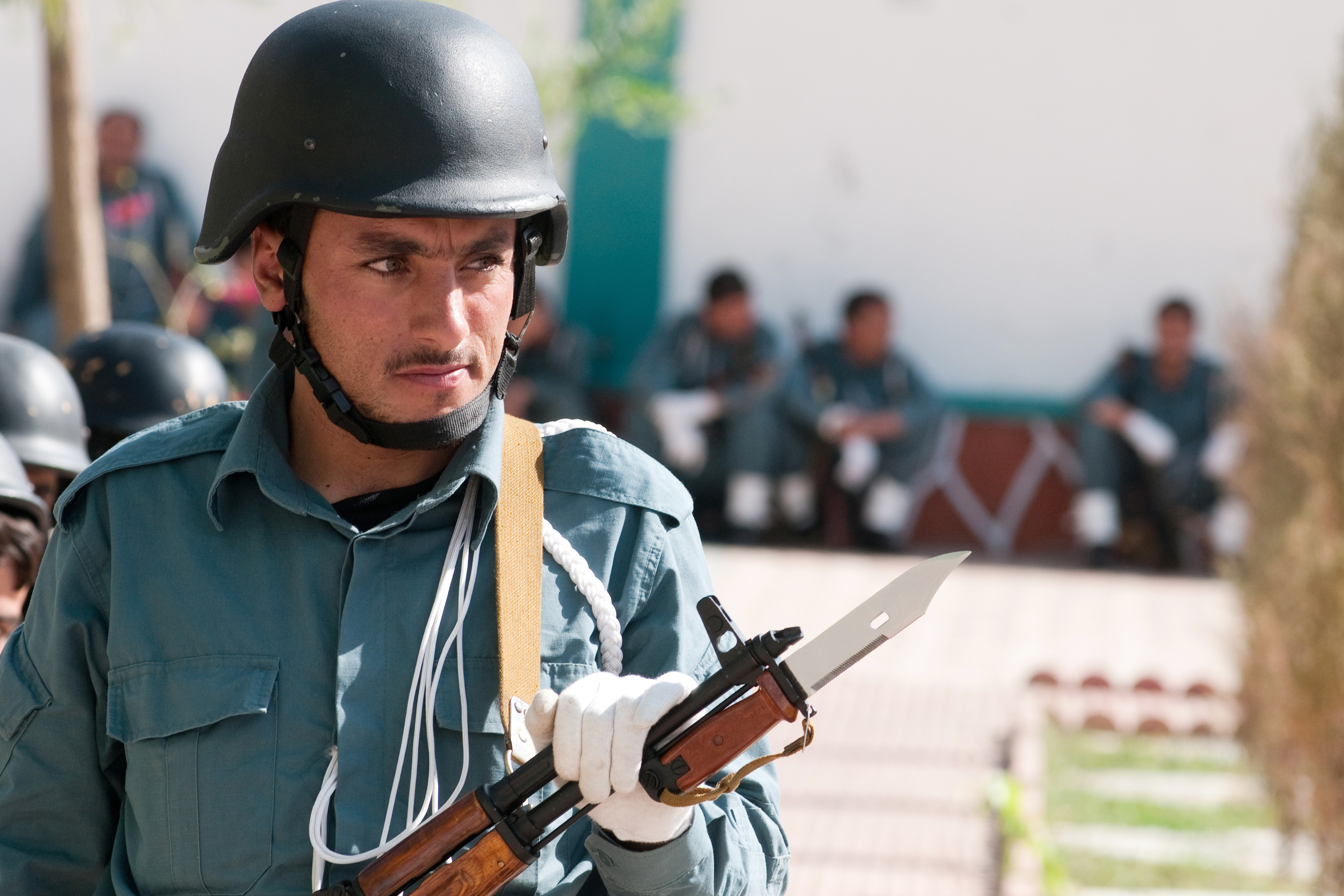
Afghan policeman with AKM and AKM Type II bayonet.

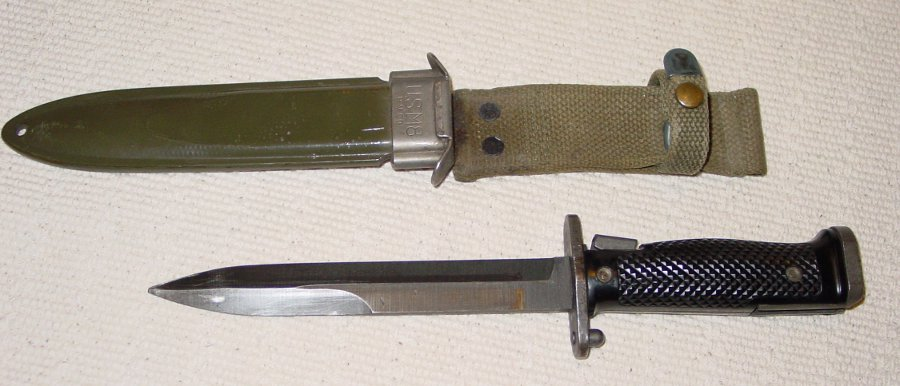
The US M5 bayonet and scabbard used with the M1 Garand

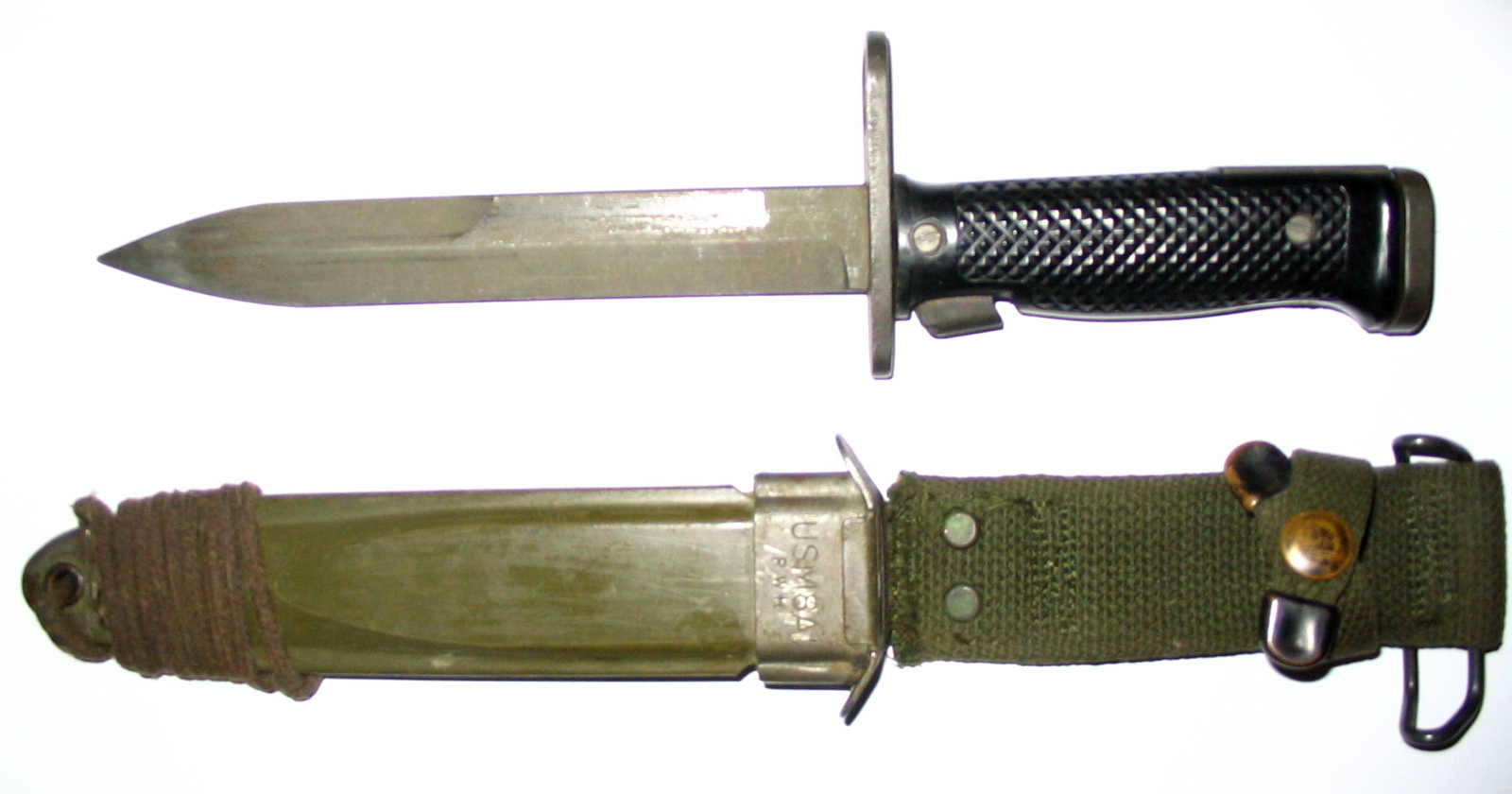
The US M6 bayonet and scabbard used with the M14 rifle

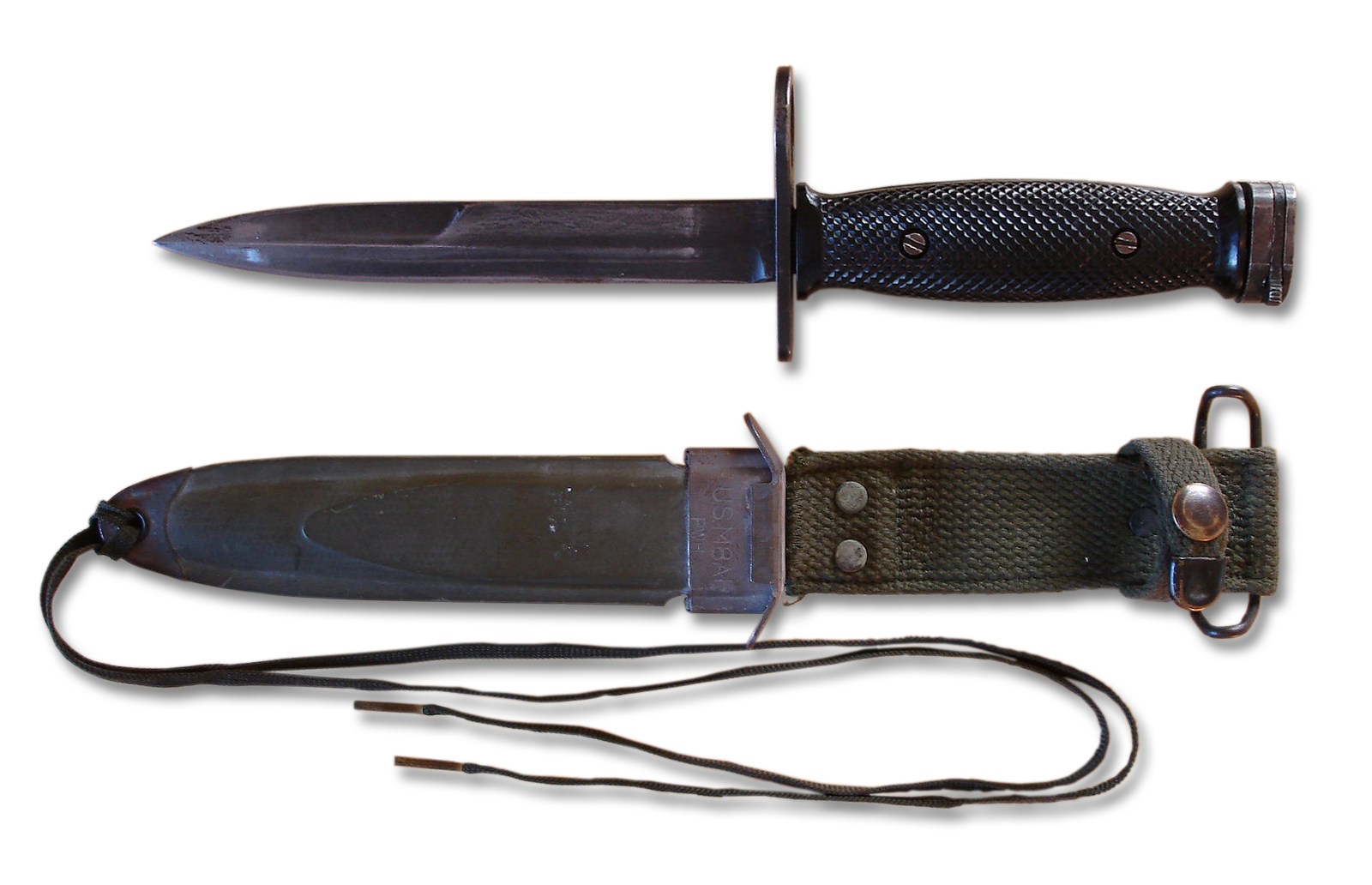
M7 Bayonet and M8A1 Sheath used with the M16 rifle

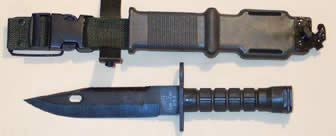
Adopted in 1986, the US M9 bayonet and scabbard used with the M16 rifle and M4 carbine.

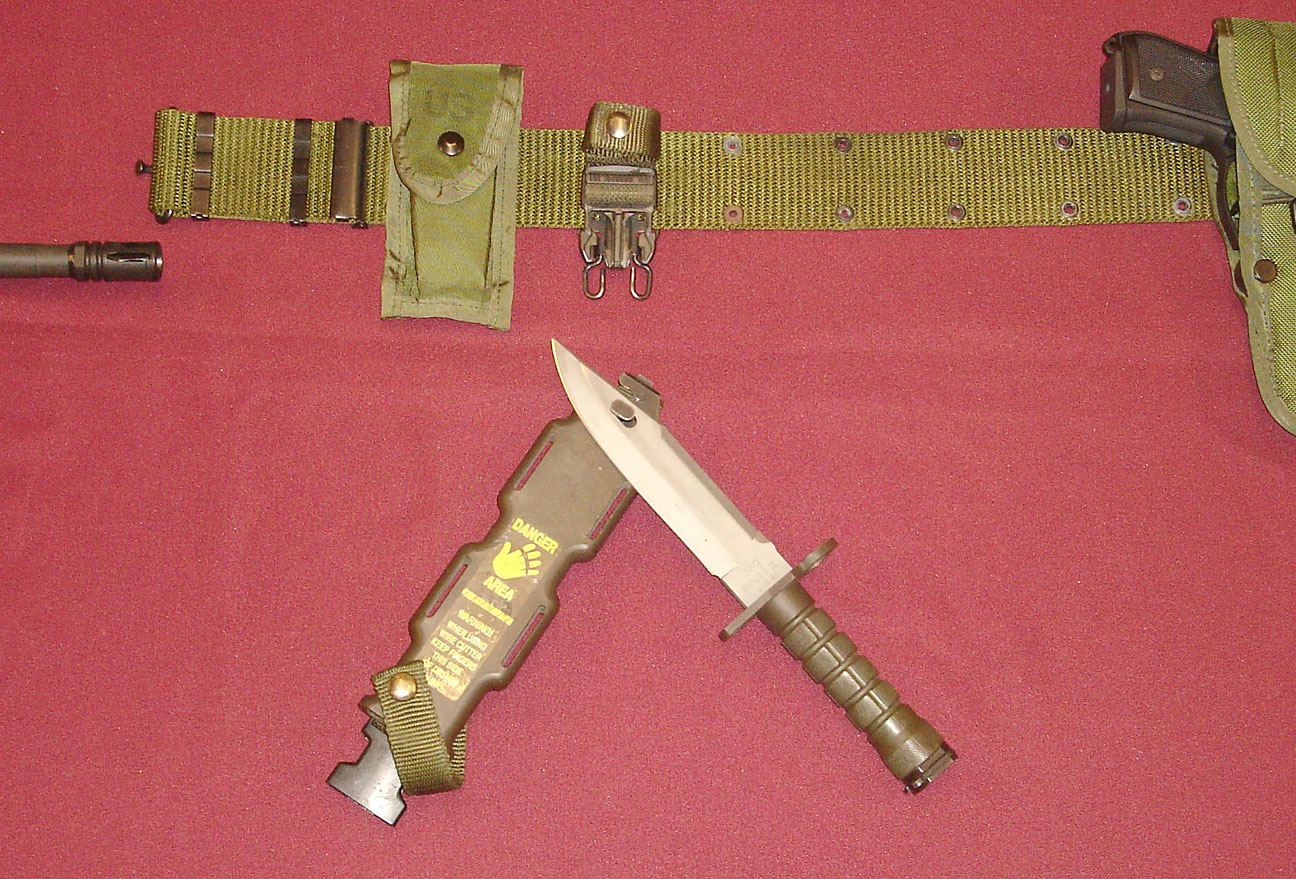
M9 bayonet and scabbard in wire-cutter configuration.

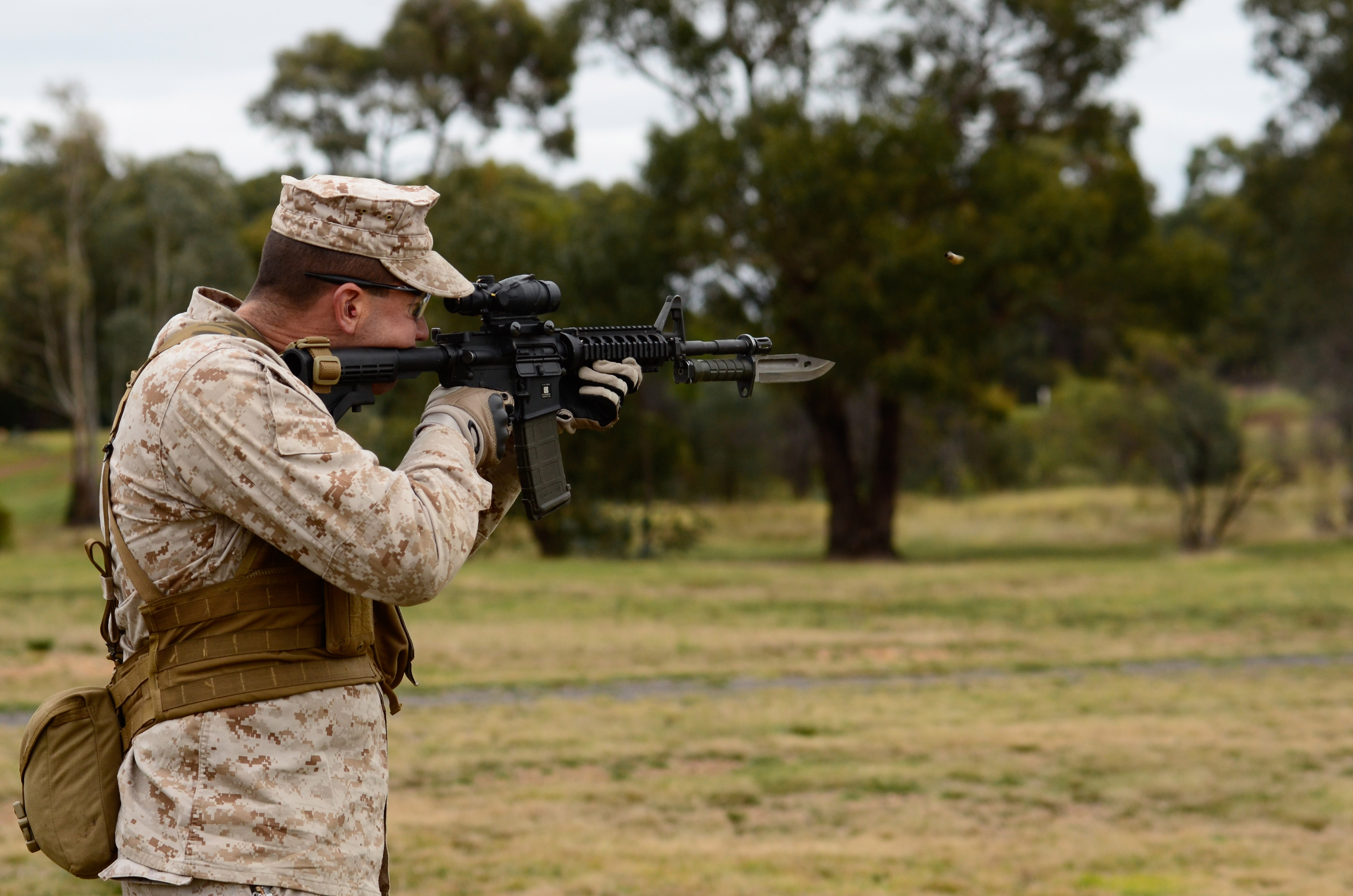
M9 bayonet-fitted M4 carbine firing during secondary target drills.

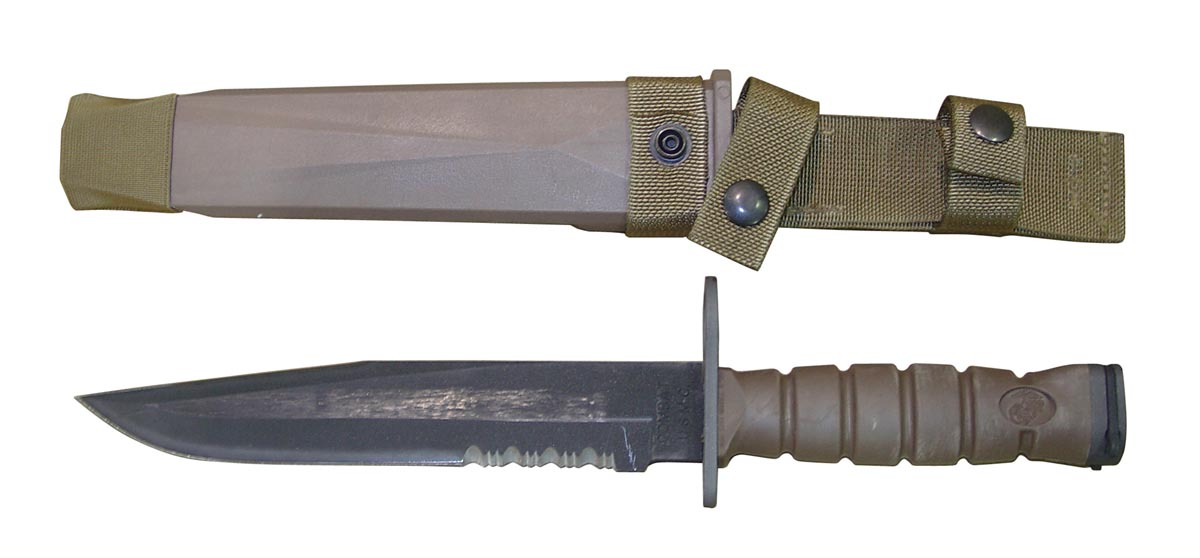
The USMC OKC-3S Bayonet

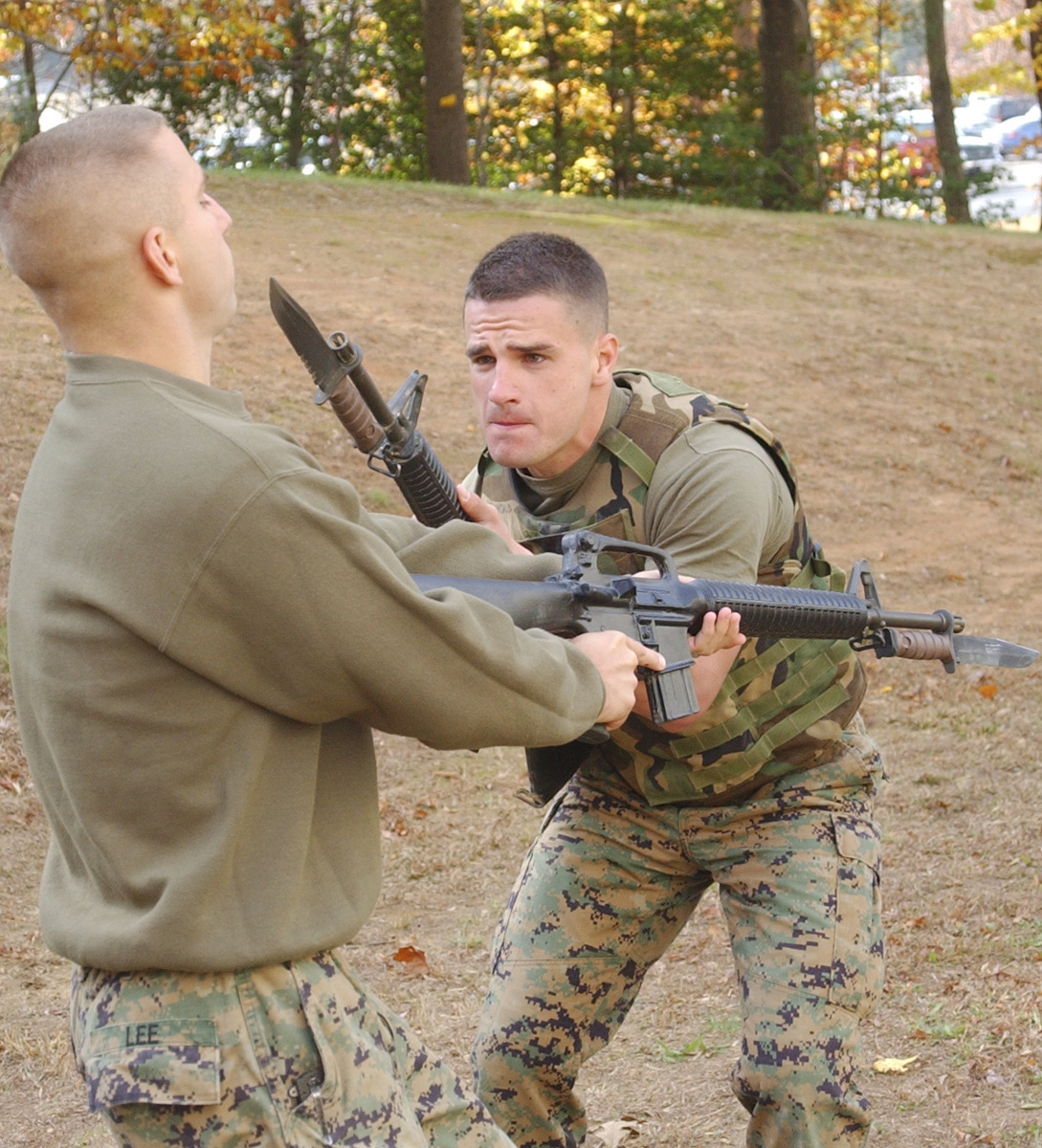
US Marines at bayonet practice in 2005.

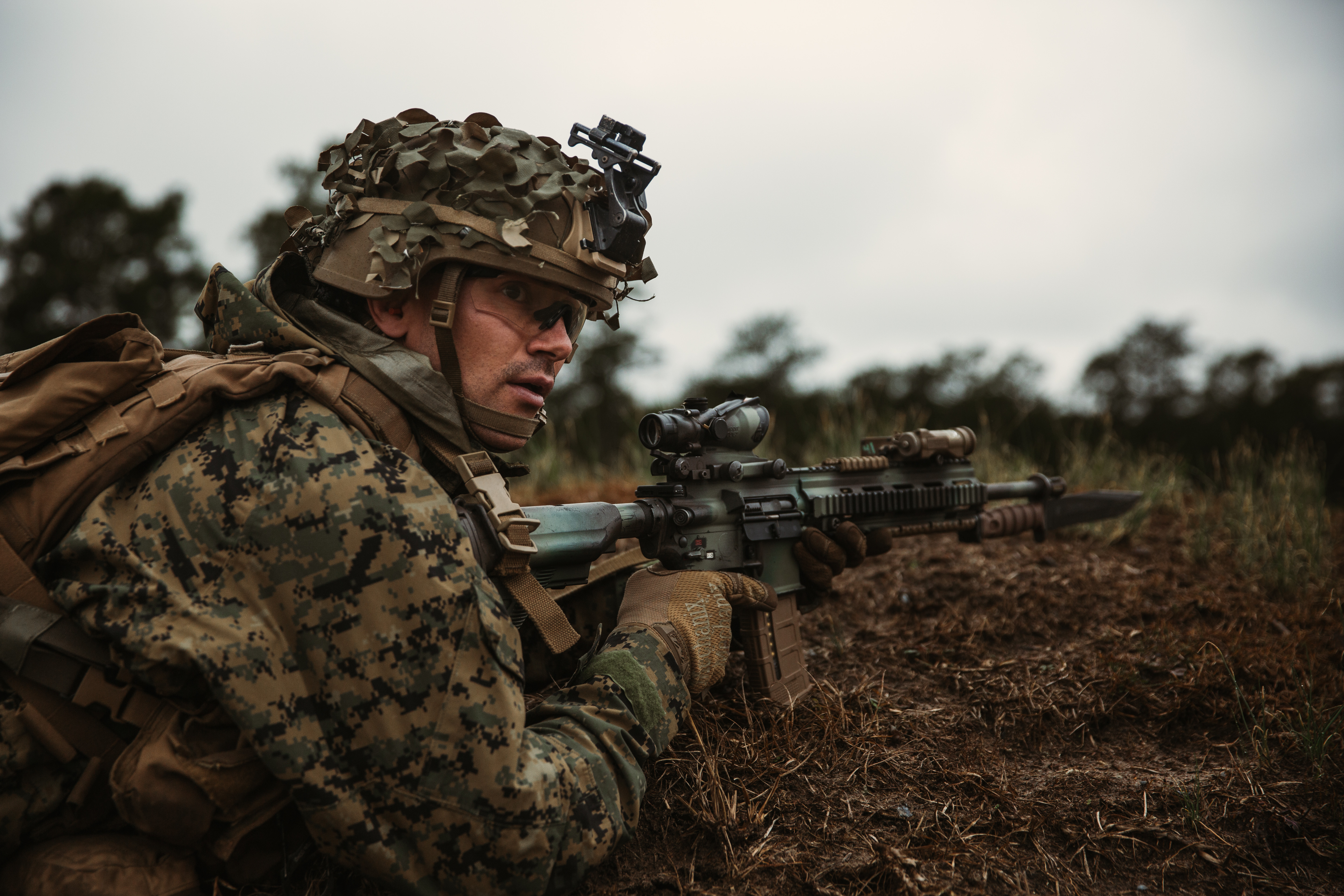
US Marine with OKC-3S attached to an M27 IAR in 2023. The USMC is one of only a few modern military forces to still teach bayonet fighting as part of basic training.

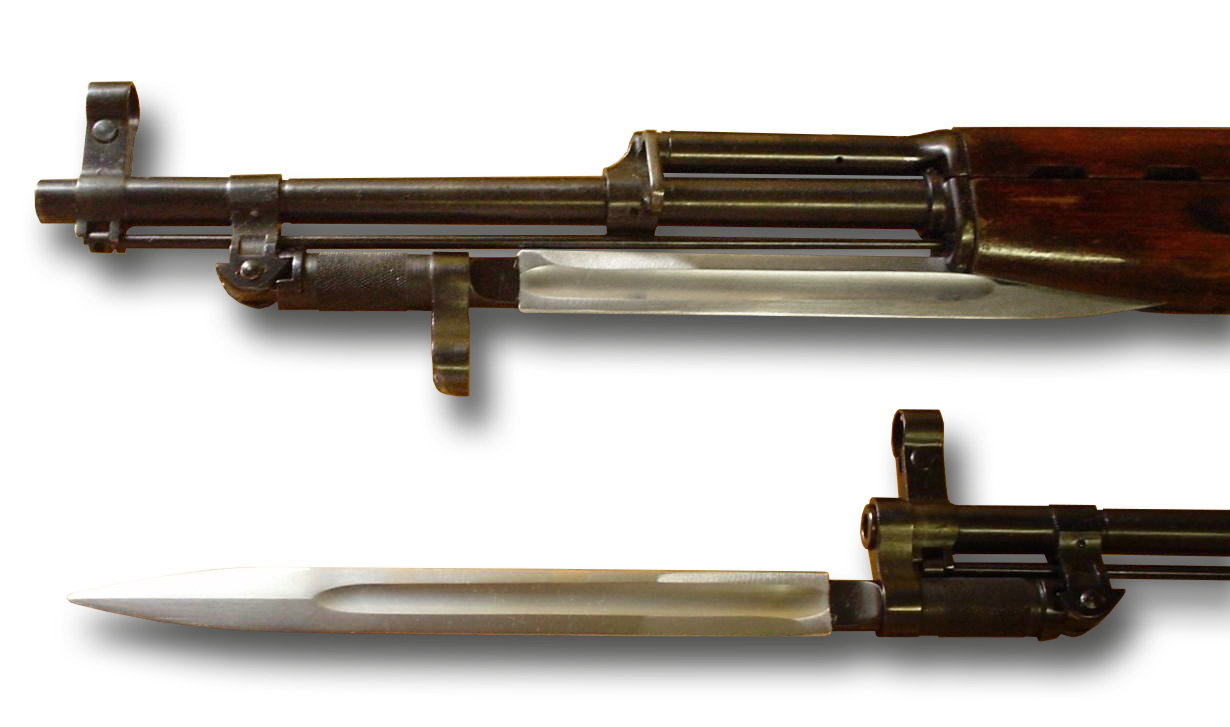
Folding an SKS-type bayonet.

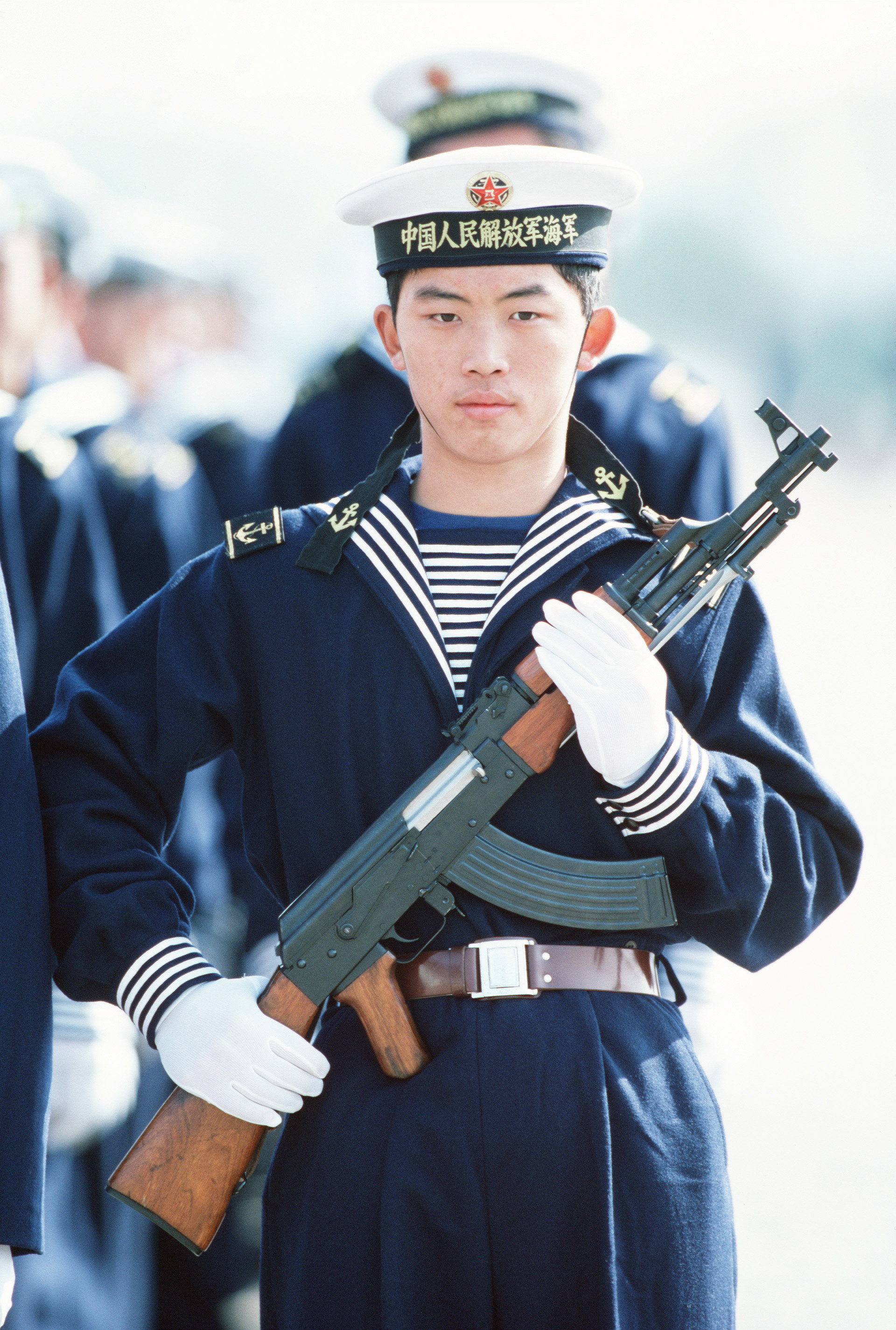
A Chinese sailor with a Type 56 with the integral folding spike bayonet, 1986.

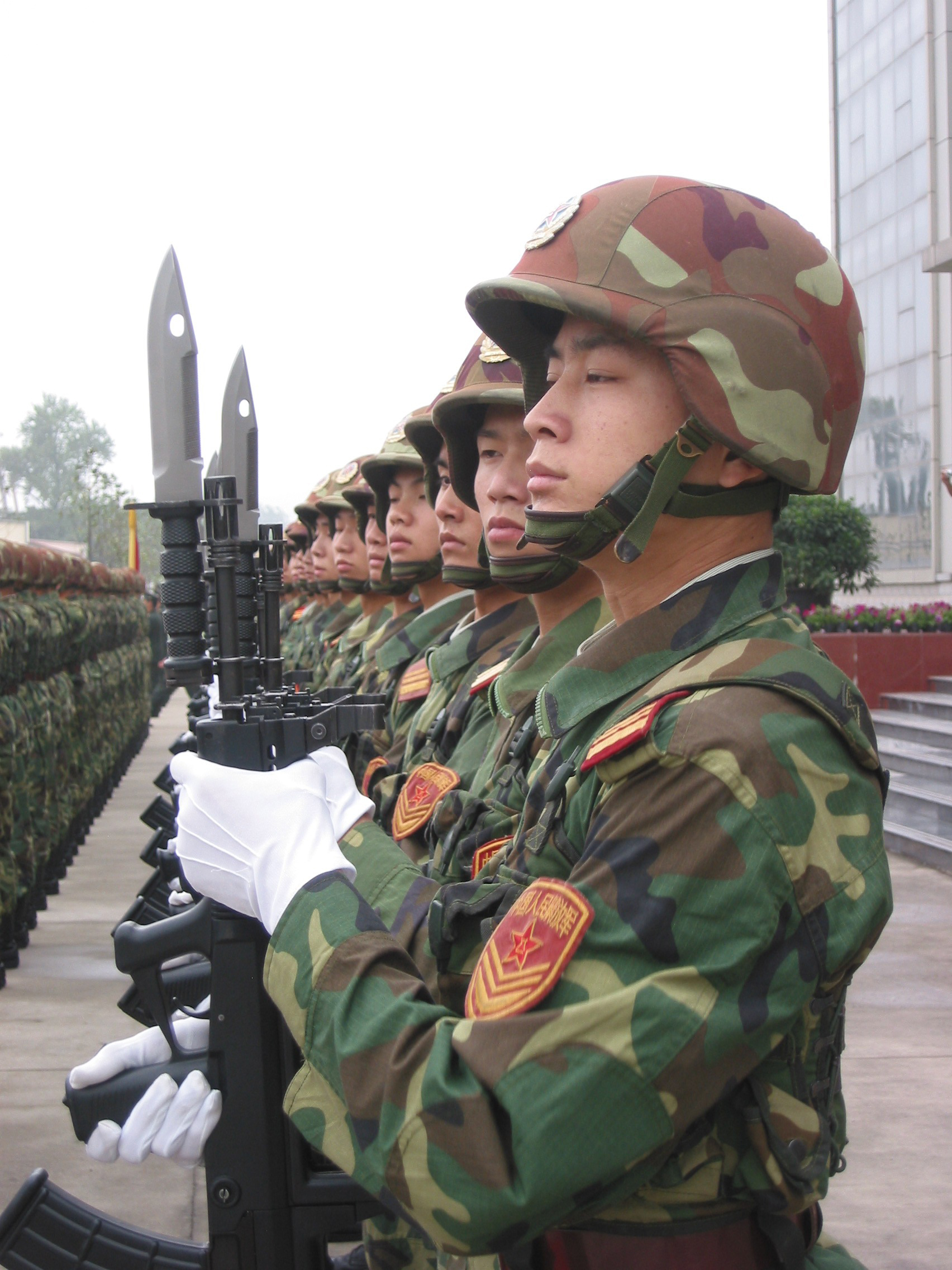
Chinese soldier with QBZ-95 rifle and multi-purpose knife bayonet.

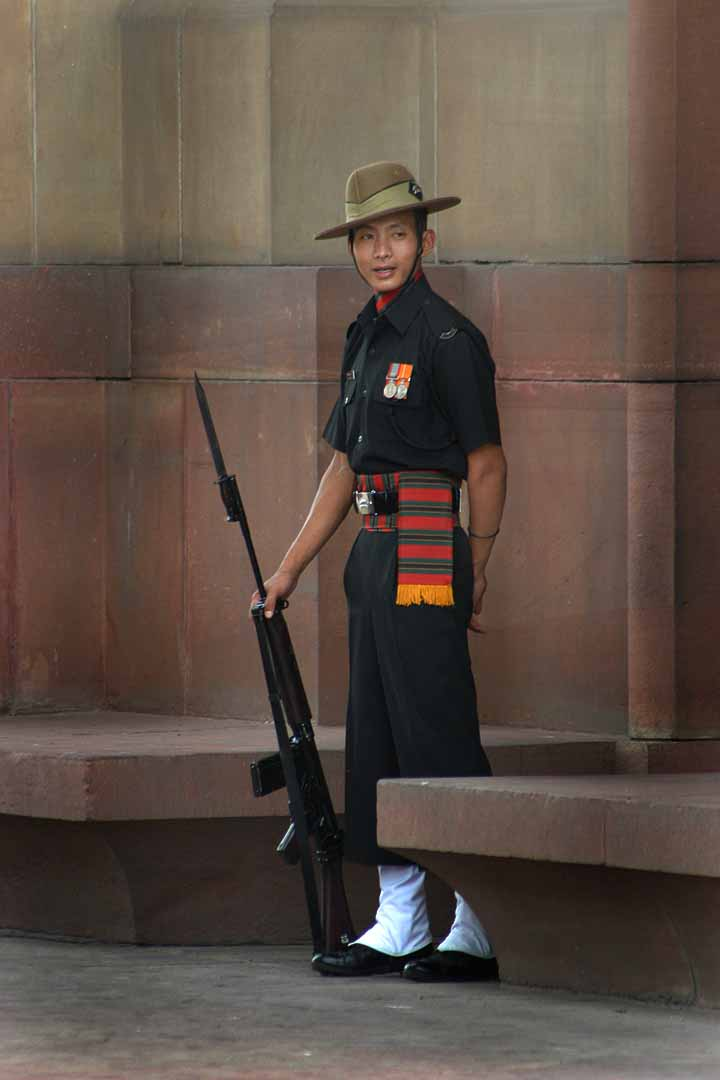
Indian Army Gurkha with L1A1 (FN FAL) and traditional bayonet.

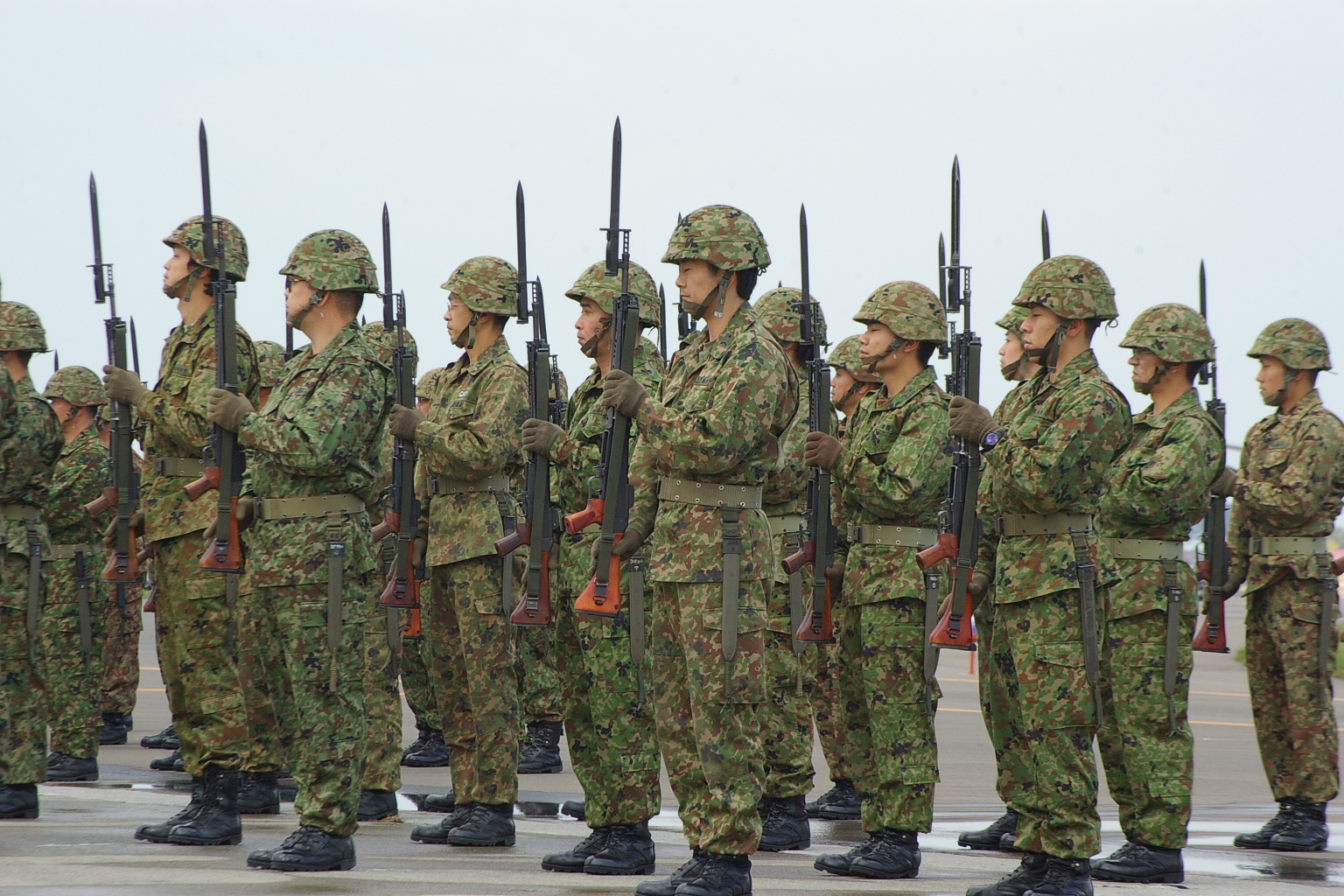
Japanese Ground Self Defense Force infantrymen with their Howa Type 64 with bayonet fixed.

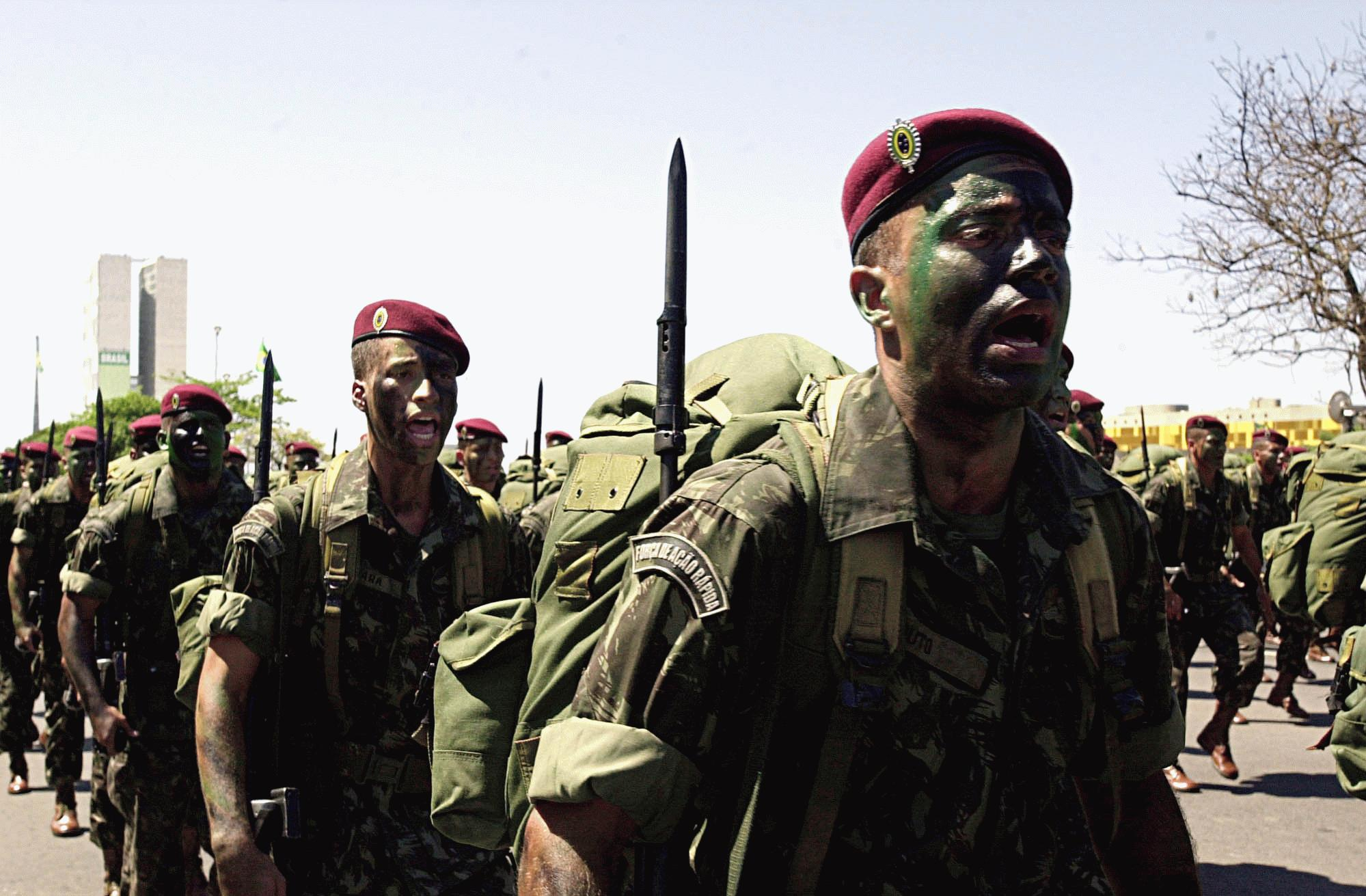
Brazilian Army paratroopers with FN FAL rifles with Type C socket bayonets on parade.

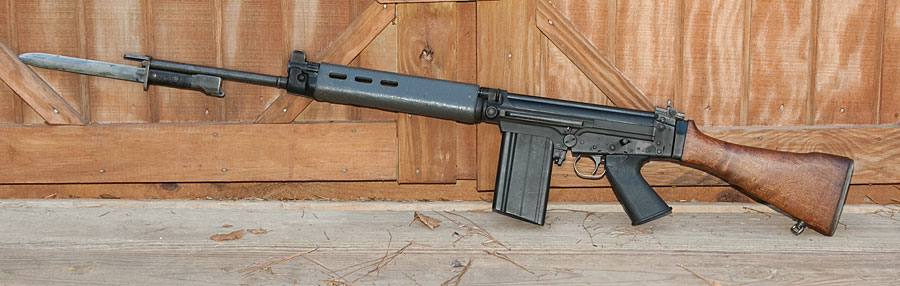
Early FN FAL and bayonet.

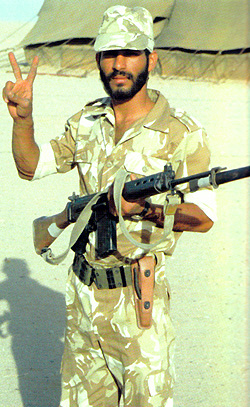
Kuwaiti soldier with his FN FAL rifle with bayonet.

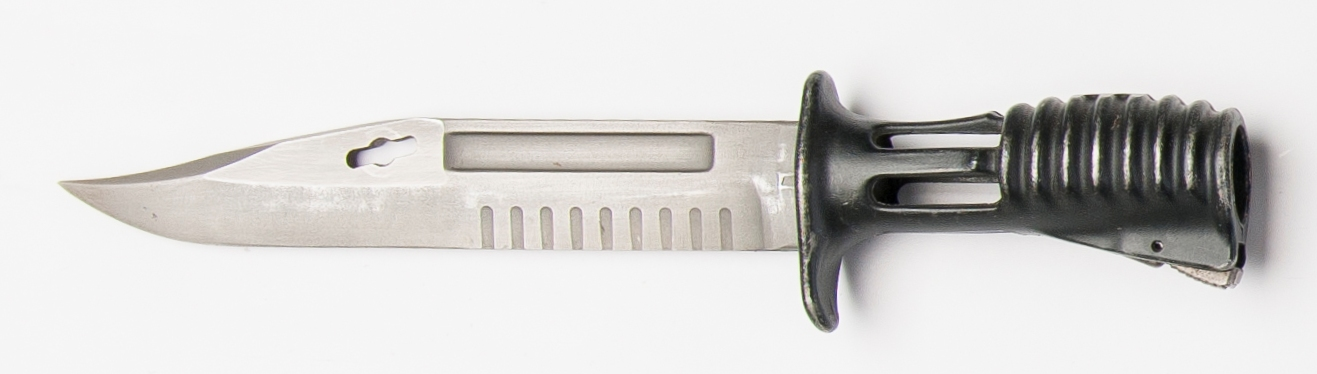
British-issue L3A1 socket bayonet. Note the slot in the blade to attach the wire-cutter scabbard.

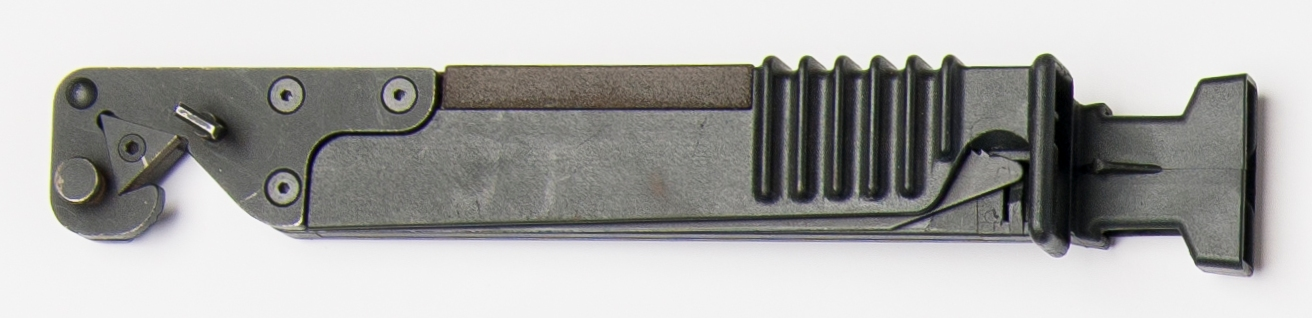
L3A1 scabbard. Note the lug to attach the bayonet for wire cutting.

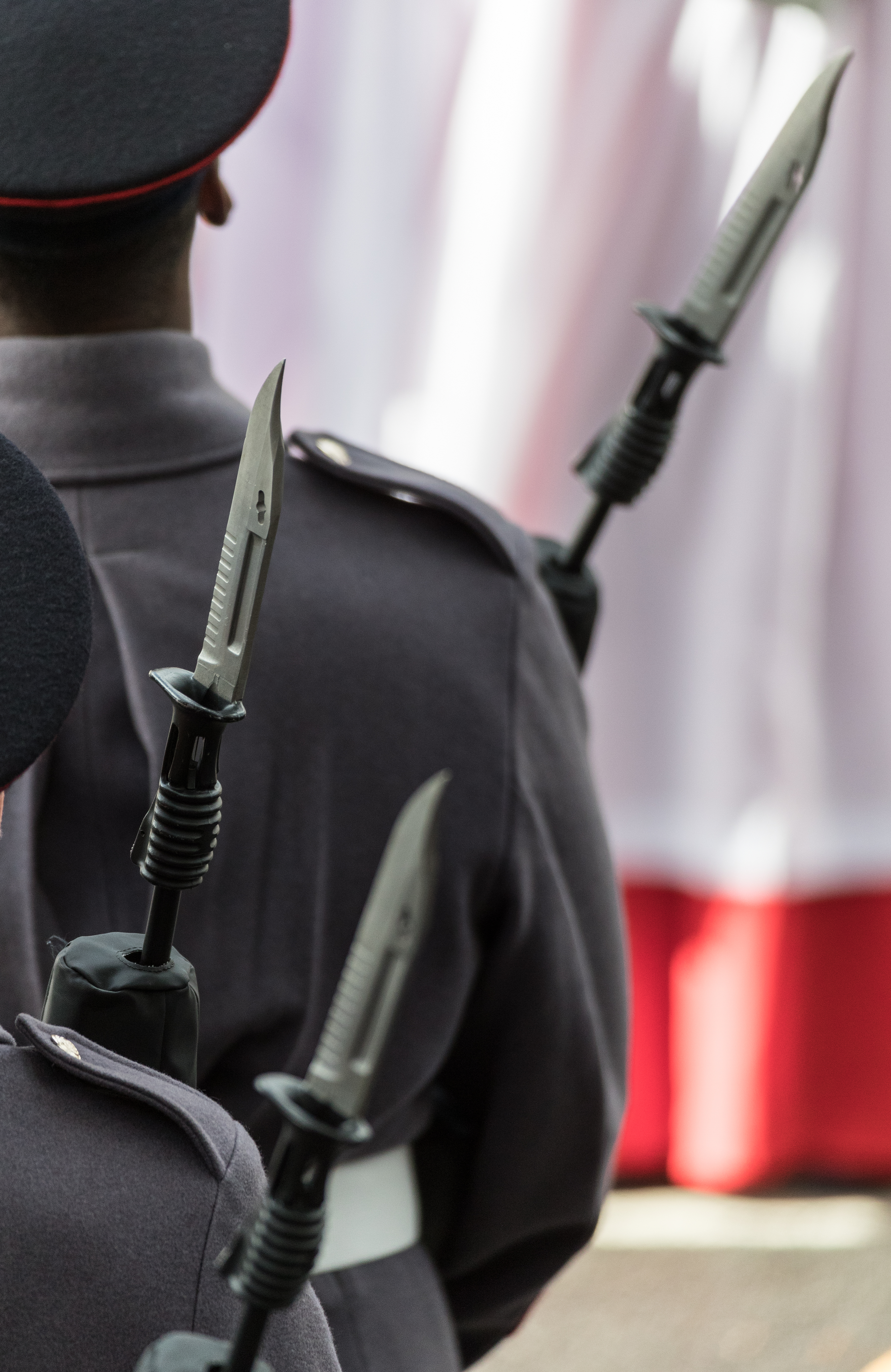
British servicemen with fixed L3A1 bayonets on L85A2 rifles. The L3A1's blade is offset to permit firing.

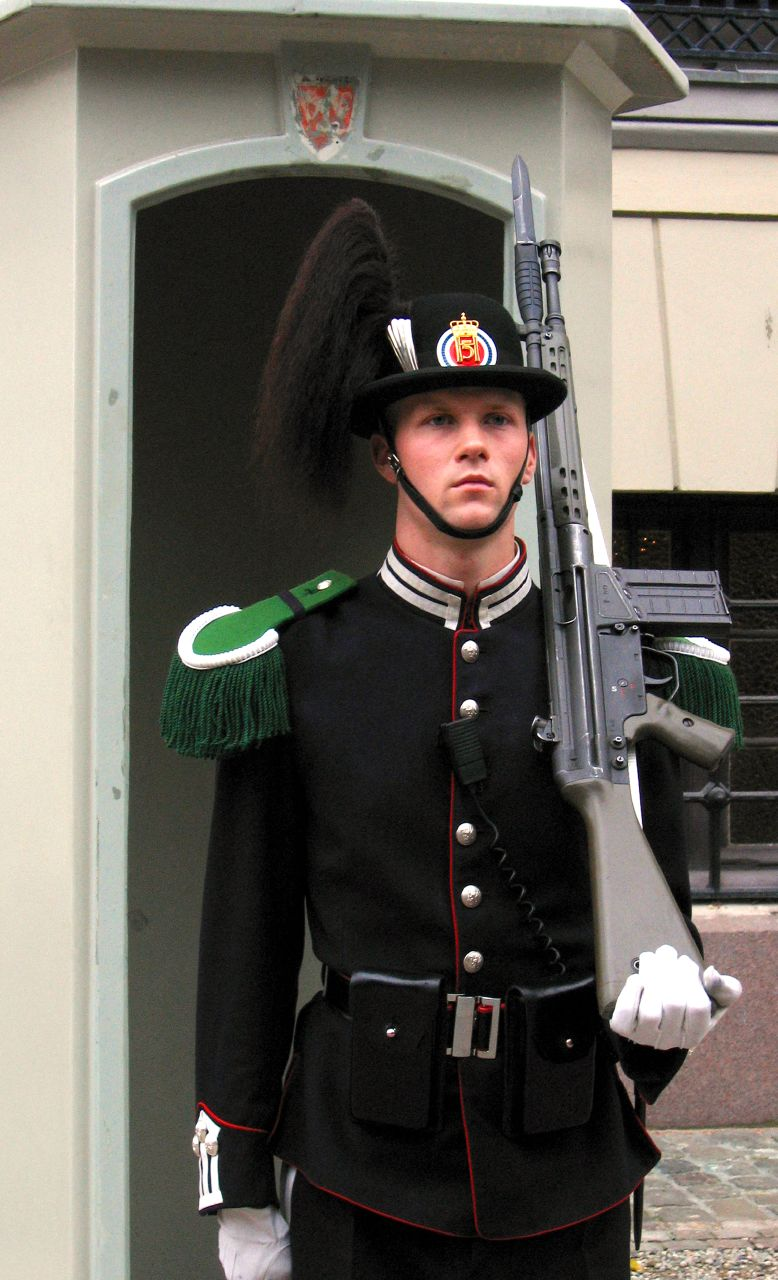
Palace guard at the royal palace, Oslo. Note the G3-type rifle with a bayonet over the barrel.

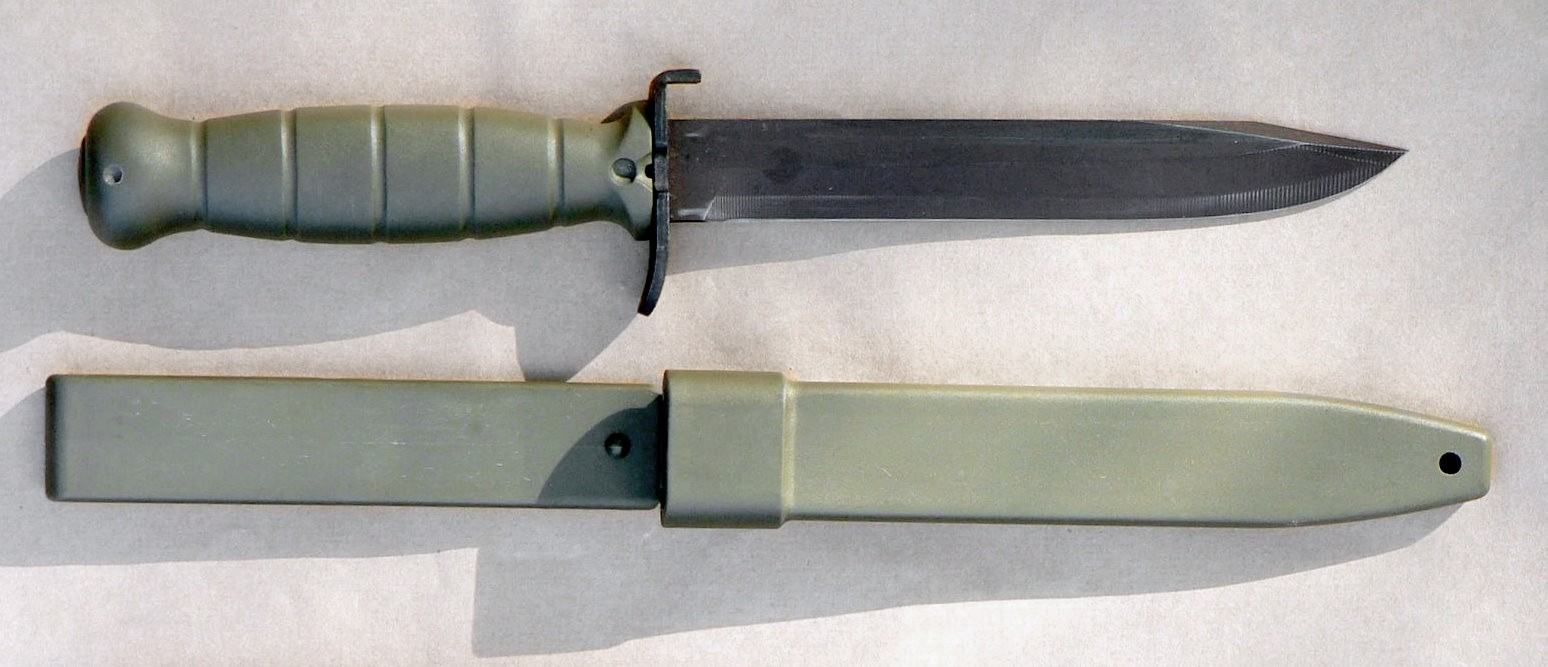
Glock field knife/bayonet and its scabbard. The upper crossguard is bent forward and can be used as a bottle opener.

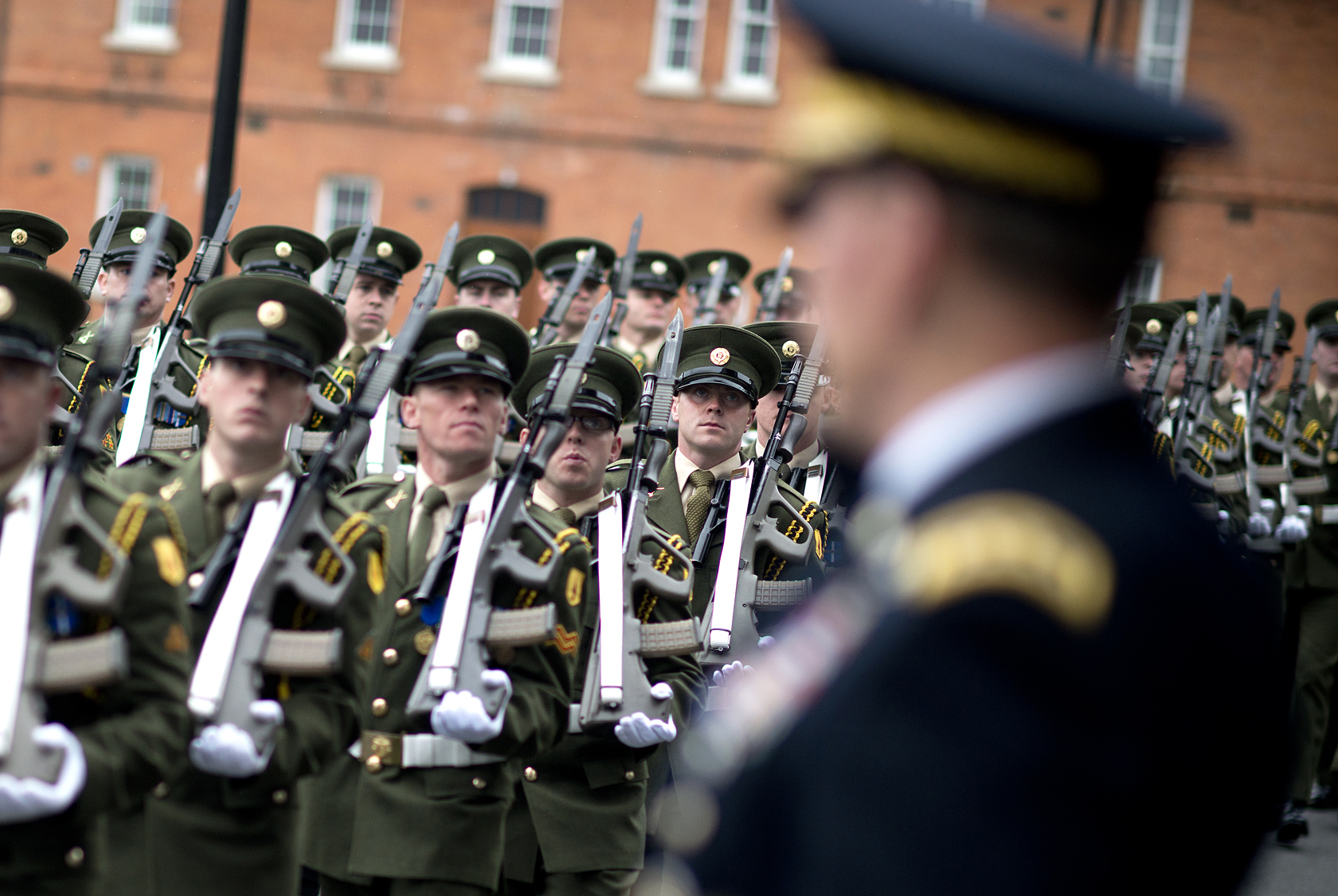
Irish Army Honor Guard. Note Steyr AUG with EICKHORN KCB-70 type multi-purpose bayonet

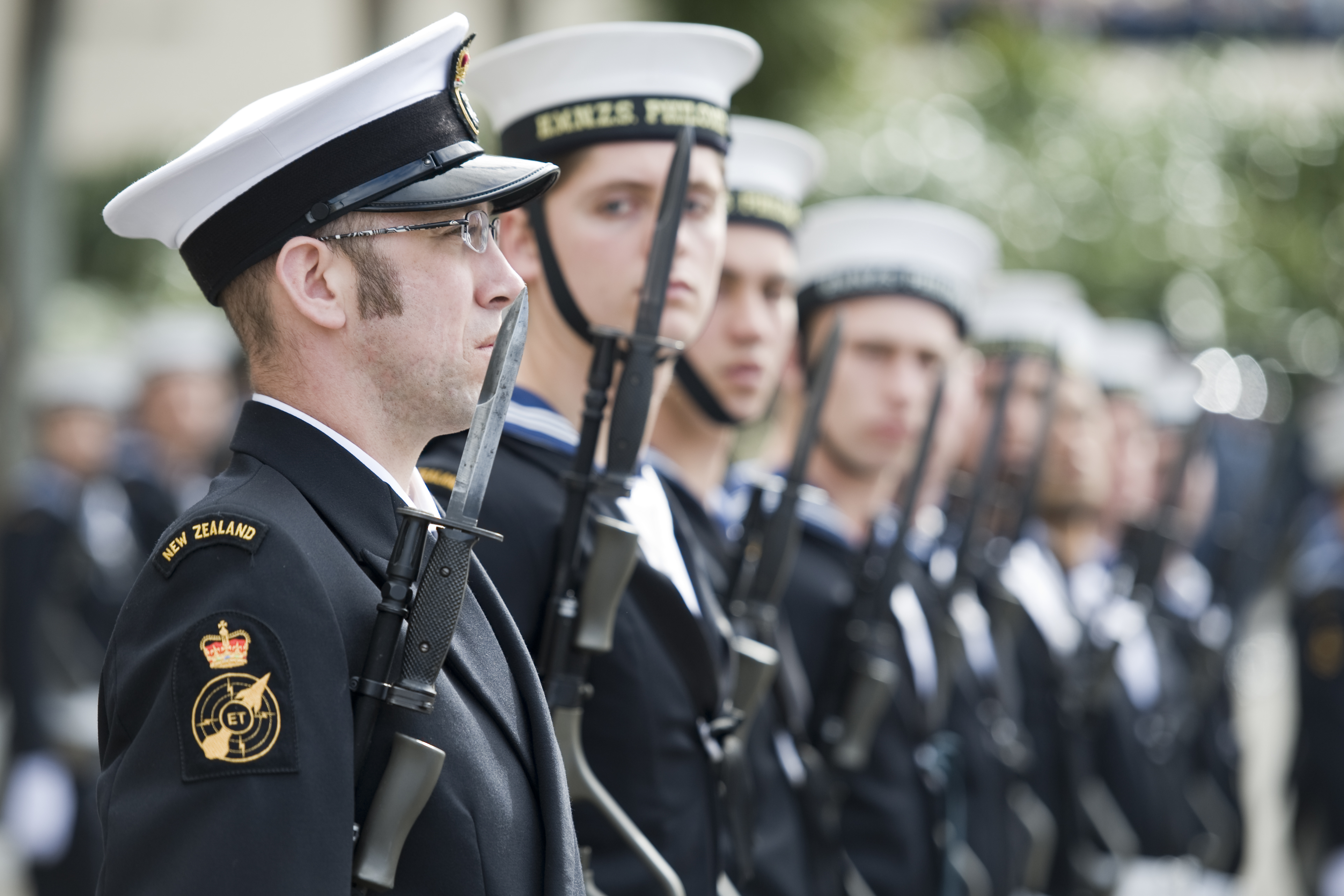
Royal New Zealand Navy Guard of Honour. Note Individual Weapon Steyr with American M7 bayonets.

The Royal 22nd Regiment of Canada unfixing their bayonets.

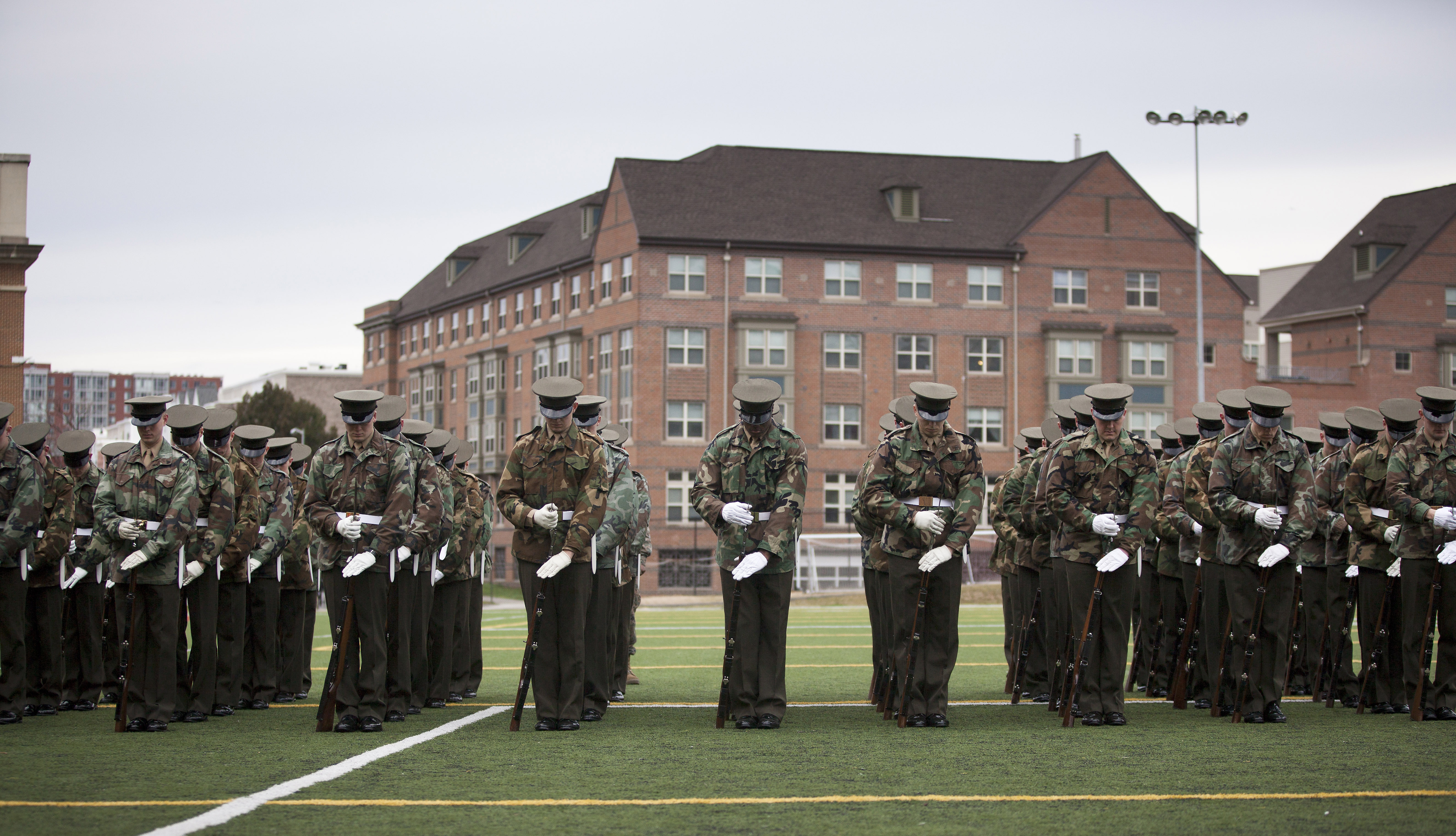
Marines from Marine Barracks Washington D.C. fix their bayonets during rehearsals for the presidential inauguration.

Brazilian LAPA FA-03.
