= Sword bayonet =

Long, knife-bladed bayonet

A sword bayonet is any long, knife-bladed bayonet designed for mounting on a musket or rifle. Its use is thought to have begun in the 18th century and to have reached its height of popularity throughout the 19th and into the early 20th centuries. When unmounted from a musket or rifle, sword bayonets with their typical hilts and long blades also could be wielded as short swords. While modern military bayonets typically have knife blades, they are usually too short to be called sword bayonets and are more akin to fighting/utility knives.

== History ==
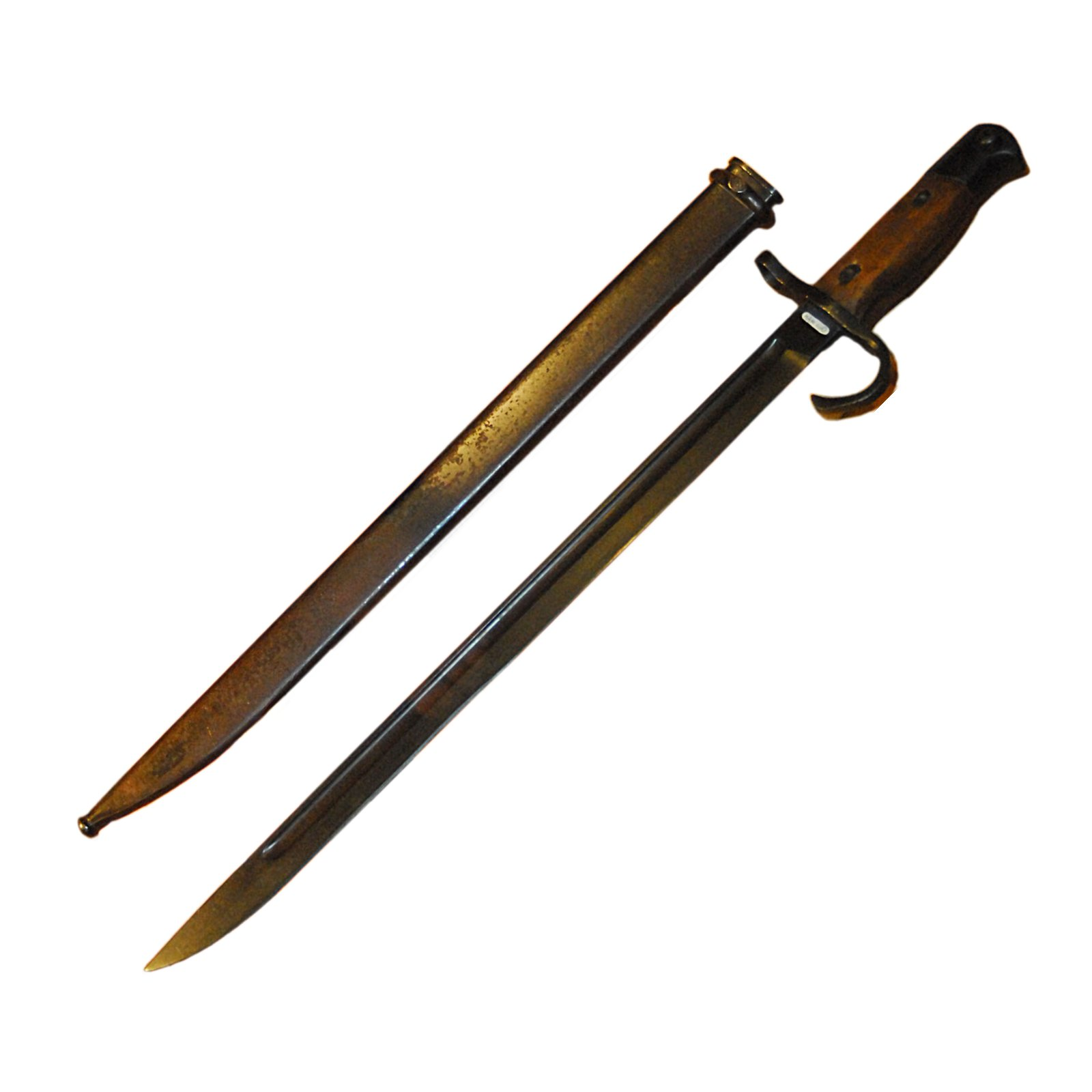
Japanese Type 30 bayonet (made between 1894 and 1945), an example of a straight-edged sword bayonet.

Sword bayonets originated for use with muzzle-loading rifles. A typical example of an early sword bayonet is the 58 centimetre (23 inch) blade variety designed for the Infantry rifle, later called the Baker rifle of the Napoleonic era British Army.

In the modern British "Rifles" regiment, all bayonets are referred to as swords.

Most infantry would routinely keep bayonets fixed to their inaccurate smooth bore muskets throughout a battle. Close order ranks and squares presented a hedge of bayonets to the enemy, which was especially useful for deterring cavalry. But a fixed bayonet - a pound (1 lb (0.45 kg)) or so of extra metal on the front of a firearm - seriously affects a firearm’s balance and hampers accurate shooting. However, Mosin-Nagant rifles using cruciform and dagger bayonets were arsenal zeroed with them affixed (or extended) as they affect point-of-impact via barrel harmonics, and in the case of Imperial Russian and Soviet battle doctrine dictated they were always affixed (with few exceptions). A rifleman usually fought without a fixed bayonet since accuracy was the whole purpose of their rifled weapon. He therefore required a side-arm that could be drawn and used instantly in an emergency so his bayonet had a cutting edge and a grippable hilt. That such bayonets were far heavier than standard socket bayonets was not a disadvantage since they were rarely fixed. Most riflemen found it worked better for cutting brush and roasting meat over a fire (See Rifleman Harris, Costello's, Simmons's diaries).

On occasion riflemen did form up in close order. Since rifles were shorter than muskets their bayonets needed to be longer to produce the same total length; the sword bayonet answered this need.

As well as rifle regiments, other soldiers whose battlefield role did not involve standing shoulder to shoulder in ranks, notably sergeants, also came to use sword bayonets. By the end of the nineteenth century all infantry had become riflemen and the sword bayonet had become the standard infantry bayonet.

Bayonets lost their popularity after World War I. While sword bayonets can be effective as short swords, they proved to be too unwieldy in cramped quarters in trench warfare, although spike bayonets continued to be used throughout most of the 20th century. A shorter version of the sword bayonet, the knife bayonet, was developed. Today, the majority of modern bayonets are knife bayonets.

== Uses ==
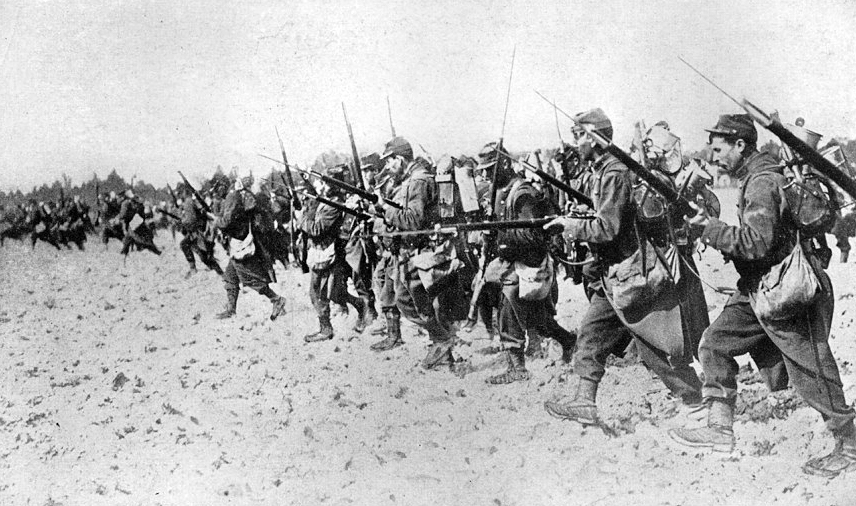
A photograph showing a French bayonet charge taken just before the Great War. Note the long needle-like épée bayonet, for the French Lebel Model 1886 rifle.

With the appearance of the hiltless sword bayonet, such as the socket-mounted variety, their use on the end of the musket or rifle also became a hindrance during the reloading of the muzzle-loaded longarm, (a common problem to all muzzle-loading infantry weapons). A bayonet of similar style and dimension was used on the Lee–Enfield rifle of the early 20th century.

The advantages of sword bayonets over spike bayonets are evident. Where a spike bayonet turns the rifle into a spear, a sword bayonet turns it into a glaive. Unlike spike bayonets, which can be used only for thrusting, sword bayonets can also be used for slashing, except for the épée bayonets. Twisting a sword bayonet in the wound was especially lethal. Before the advent of modern medicine after World War I, a soldier struck by a sword bayonet was very unlikely to survive.

== Variants ==
While most sword bayonets have straight blades, a popular variant in the 19th century featured sinuous, S-curved blades like those found on Ottoman sword called the yatagan. Today, sword bayonets of this style are said to have "yataghan" blades, or to be "yataghan-bladed".
