= LAPA FA-03 =

LAPA FA Modelo 03
- The LAPA FA-03 with a bayonet attached.
- Type: Bullpup assault rifle
- Place of origin: Brazil

Production history
- Designer: Nelmo Suzano
- Designed: 1978-1983
- Manufacturer: LAPA-Laboratorio de Pesquisa de Armamentos Automaticos, SC/Ltda
- Produced: 1978/1983
- No. built: 1 prototype built

Specifications
- Mass: 3.2 kg (7.1 lb) (empty)
- Length: 735 mm (28.9 in)
- Barrel length: 490 mm (19 in)
- Cartridge: 5.56×45mm NATO (5.56×45mm non-NATO standard (55-grains M193 "Ball" cartridge))
- Caliber: 5.56mm
- Barrels: Rifling: 1:12 pitch (1 turn in 305 mm), 6 grooves
- Action: Gas-operated, Rotating bolt
- Rate of fire: 700 rounds/min
- Muzzle velocity: 975 m/s (3,200 ft/s)
- Effective firing range: 550 m (600 yd)
- Feed system: 20- or 30-round detachable box magazine (STANAG 4179)
- Sights: Fixed front sight, adjustable rear sight, patterned after US M16 rifle

The LAPA FA-03 was a bullpup assault rifle designed in Brazil by the company LAPA (Laboratório de Pesquisa de Armamentos Automáticos, SC/Ltda, Automatic Armament Research Laboratory SC/Ltda), and developed by its owner, Nelmo Suzano (1930-2013).

The acronym FA-03 stands for "Fuzil de Assalto Modelo 03" ("Assault Rifle Model 3").

== History ==
The development and production of the prototype rifle took place between 1978 and 1983, with two other models being planned (one 9mm submachine gun and the other a .22) with the aim of having domestic and military weapons for both domestic sale and export. The FA-03 was the only bullpup model made by LAPA and only one prototype was built. The FA-03 was an assault rifle with a fire selector register based on the standard piston operated system with a rotating bolt lock.

Members of the Brazilian armed forces who tested the FA-03, discarded it on the grounds that it looked like a toy (because of the plastic and bullpup design) and because of its low weight. Despite reducing the weapon's weight, the plastic did not affect its control in automatic fire.

Bullpup rifles would become popular in Asia, and Malaysia became interested in the LAPA FA-03. But due to the aforementioned production problems, the Malaysians ended up opting for the Steyr AUG, manufacturing it under license by SME Ordnance.

The LAPA FA-03 never passed the prototype phase and only a single prototype was ever produced.

== Design ==
A feature of the FA-03 was the absence of a safe position. A single lever is set for one of the three firing modes: “30” for full auto, “3” for controlled 3-round burst, “1” for semiautomatic fire; and the two action modes “SA” for single action and “DA” for double action. The rifle was stable in 3-round bursts fired both from the shoulder and from the hip (assault position).

The arrangement of the bullpup rifle made it as compact as possible without shortening the barrel to a point where ballistic efficiency would be degraded. To achieve this, the trigger was moved forward and the firing mechanism, together with the magazine, was fitted into the stock cavity. The eject port could be adjusted ambidextrously, albeit with the ejection being right side only.

=== Ergonomics ===
Brazilian weapons specialist Ronaldo Olive (1942-2021) noted the rifle as being ergonomically pleasant. The rifle's sling can secure it in different places, being noticeably comfortable in long marches. Suzano, the creator, believed that the double action mode worked very well as a safety lock, as to be able to shoot in this position would need a very strong and long pull on the trigger, which would not happen by accident or by fatigue of the mechanism. This also ensured the impossibility of accidental firing when the hammer is released due to some technical problem that the weapon might have.

The LAPA FA-03 rifle had a plastic receiver that protected the weapon mechanism against external agents (water, sand, dust, etc.) and considerably reduced the overall weight of the weapon. Originally the rifle was fed by a plastic magazine, but it was changed to be fed by metallic STANAG magazines to facilitate its export to countries that used other types of magazines.

=== Caliber ===
The LAPA FA-03 was a rifle chambered in 5.56x45mm NATO, American M193 ammunition (55 grains), the barrel pitch was 1:12 (one round in 305mm); with plans for the future Belgian 62-grain FN SS109 standard ammunition, which would later be adopted as a standard by NATO. Production specimens would have barrels adapted for NATO's new SS109 ammunition. Ronaldo Olive thus explained the problems with the ammunition during the tests of the LAPA FA-03:

"A long time ago, Nelmo Suzano, the rifle’s designer, told me that shortly after it had been sent to Brazilian Army’s Marambaia Proving Ground in Rio de Janeiro for the official certification program that would clear it for series production (it was not, in fact, an Army evaluation for possible use) he received reports that three case extraction problems had occurred in about 500 rounds fired. Since he and several other people, including myself, had already fired thousands of rounds through the gun with virtually no problems, he became justly surprised and headed to the test center to get the rifle back and the remaining 5,500 or so rounds left of the 6,000 total of CBC ammunition that had been acquired for the tests. A detailed examination of the gun showed no problems with both internals and externals, so Nelmo turned his attention to the ammo.

The cartridge cases involved in the incidents presented what he called “overpressure bulges”. After examining an measuring each of the unfired rounds, he found out that 64% of them presented size or shape discrepancies that would lead to unacceptable headspace variations when chambered and fired. More so, some rounds were found with the primer mounted backwards (!) and quite a few had the bullet out of alignment with the case. Nelmo then took the defective rounds to the CBC factory and showed them to a top company executive, who could give no satisfactory explanations other than saying the “heads would roll”… In the event, the rifle was not returned to the Marambaia Testing Ground, other associates of the LAPA company gave up their financial participation in the program and Nelmo was left alone. At that time, he had received a request from the Malaysian military who wanted that eight guns be sent immediately for an evaluation program that would lead to the local production of the Brazilian bullpup rifle. He could not have the guns completed at that short notice, so the whole thing did not proceed further. It should be recalled that, later, the Steyr AUG was adopted by Malaysia and produced there under license…"

Ronaldo Olive, LAPA bullpup rifle: the final story.

== In popular culture ==
The LAPA rifle is used by the Brazilians, and by the protagonist in particular, in the French Guiana war in the science fiction book Selva Brasil (2010), by Roberto de Sousa Causo.

Ryan Cawdor in the book series The Deathlands before changing over to a HK G11 used a LAPA in older first series books and in flash backs of moments that happened prior to the original first few books before the switch to the HK G11
