= Spike bayonet =

Type of firearm attachment

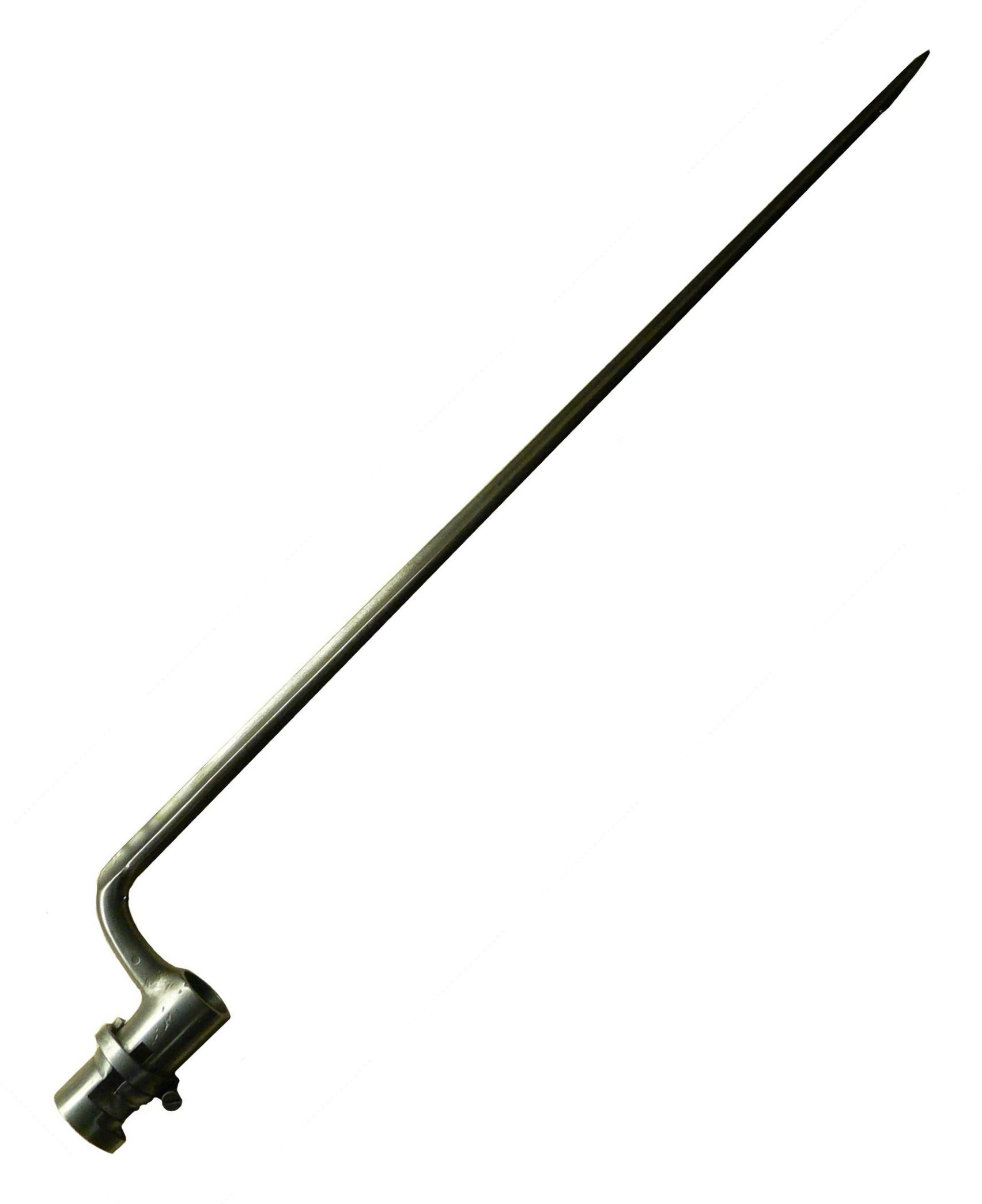
Early 19th century socket bayonet

A spike bayonet, also commonly known as a socket bayonet, or a pigsticker in informal contexts, is a blade attachment for a firearm taking the form of a pointed spike rather than a knife.

== Description ==
Most early musket bayonets were of this type. Beginning in the early 19th century, knife and/or sword bayonets began to appear, which could also be wielded by hand. In the early to mid-20th century, spike bayonets reappeared, often folding or stowed under the barrel for compactness, such as on the French Lebel M1886 and MAS-36, Russian SKS and Mosin-Nagant, German FG 42, and British Lee–Enfield. The Lee-Enfield Rifle No.4 bayonet, took the form of a short spike (but fixed conventionally), and was unpopular due to its length and lack of utility.

Spike bayonets have not been popular with armies since the end of World War II, with the exception of China, which attached them to its AK-47 rifle and SKS carbine variants (Type 56 and Type 63).
