= M1905 bayonet =

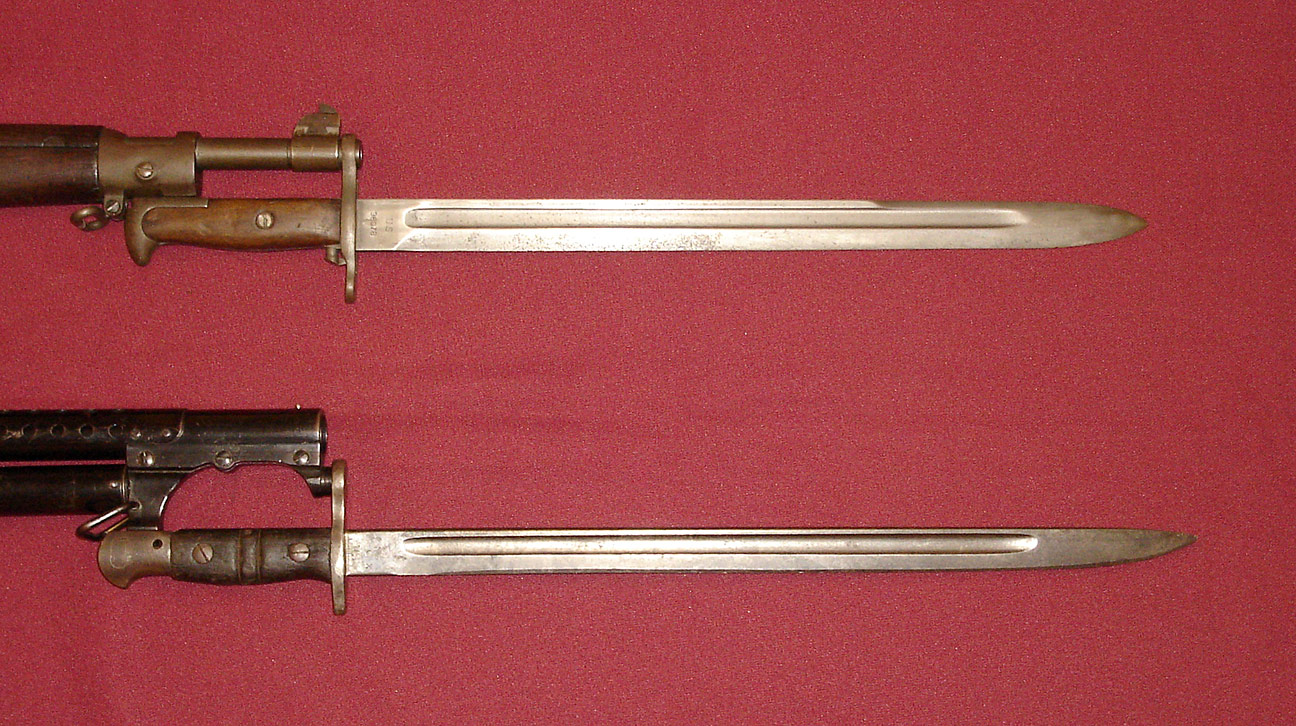
- U.S. military bayonets used in World War I. Shown is a U.S. bayonet M1905 affixed to a 1903 Springfield rifle and a U.S. bayonet M1917 affixed to a (trench-broom) Winchester Model 12 pump-action shotgun.
- Type: Sword bayonet
- Place of origin: United States

Service history
- In service: 1906–present
- Used by: United States; Cuba; Denmark; Greece; Italy; Norway; South Korea; West Germany
- Wars: Mexican Expedition; World War I; Banana Wars; World War II; Greek Civil War; Korean War; Vietnam War

Production history
- Designed: 1906
- Manufacturer: Springfield Armory; Rock Island Arsenal; American Fork & Hoe Co.; Oneida, Ltd.; Pal Blade and Tool Co.; Union Fork & Hoe Co.; Utica Cutlery Co.; Wilde Drop Forge & Tool Co.
- Produced: M1905: 1906–1922, 1942–1943; M1: 1943–1945
- No. built: M1905: Approximately 2,700,000; M1: Approximately 2,700,000
- Variants: M1 bayonet

Specifications
- Length: 20 in (51 cm) for M1905; 14 in (36 cm) for M1
- Blade length: 16 in (41 cm) for M1905; 10 in (25 cm) for M1
- Blade type: Spear point or beak point
- Scabbard/sheath: Model of 1905 scabbard; Model of 1910 scabbard; M3 scabbard; M7 scabbard

The Model of 1905 bayonet was made for the U.S. M1903 Springfield rifle. This designation was changed to Model 1905 in 1917, and then to M1905 in 1925, when the army adopted the M designation nomenclature. The M1905 bayonet has a 16 in (41 cm) steel blade and a 4 in (10 cm) handle with wooden or plastic grips. The bayonet also fits the U.S. M1 Garand rifle. From 1943 to 1945, a shorter, 10 in (25 cm), bladed version was produced with either black or dark red molded plastic grips, and designated the M1 bayonet. A number of M1905 bayonets were recalled from service, their blades cut down, and reissued as M1 bayonets, but the cut down version was not used in Vietnam.

== M1905 bayonet ==
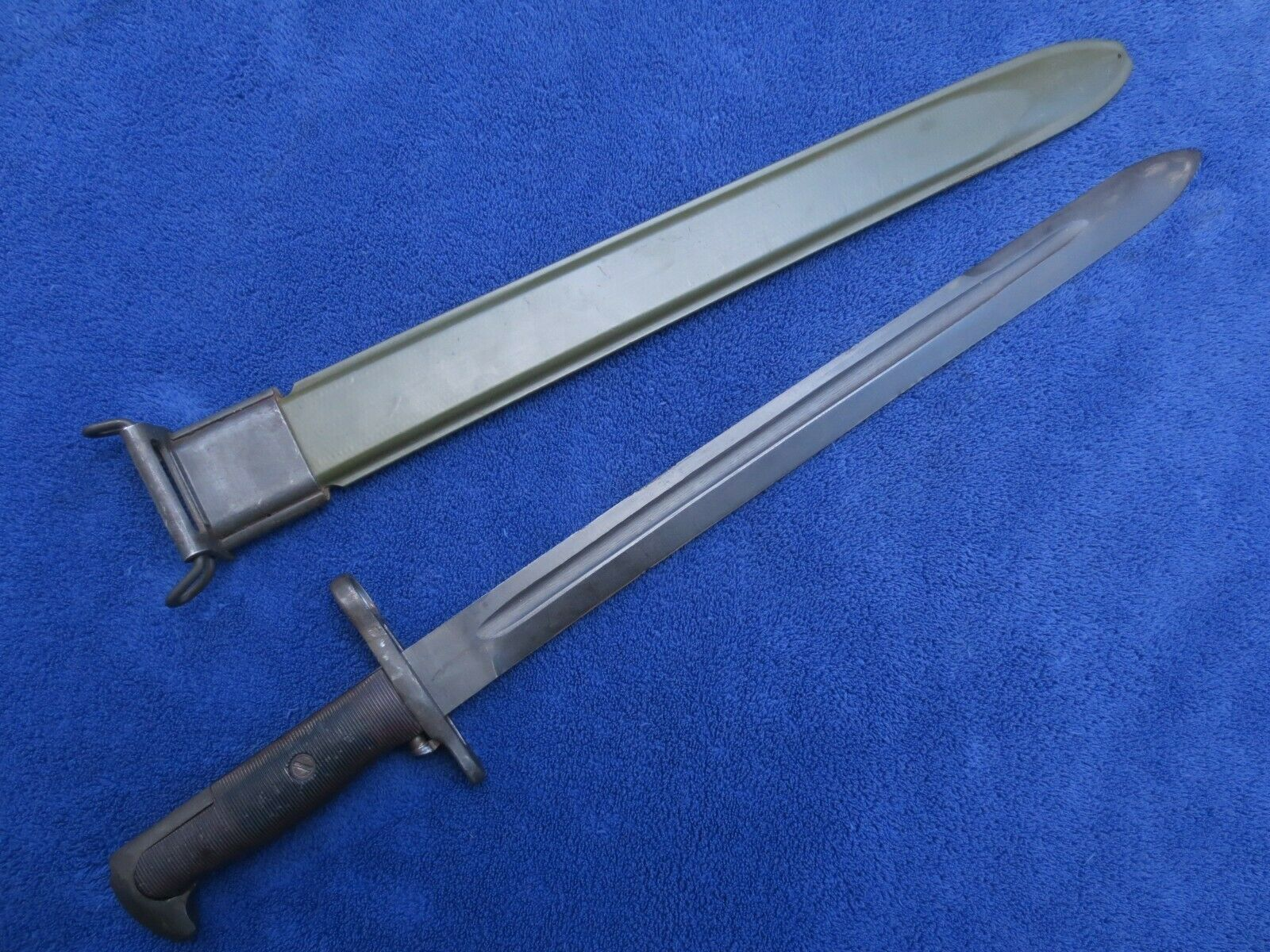
M1905-42 Bayonet and Scabbard by the Wilde Drop Forge & Tool Co.

The M1905 bayonet was produced from 1906 to 1922 by Springfield Armory and Rock Island Arsenal. The blade and handle frame were forged as a single piece with a wide, square-shaped fuller, and the crossguard was pinned to this assembly through two holes with cone-shaped steel pins. The ribbed hand grips were made of walnut wood and attached to the handle with a screw. The screw also held the catch mechanism, manipulated with a button under the crossguard, that was used to fix the bayonet to the rifle's bayonet lug. Also fit early pre-M1941 Johnson rifle model R. In mid-1941, it was decided to restart production of the M1905 bayonet. To simplify production, these later bayonets had handles with black or dark red ribbed grips, made of phenol formaldehyde resin, the earliest type of synthetic plastic. Production was scheduled to begin in January 1942, but the first bayonets were not delivered until April, with quantity deliveries not beginning until the summer of 1942. Despite initial setbacks, the M1905 bayonet was manufactured in sufficient numbers to keep up with the widespread introduction of the new M1 Garand rifle in 1942. By the end of 1942, all six manufacturers had changed the shape of their fullers to a narrower, round-bottomed shape. The later version of the M1905 bayonet with plastic grips is sometimes referred to as the "M1942" by collectors and historians, but this designation was never used by the Army.

== M1 bayonet ==
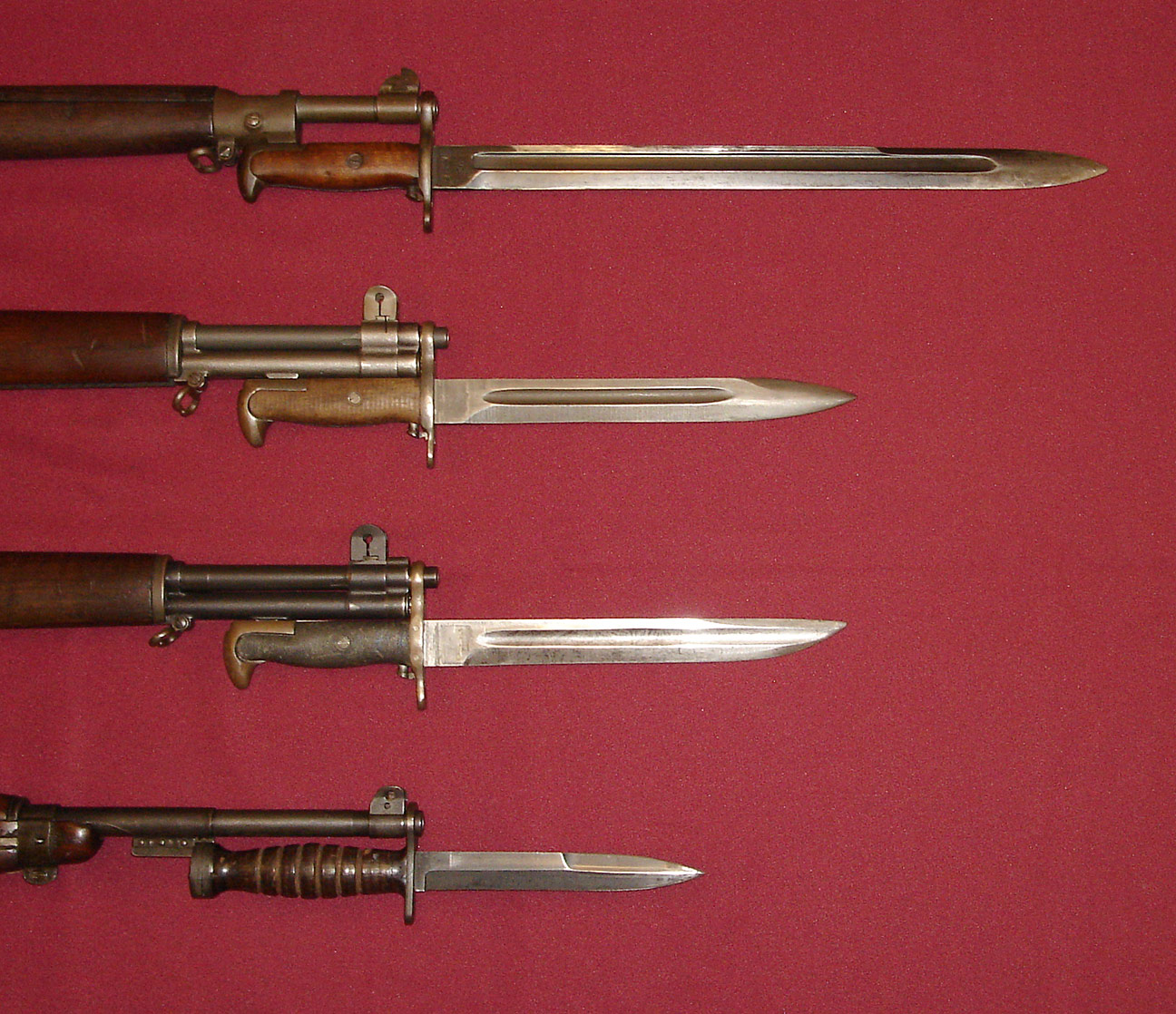
U.S. military bayonets of World War II. Shown are (top to bottom:) the M1905 bayonet (blued version), M1 bayonet, M1 "Bowie point" bayonet (cut down version of the M1905) and the M4 bayonet with leather handle for the M1 carbine

After testing in early 1943, the U.S. Army decided to shorten the M1905 bayonet's blade to 10 in (25 cm). Production of this new bayonet, designated the M1, began at the five remaining manufacturers by April 1943. Because of quality control issues and problems meeting delivery expectations, Wilde Drop Forge and Tool was dropped from the bayonet production program after finishing their run of M1905 bayonets. As many of the M1905 bayonets already in service as possible were recalled, their blades were cut down, and they were reissued; roughly 1 million bayonets underwent this process. The first shortened bayonets were delivered in September 1943, and deliveries continued at a rate of 40,000-50,000 per month until August 1945.

The points were either shortened to a "spear" or "beak" point, the latter being used most often on the early M1905 bayonets with a square fuller to give extra strength to the tip of the blade. Oneida was dropped from the bayonet program altogether in November 1943 after it asked the War Department to be released, as it could not keep its workers steadily employed because of the erratic nature of recalling bayonets for shortening. Utica and Pal Blade and Tool were released from shortening in 1944. American Fork and Hoe and Union Fork and Hoe then took over the duty of shortening M1905 bayonets. These shortened bayonets were re-designated as M1; all ten-inch bladed bayonets, whether new production M1 or cut-down M1905, were officially referred to as M1 bayonets, and the Army made no distinction between the two when issuing them.

These shortened bayonets functioned well in the European theater, where in the rare bayonet actions of the time they were matched up against the 9.75-inch-long (24.8 cm) blade of the German S84/98 III bayonet fitted on the standard issue Karabiner 98k rifle. However, in the Pacific theater, the Japanese used the much longer, 15.75 in (40.0 cm) bladed Type 30 sword bayonet on the already very long Arisaka rifle, which caused many American troops to retain the longer, unmodified M1905 bayonet.

== Production ==
Approximate M1905 production (1906–22) by manufacturer	Number
Springfield Armory and Rock Island Arsenal	1,200,000

Approximate M1905 production (1942–43) by manufacturer	Number
Union Fork and Hoe Co.	385,000
American Fork and Hoe Co.	350,000
Pal Blade and Tool Co.	250,000
Oneida, Ltd.	235,000
Utica Cutlery Co.	225,000
Wilde Drop Forge and Tool Co.	60,000

Approximate M1 production (1943–1945) by manufacturer	Number
Union Fork and Hoe Co.	1,100,000
Utica Cutlery Co.	750,000
Pal Blade and Tool Co.	450,000
American Fork and Hoe Co.	350,000
Oneida, Ltd.	75,000

== Scabbards ==
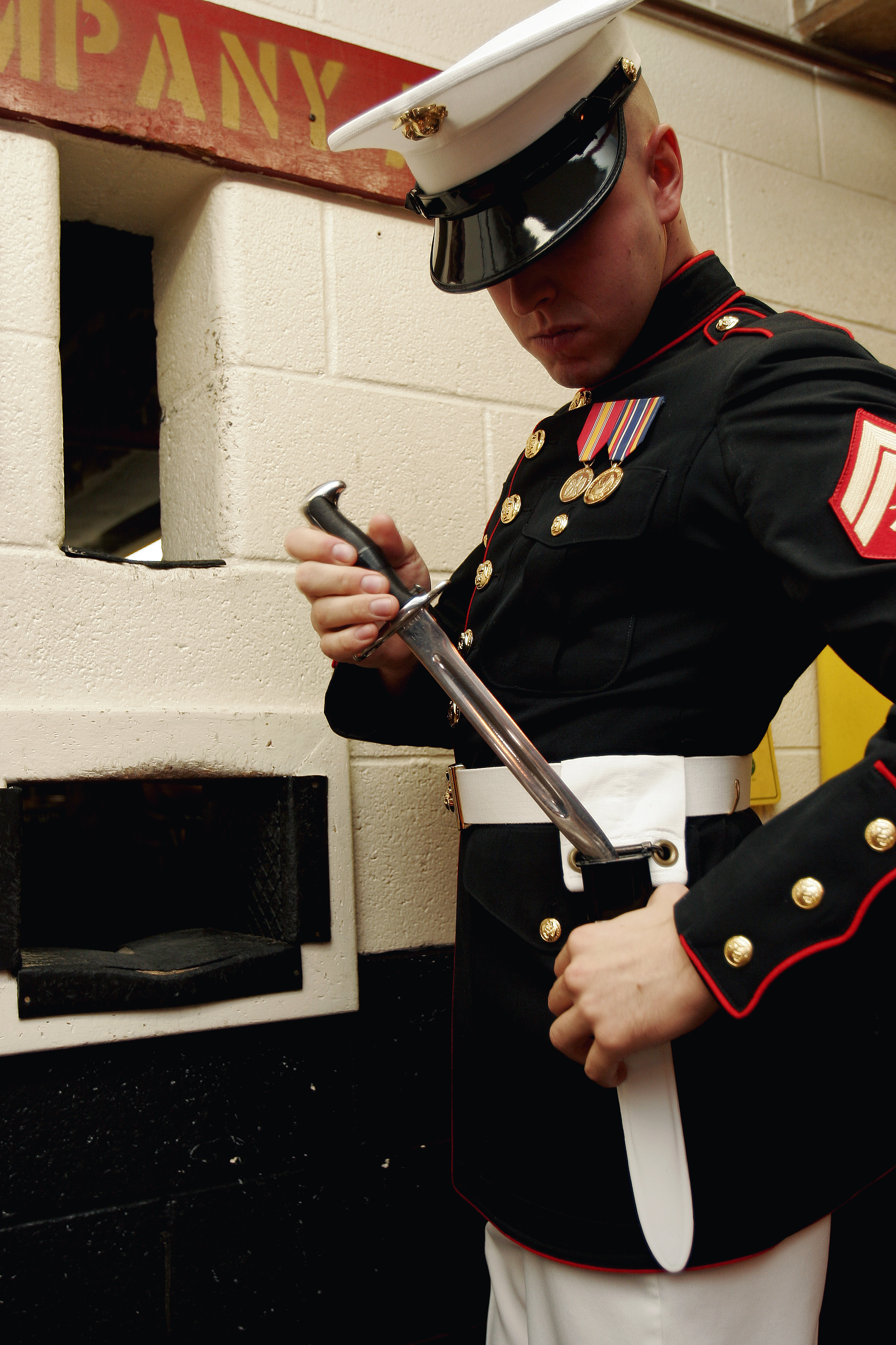
U.S Marine sheaths an M1 bayonet

The original M1905 scabbard had a wooden body with a rawhide cover and employed a wire belt-hanger which went over and around the belt. The M1910 scabbard was covered in canvas with a leather tip to prevent the blade tip from tearing the material. A wire hook that engaged grommets on the cartridge belt replaced the belt-hanger. The M1910 scabbard was the primary scabbard used during the World War I. Earlier M1905 scabbards were modified by replacing the belt-hanger with a belt hook. A green leather-bodied M1917 scabbard (designed for the M1917 bayonet) was approved as a substitute for the M1905 bayonet scabbard.

A new scabbard, the M3, was developed early in the World War II to replace these earlier scabbards. The M3 scabbard had a body made of resin-impregnated cotton duck canvas with a metal throat, and was equipped with a wire hook hanger. The M1905 bayonet had a tendency to rattle inside the scabbard, and so ribs were molded into the scabbard tip to hold the blade. When production of the M1 bayonet began in 1943, a new scabbard, the M7 (otherwise identical in construction to the M3) was developed that used spring steel plates in the scabbard throat to hold the blade instead of the molded ribs. As a part of the bayonet-shortening program, M3 scabbards were also recalled for modification. The tabs which held the body to the throat were bent outward, the body was removed and shortened, and then reinserted into the throat and the tabs bent back. Since the tabs had a tendency to break off when being bent during the shortening process, later shortened scabbards had the tabs removed, short V-shaped cuts were made in the sides of the throat, and it was crimped onto the shortened body using a special tool.

== See also ==
- List of individual weapons of the U.S. Armed Forces
- Sword bayonet
- M3 fighting knife
- M4 bayonet
- M5 bayonet
- M6 bayonet
- M7 bayonet
- M9 bayonet
