= M6 bayonet =

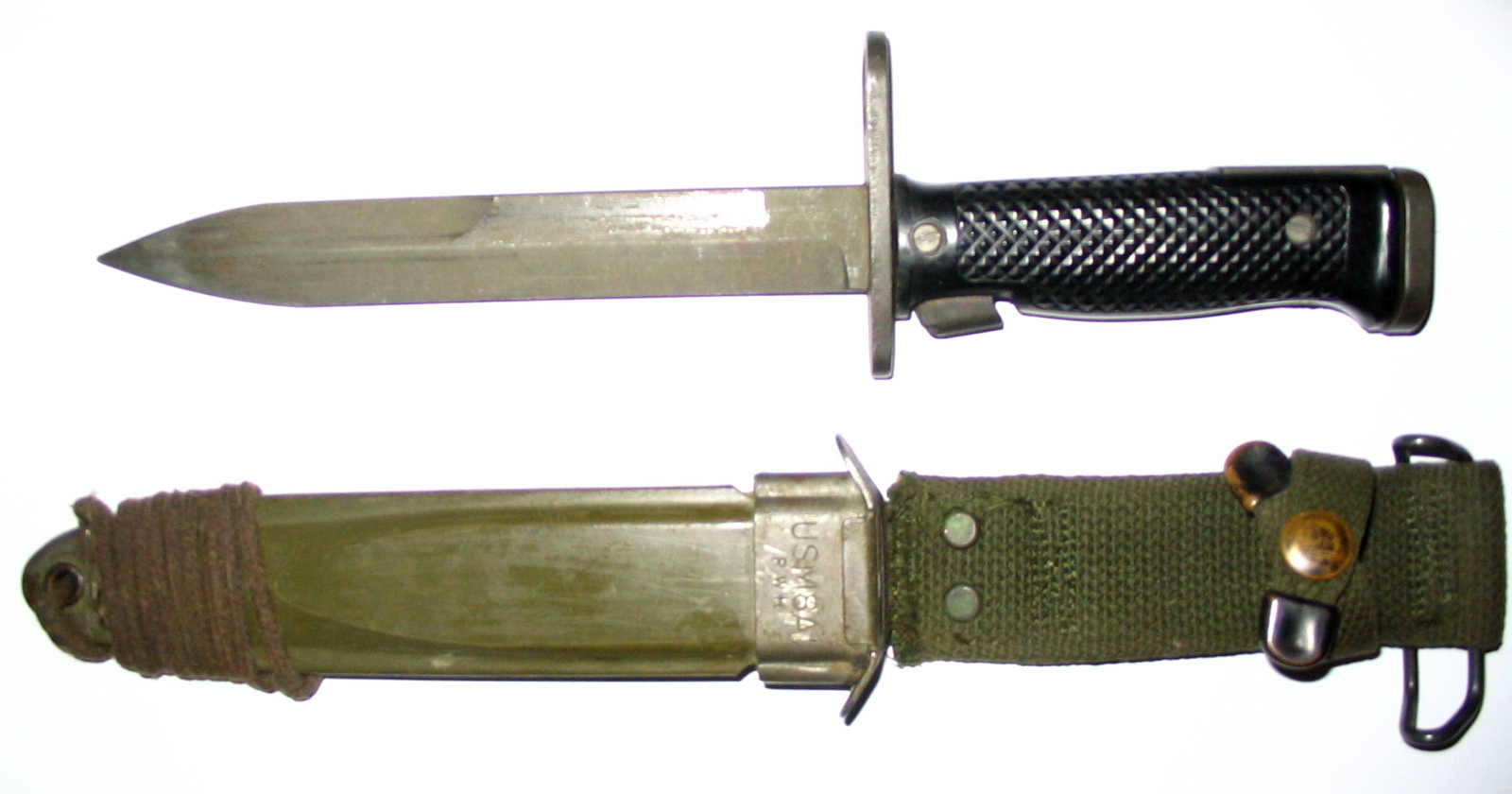
- The M6 bayonet with M8A1 sheath
- Type: Bayonet
- Place of origin: United States

Service history
- In service: 1961–present
- Used by: US Military
- Wars: Vietnam War

Production history
- Designed: 1944 for M4 bayonet
- Manufacturer: Aerial Cutlery Co.; Columbus Milpar and Mfg. Co.; Imperial Knife Co
- Produced: 1961–1969
- Variants: M7 bayonet

Specifications
- Length: 11.75 in (29.8 cm)
- Blade length: 6.75 in (17.1 cm)
- Blade type: Spear Point
- Scabbard/sheath: M8 & M8A1

The M6 bayonet is a bayonet used by the U.S. military for the M14 rifle, it can also be used with the Mk 14 Enhanced Battle Rifle as well M39 Enhanced Marksman Rifle. It was introduced in 1957, at the same time as the rifle itself. It is the only bayonet made for the M14.

== Description ==
Like its predecessor, the M5 bayonet for the M1 Rifle, the M6 was intended to serve additional roles as a combat knife and utility knife.

The basic blade design was like the M4, M5, and later M7 bayonets, based on the World War II designed M3 Trench Knife. The overall length of the M6 is 11.75 in (29.8 cm), with a blade 6.75 in (17.1 cm) long.

Contractors who manufactured the M6 included Aerial Cutlery Co., Columbus Milpar and Mfg. Co. and Imperial Knife Co.The first of these contracts was fulfilled in 1961 and the last in 1969.

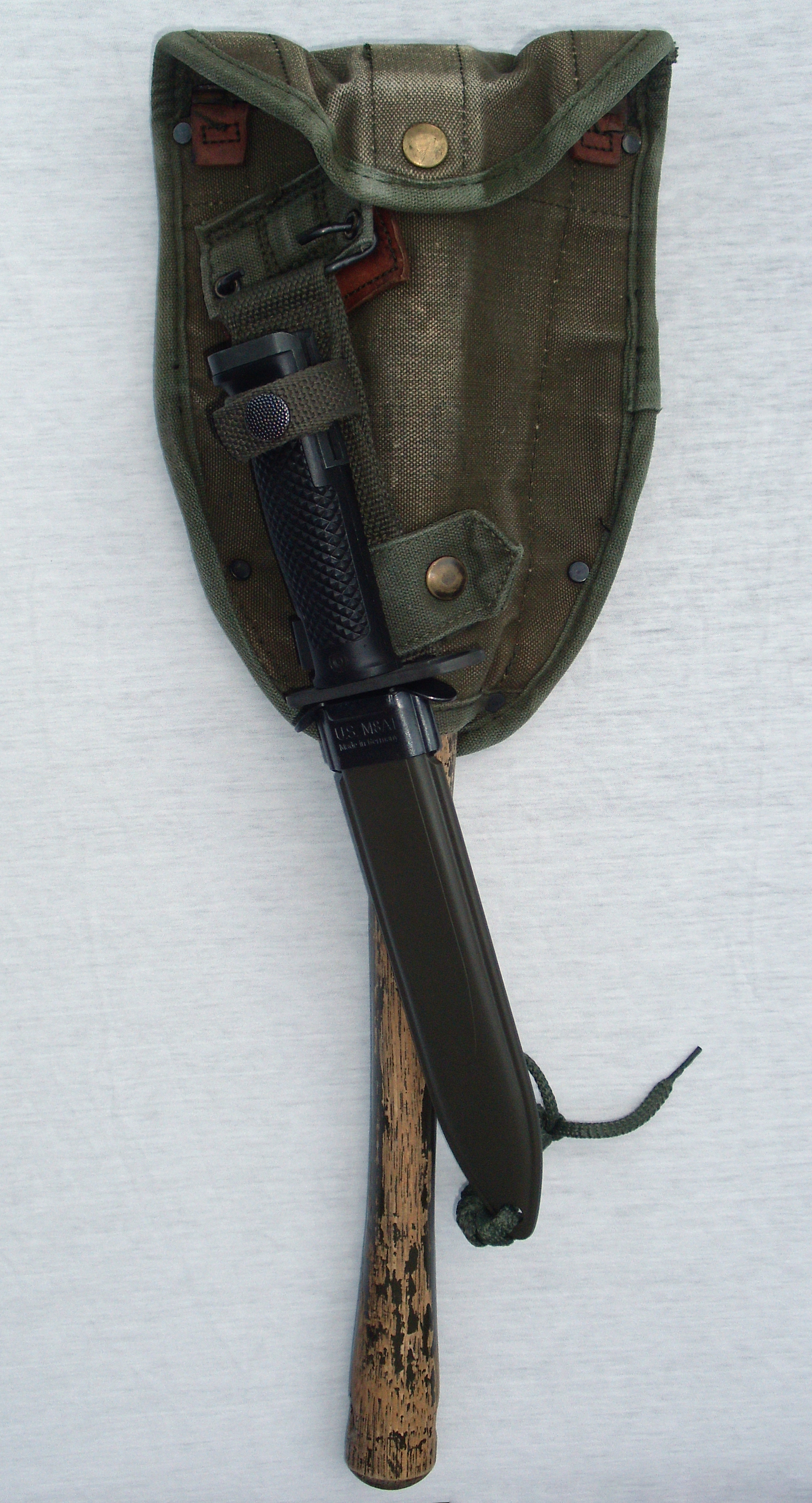
M-1956 entrenching tool carrier with M6 bayonet-knife / M8A1 scabbard attached

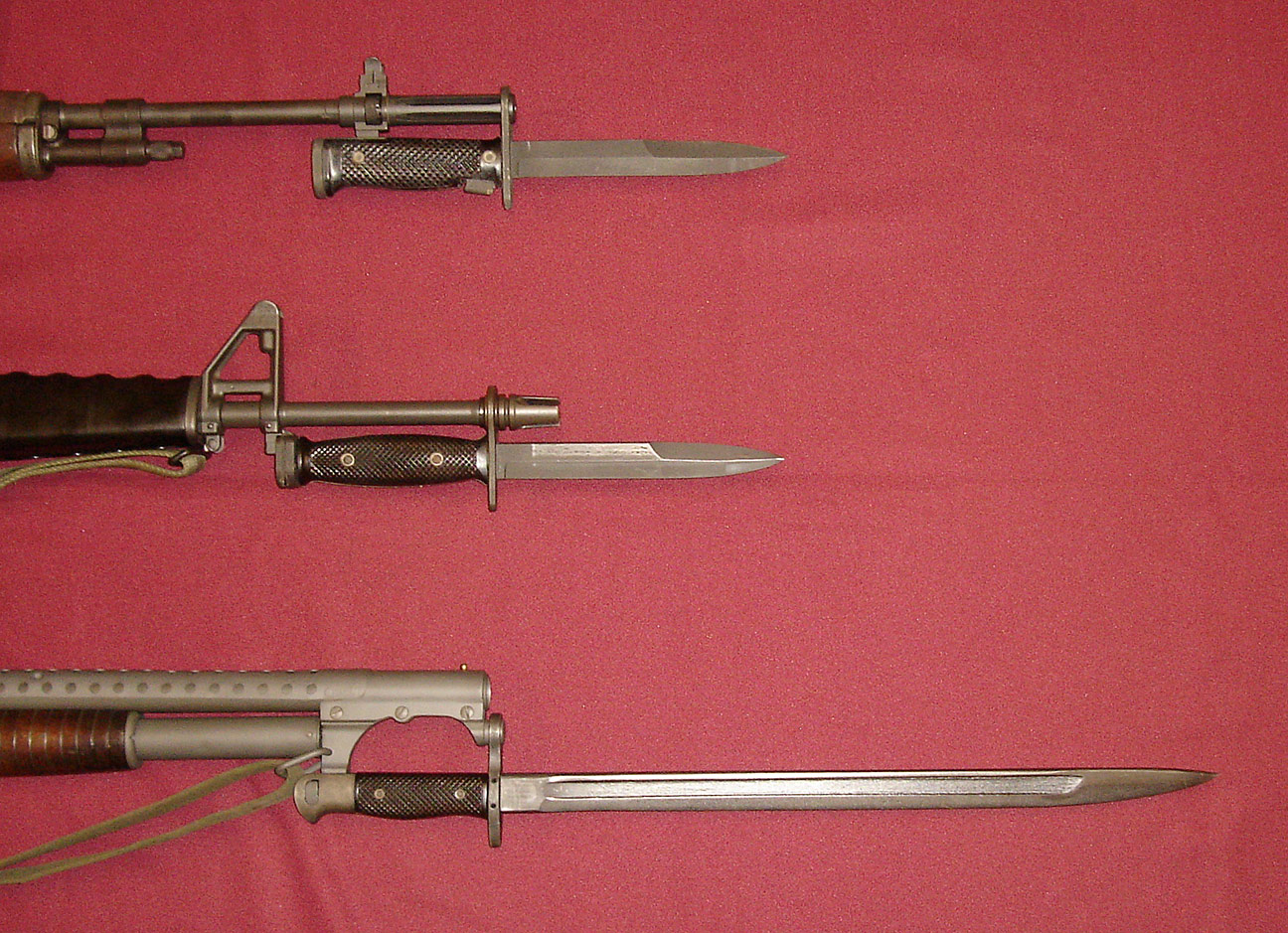
U.S. military bayonets of the Vietnam War. Top: M6 bayonet affixed to the M14 rifle. Center: M7 bayonet affixed to the M16A1 rifle. Bottom: M1917 bayonet affixed to the Winchester model 12 combat shotgun.

1	Screws
2	Left Grip (Plastic)
3	Right Grip (Plastic)
4	Pin for Mount Lock-Release Latch (#5)
5	Mount Lock-Release Latch
6	Spring for Mount Lock-Release Latch (#5)
7	Blade Assembly

=== Scabbards ===
==== M8 Scabbard ====
There are two variations of this scabbard, both with an olive drab fiberglass body with steel throat.

The early version M8 scabbard only had a belt loop and lacked the double hook that earlier bayonet scabbards had for attaching to load carrying equipment such as the M1910 Haversack.

==== M8A1 Scabbard ====
The improved M8A1 scabbard manufactured later in WW II has the M1910 bent wire hook. The scabbard throat flange is stamped "US M8" or "US M8A1" on the flat steel part along with manufacturer initials. Some M8 scabbards were later modified by adding the M1910 hook. Later M8A1 scabbards were manufactured with a modified extended tab on the web hanger to provide more clearance for the M5 bayonet which rubbed against the wider bayonet handle. This sheath is correct for all post-war US bayonets including the M4, M5, M6, and M7. It was also used with the M3 fighting knife.

== Adoption ==
The M7 bayonet which succeeded the M6 bayonet was introduced in 1964 for the M16 rifle. The most notable differences between the two are the diameter of the muzzle rings, the shape of the handle, and the locking mechanism.

The M6 has a spring-loaded lever near the guard which when depressed releases the bayonet, and the M7's release mechanism is on the pommel. Both models are the same length, have the same black finish, and use the M8A1 sheath.

Today, the M6 is mainly used for ceremonial purposes, particularly by the Army and Marine Corps, both of which still use the M14 rifle for exhibition drill.

== See also ==
- M1 bayonet used by the M1 Garand
- M3 fighting knife
- M4 bayonet used by the M1 carbine
- M5 bayonet used by the M1 Garand
- M6 bayonet used by the M14 rifle
- M7 bayonet used by the M16 rifle
- M9 bayonet used by the M16 rifle
- List of individual weapons of the U.S. Armed Forces
