= M5 bayonet =

M5 Bayonet
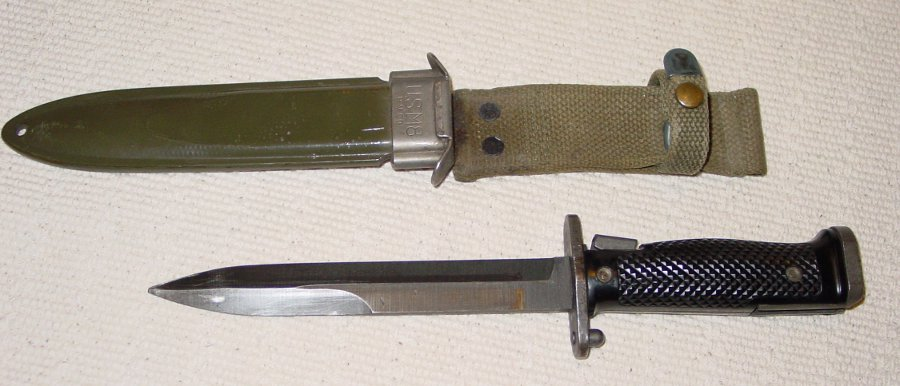
- U.S. military M5 Bayonet with M8 scabbard
- Type: Bayonet
- Place of origin: United States

Service history
- In service: 1953–1970s
- Used by: US Army
- Wars: Korean War; Vietnam War

Production history
- Designed: 1950–1952
- Manufacturer: Aerial Cutlery; Jones & Dickinson Tool; Imperial Knife; Utica Cutlery; Columbus Milpar & Mfg
- Produced: 1953–1977

Specifications
- Length: 11.5 in (29 cm)
- Blade length: 6.5 in (17 cm)
- Blade type: Spear Point

The M5 Bayonet was adopted by the U.S. military in 1953 to replace other bayonets for the M1 Garand rifle. It uses the M8A1 scabbard.

== Background ==
During the Korean War, the M1 bayonet, which mounted to the M1 rifle, was found difficult to remove while wearing heavy gloves. As a result, the M5 bayonet was designed and issued in 1953.

This was a total redesign based on the M4 bayonet used by the M1 carbine.

The M5 bayonet looks nothing like the original M1 bayonet, and is the only U.S. bayonet without a barrel mount ring on the crossguard, making it look more like a fighting knife than a bayonet.

== Description ==
The M5 bayonet has a 6.75 in (17.1 cm) blade, and overall length is 11.5 in (29 cm). Weight is 11.5 oz (330 g). The blade has one side sharpened for its full length and three inches of the other side are sharpened. There is a relatively large push button release to deal with removal while wearing gloves.

The stud on the bayonet crossguard fits the gas cylinder lock screw under the M1 Rifle barrel. Locking grooves attach to the bayonet lug on the rifle. The M5 fits only the M1 and does not interchange with any other firearms.

There were three different patterns made: M5, M5-1, and M5A1.

M5 Bayonet crossguard labeled US M5

The grips are checkered black molded plastic and all metal parts are a dark gray parkerized finish. There are no markings on the blade. The manufacturer name or initials and "US M5" (or other model) will be found stamped under the cross guard.

Many M5 family bayonets were made in Korea after the Korean War and these will have "K" stamped in place of the "US".

Manufacturers included Aerial Cutlery, Jones & Dickinson Tool, Imperial Knife, Utica Cutlery, and Columbus Milpar & Mfg.

The M5A1 was manufactured during the 1960s and was the last bayonet made for the M1 Garand.

=== Scabbards ===
==== M8 Scabbard ====
There are two variations of this scabbard, both with an olive drab fiberglass body with steel throat. The early version M8 scabbard only had a belt loop and lacked the double hook that earlier bayonet scabbards had for attaching to load carrying equipment such as the M1910 Haversack.

==== M8A1 Scabbard ====
The improved M8A1 scabbard manufactured later in WW II has the M1910 bent wire hook. The scabbard throat flange is stamped "US M8" or "US M8A1" on the flat steel part along with manufacturer initials. Some M8 scabbards were later modified by adding the M1910 hook. Later M8A1 scabbards were manufactured with a modified extended tab on the web hanger to provide more clearance for the M5 bayonet which rubbed against the wider bayonet handle. This sheath is correct for all post-war US bayonets including the M4, M5, M6, and M7. It was also used with the M3 fighting knife.

== See also ==
- M3 fighting knife
- M4 bayonet used by the M1 carbine
- M6 bayonet used by the M14 rifle
- M7 bayonet used by the M16 rifle
