= M4 bayonet =

M4 Bayonet
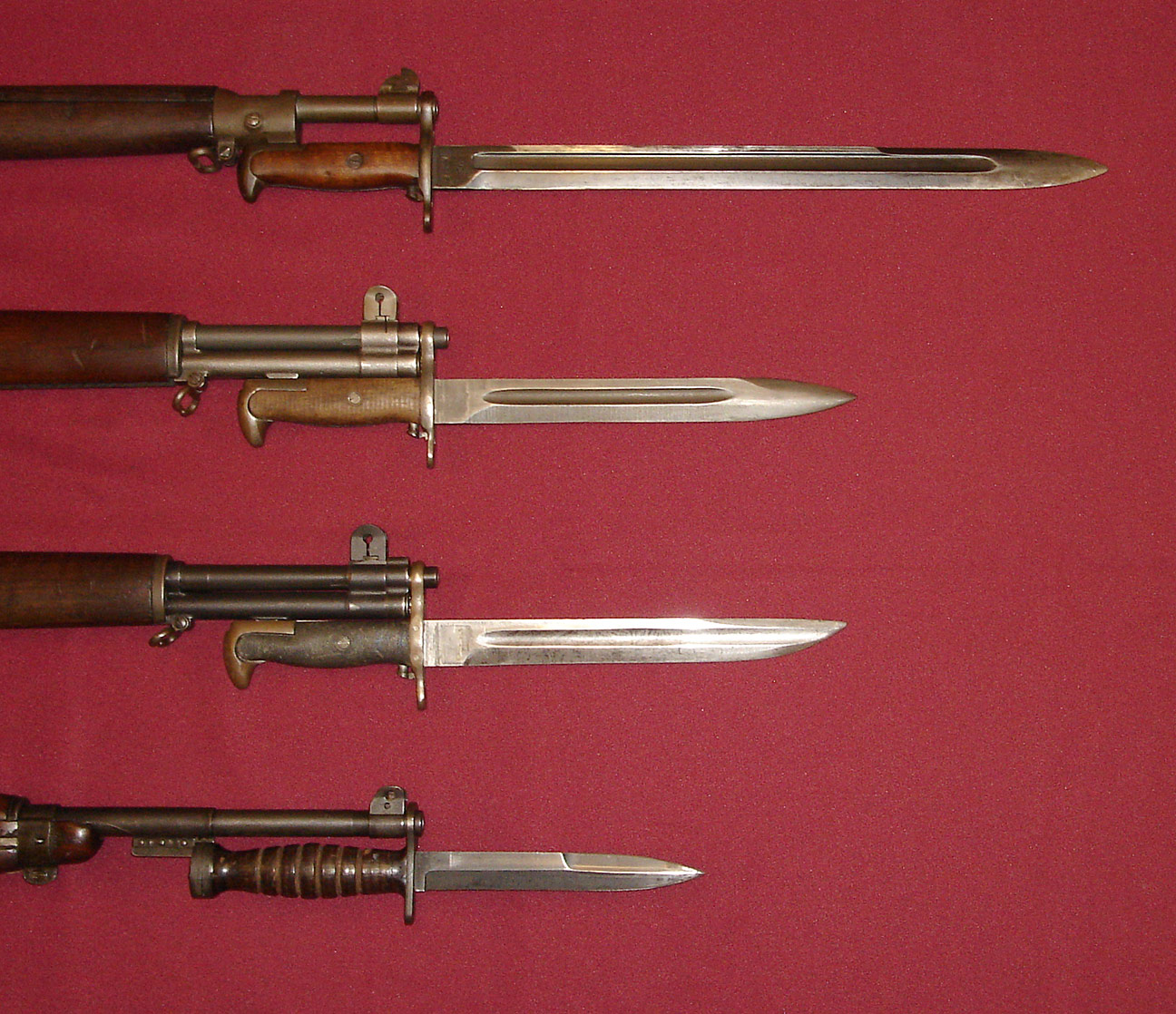
- U.S. military bayonets of World War II. Shown are the M1905 Bayonet (blued version), M1 Bayonet, M1905E1 Wedge Point Bayonet (cut down version of the M1905) and the M4 Bayonet with leather handle for the M1 Carbine (bottom).
- Type: Bayonet
- Place of origin: United States

Service history
- In service: 1944–1970s
- Used by: US Military
- Wars: World War II; Korean War; Vietnam War

Production history
- Designed: 1944
- Manufacturer: Leather handle 1944-1945: Aerial Cutlery Manufacturing Co.; Camillus Cutlery Co.; W.R. Case & Sons Cutlery Co.; Imperial Knife Co.; Kinfolks Inc.; Pal Blade and Tool Co.; Utica Cutlery Co.; Plastic handle 1954–late 1960s: Turner Manufacturing Co.; Imperial Knife Co.; Conetta Manufacturing Co.; Bren-Dan Manufacturing Co.
- Produced: 1944–late 1960s
- Variants: M5 bayonet for M1 Garand; M6 bayonet for M14 rifle; M7 bayonet for M16 rifle

Specifications
- Length: 11.75 in (29.8 cm)
- Blade length: 6.75 in (17.1 cm)
- Blade type: Spear Point
- Scabbard/sheath: M8 & M8A1

The M4 bayonet was introduced in 1944 for use with the M1 carbine. It was built on the M3 fighting knife.

== Description ==
The M4 bayonet, like the M3 fighting knife that preceded it, was designed for rapid production using a minimum of strategic metals and machine processes, it used a relatively narrow 6.75 in (17.1 cm) bayonet-style spear-point blade with a sharpened 3.5 in (8.9 cm) secondary edge.

The blade was made of carbon steel, and was either blued or parkerized.

Production of the grooved wooden handle was later simplified by forming the grip of stacked leather washers that were shaped by turning on a lathe, then polished and lacquered.

The steel crossguard had a bayonet muzzle ring and the bayonet fastener is on the pommel. Later models used a black molded plastic handle.

The basic design would be used for the later M5, M6, and M7 bayonets.

=== Scabbards ===
==== M8 Scabbard ====
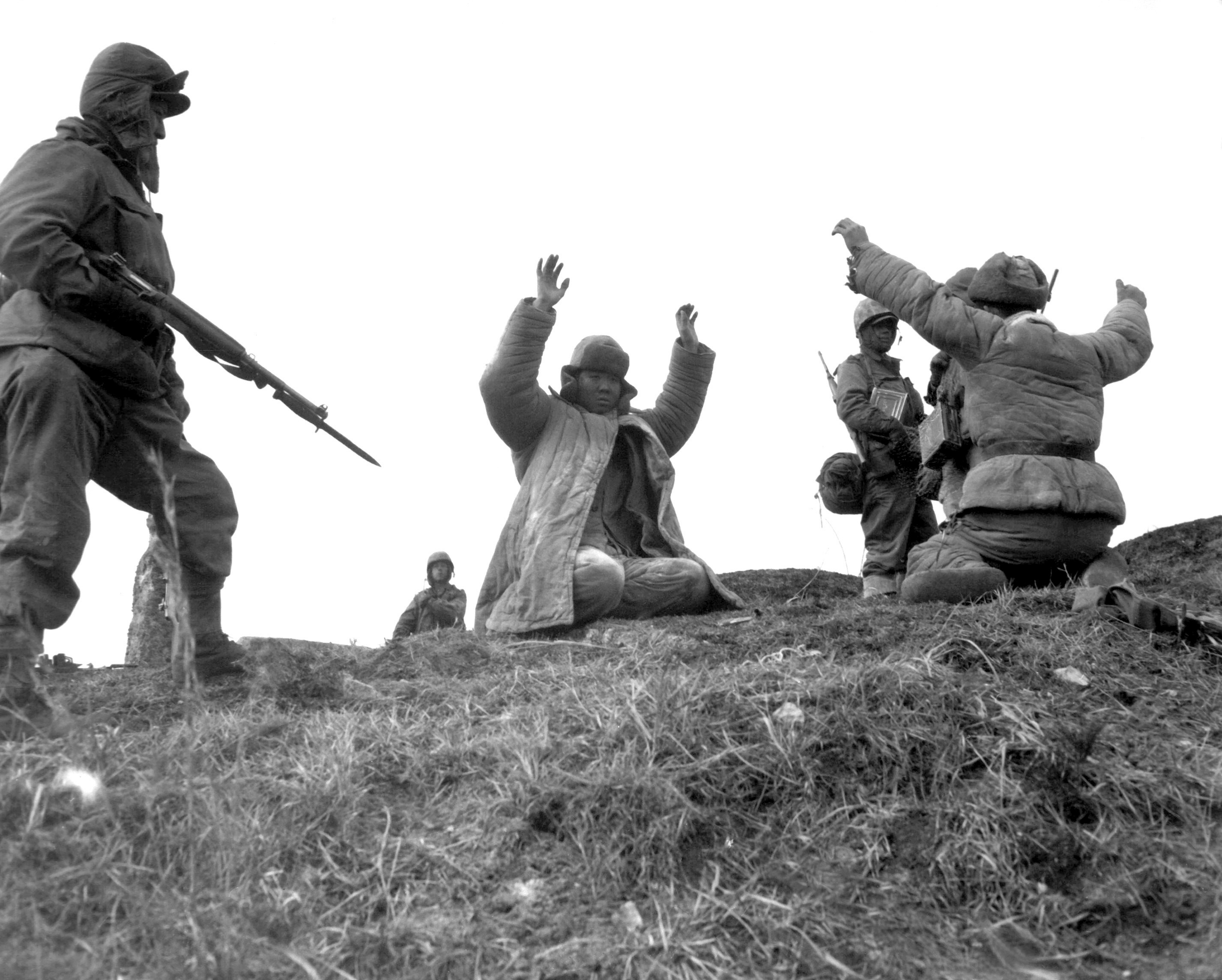
U.S. soldiers guarding Chinese POW's during the Korean War. Note: M2 carbine with attached M4 bayonet

There are two variations of this scabbard, both with an olive drab fiberglass body with steel throat. The early version M8 scabbard only had a belt loop and lacked the double hook that earlier bayonet scabbards had for attaching to load carrying equipment such as the M1910 Haversack.

==== M8A1 Scabbard ====
The improved M8A1 scabbard manufactured later in WW II has the M1910 bent wire hook. The scabbard throat flange is stamped "US M8" or "US M8A1" on the flat steel part along with manufacturer initials. Some M8 scabbards were later modified by adding the M1910 hook. Later M8A1 scabbards were manufactured with a modified extended tab on the web hanger to provide more clearance for the M5 bayonet which rubbed against the wider bayonet handle. This sheath is correct for all post-war US bayonets including the M4, M5, M6, and M7. It was also used with the M3 fighting knife.

== See also ==
- M3 fighting knife
- M5 bayonet used by the M1 Garand
- M6 bayonet used by the M14 rifle
- M7 bayonet used by the M16 rifle
- M9 bayonet
