= M3 trench knife =

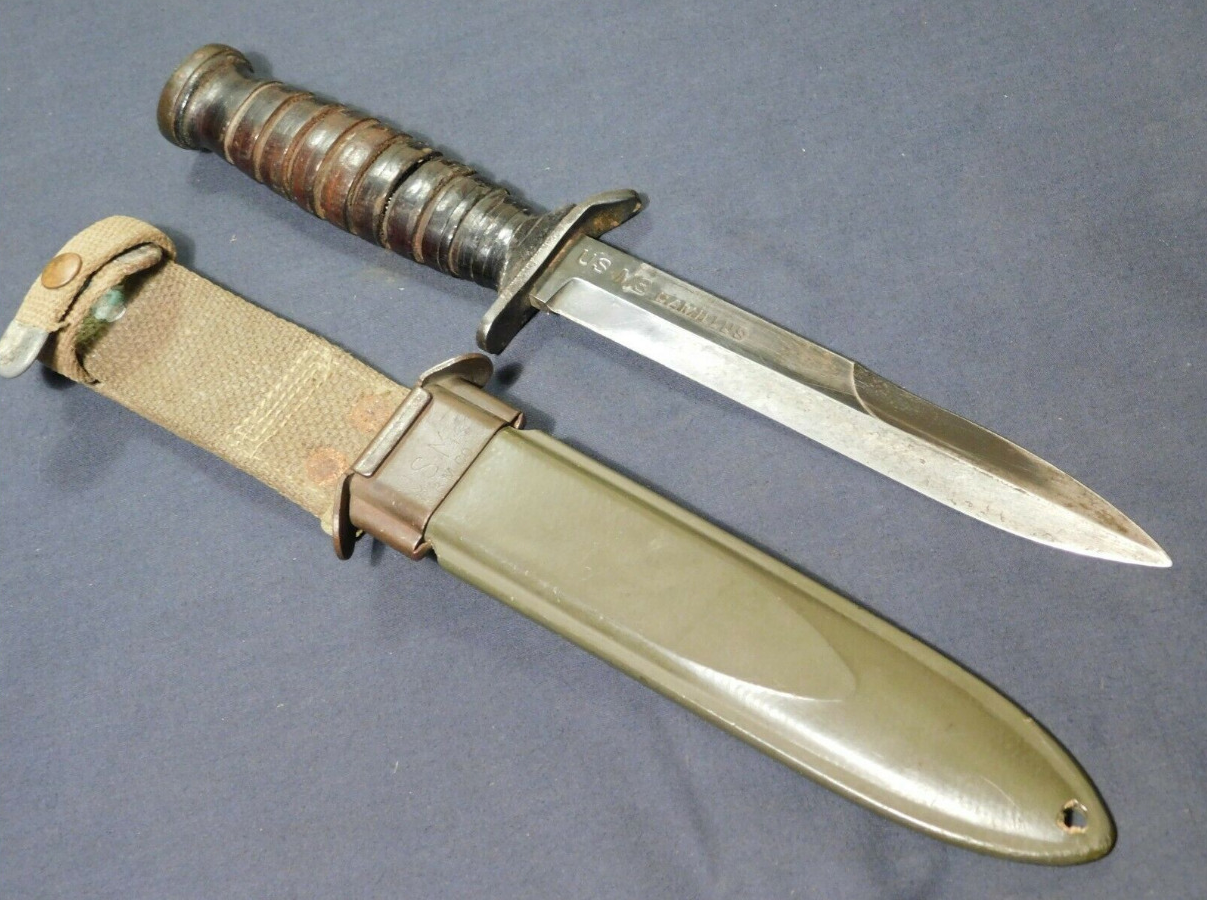
- Original example produced by the Camillus Cutlery Co.
- Type: Fighting knife
- Place of origin: United States

Service history
- In service: 1943–1945
- Wars: World War II; Indochina War; Korean War; Algerian War; Vietnam War; Iran–Iraq War

Production history
- Designed: 1943
- Manufacturer: Aerial Cutlery Co.; W.R. Case & Sons Co.; Imperial Knife Co.; Pal Blade and Tool Co.; Camillus Cutlery Co.; Robeson Cutlery Co.; Kinfolks, Inc.; Utica Cutlery Co.; H. Boker & Sons Co.
- Produced: March 1943-August 1944
- No. built: 2,590,247
- Variants: M4 bayonet for M1 carbine; M5 bayonet for M1 Garand; M6 bayonet for M14 rifle; M7 bayonet for M16 rifle

Specifications
- Length: 11.75 in (29.8 cm)
- Blade length: 6.75 in (17.1 cm)
- Blade type: Spear point
- Scabbard/sheath: M6, M8, & M8A1

The M3 trench knife or M3 fighting knife was an American military combat knife first issued in March 1943.

== Design ==
Designed for rapid production using a minimum amount of strategic metals and machine processes to maximize efficiency, the M3 trench knife used a relatively narrow 6.75 in (17.1 cm) bayonet-style spear-point blade with a sharpened 3.5 in (8.9 cm) secondary edge.

The M3 blade was made of carbon steel, and was either blued or parkerized.

Production of the grooved leather handle was later simplified by forming the grip of stacked leather washers that were shaped by turning on a lathe, then polished and lacquered.

The M3's steel crossguard had an angular bend at one end to facilitate a thumb rest.

=== Scabbards ===
The M3 was initially issued with a stitched and riveted leather M6 scabbard with a protective steel tip designed to prevent the point from piercing the sheath and injuring the wearer.

A rawhide thong on the end of the sheath allowed the user to tie the sheathed knife to his leg to prevent it from flapping when running.

U.S. paratroopers frequently wore an M3 and sheath tied to a boot for emergency use in cutting parachute lines or close-quarters defense. The M6 was quickly dropped in favor of the M8 scabbard.

The M8 and the later M8A1 scabbards both have a resin-impregnated cotton canvas body, painted olive drab, with a steel throat.

The early M8 scabbard only had a belt loop to fit over a pistol or trouser belt, and lacked the wire hook that earlier bayonet scabbards had for attaching to the M1910 series of load carrying equipment.

The improved M8A1 scabbard manufactured later in WWII added the wire hook. Some M8 scabbards were later modified by adding the hook. The scabbard throat is stamped "US M8" or "US M8A1" on the flat steel part along with the manufacturer's initials.

Later M8A1 scabbards were manufactured with a modified extended tab on the web hanger to provide more clearance for the M5 bayonet which rubbed against the wider bayonet handle.

This sheath is also correct for all post-war U.S. bayonets including the M4, M5, M6, and M7.

== Production ==
Approximate M3 production (1943–44) by manufacturer	Number
Imperial Knife Co.	854,015
Utica Cutlery Co.	656,520
Camillus Cutlery Co.	402,909
W.R. Case & Sons Co.	300,465
Kinfolks, Inc.	135,548
Pal Blade and Tool Co.	121,131
Aerial Cutlery Co.	51,784
Robeson Cutlery Co.	36,575
H. Boker & Sons Co.	31,300

== History ==
The M3 was developed as a replacement for the World War I-era U.S. Mark I trench knife, primarily to conserve strategic metal resources.

The prototype for what became the M3 was evaluated in December 1942 by the civilian board of directors of the Smaller War Plants Corporation Board (SWPC) against another competing design, the US Marine Corps' KA-BAR fighting utility knife.

While specified priority steel supplies for both knives were available, the M3's lower production cost compared with that of the KA-BAR convinced the SWPC board of directors to approve the M3 prototype for quantity production.

Although the M3 had competed with the USMC KA-BAR for approval by the Army, the M3, unlike the Marine Corps knife, was not a dual-purpose weapon designed both for close combat (fighting knife) and general use (utility knife). As the U.S. Catalog of Standard Ordnance Items of 1943 clearly explained:

The Trench Knife M3 has been developed to fill the need in modern warfare for hand-to-hand fighting. While designated for issue to soldiers not armed with the bayonet, it was especially designed for such shock units as parachute troops and rangers.

=== Distribution ===
The M3 trench knife was developed as a replacement for the World War I-era U.S. Mark I trench knife, primarily to conserve strategic metal resources.

The M3 was originally designated for issue to soldiers, not otherwise equipped with a bayonet. However, it was particularly designed for use by forces in need of a close combat knife, such as Airborne Units and Army Rangers, so these units received priority for the M3 at the start of production.

The M3 was first issued to U.S. Army soldiers in March 1943, with the first knives going to elite units such as airborne troops and the U.S. Army Rangers.

As more M3 knives became available in 1943 and 1944, the knife was issued to other soldiers such as Army Air Corps crewmen and soldiers not otherwise equipped with a bayonet, including soldiers issued the M1 carbine or a submachine gun such as the Thompson or M3 submachine gun "grease gun".

The M3 would also replace the Fairbairn–Sykes fighting knife or OSS dagger in U.S. service in 1944.

=== Replacement ===
After the Ordnance Department began developing a proprietary bayonet for use on the M1 carbine, it was realized that the new carbine bayonet, which already incorporated the M3 blade design and leather-wrap grip, could also replace the M3 in service in a secondary role as a fighting knife.

In August 1944, the M3 fighting knife evolved into the M4 bayonet for the M1 carbine with the addition of a bayonet ring to the hilt and a locking mechanism in the pommel.

The carbine bayonet, now designated the Bayonet, U.S. M4, was added to the Company Table of Organization in June 1944, and the M3 was declared to be a limited standard ordnance item, with supplies to be issued until exhausted. The final M3 production run did not take place until August 1944, by which time 2,590,247 M3 trench knives had been produced.

At termination of production in August 1944, the M3 trench knife had one of the shortest production and service records of any U.S. combat knife. The M3's blade design continued in U.S. military service in the form of the U.S. M4, M5, M6, and M7 bayonets.

== Reception ==
Despite Ordnance descriptions of the knife as being designed for hand-to-hand warfare, the M3 did not receive universal praise as a close-quarters fighting knife upon issue to combat units.

While the knife itself was generally well-made and balanced (some paratroopers and rangers mastered the art of using the M3 as a throwing knife), the long, narrow, dagger-like steel blade, designed to economize on priority steel requirements, was best used as a thrusting or stabbing weapon, and performed less well when used for cutting or slashing strokes.

Reports of blade failures on M3s in service increased as soldiers began to use their trench knives for ordinary utility tasks such as opening ammunition crates and food ration tins, a role for which the M3 had not been designed. Some soldiers also found the M3's cutting edge to be difficult to maintain in the field.

As issued, the blade's secondary or false edge was intentionally sharpened and beveled for only a portion of its length, leaving an unsharpened spine on the top of the blade in an effort to stiffen the relatively narrow blade. This limited the usefulness of the M3 when employed for backhand slashing strokes.

== See also ==
- List of U.S. Army weapons by supply catalog designation
