= M7 bayonet =

M7 Bayonet
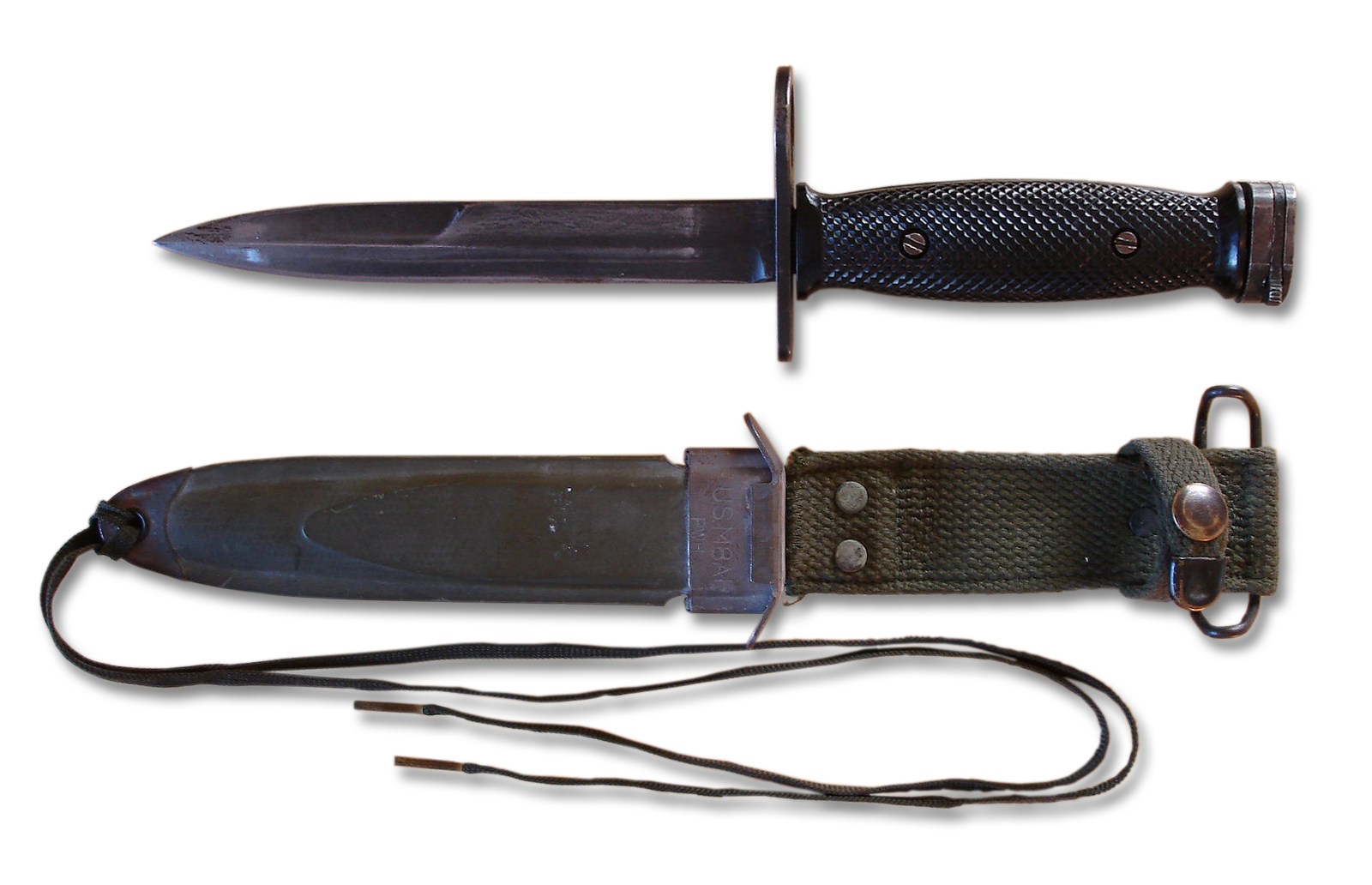
- M7 Bayonet & M8A1 Sheath
- Type: Bayonet
- Place of origin: United States

Service history
- In service: 1964–present
- Used by: US Military
- Wars: Vietnam War; Operation Urgent Fury; Gulf War; War in Afghanistan; Iraq War

Production history
- Designed: 1944 for M4 bayonet
- Manufacturer: Bauer Ord Company; Colt (manufacturer of the M16); Ontario Knife Company; Carl Eickhorn [for Colt]; Columbus Milpar & Mfg. (MIL-PAR); Conetta Mfg.; Eight Dollar Mountain Foundry (EDMF); Frazier Mfg.; General Cutlery (GEN CUT); Imperial Knife.
- Produced: 1964–present
- No. built: ~3 million

Specifications
- Length: 11.75 in (29.8 cm)
- Blade length: 6.75 in (17.1 cm)
- Blade type: Spear Point
- Scabbard/sheath: M8, M8A1, & M10

The M7 bayonet (NSN 1095-00-017-9701) is a bayonet that was used by the U.S. military for the M16 rifle, it can also be used with the M4 carbine as well as many other assault rifles, carbines, and combat shotguns. It can be used as a fighting knife and utility tool. It was introduced in 1964, when the M16 rifle entered service during the Vietnam War.

== Description ==
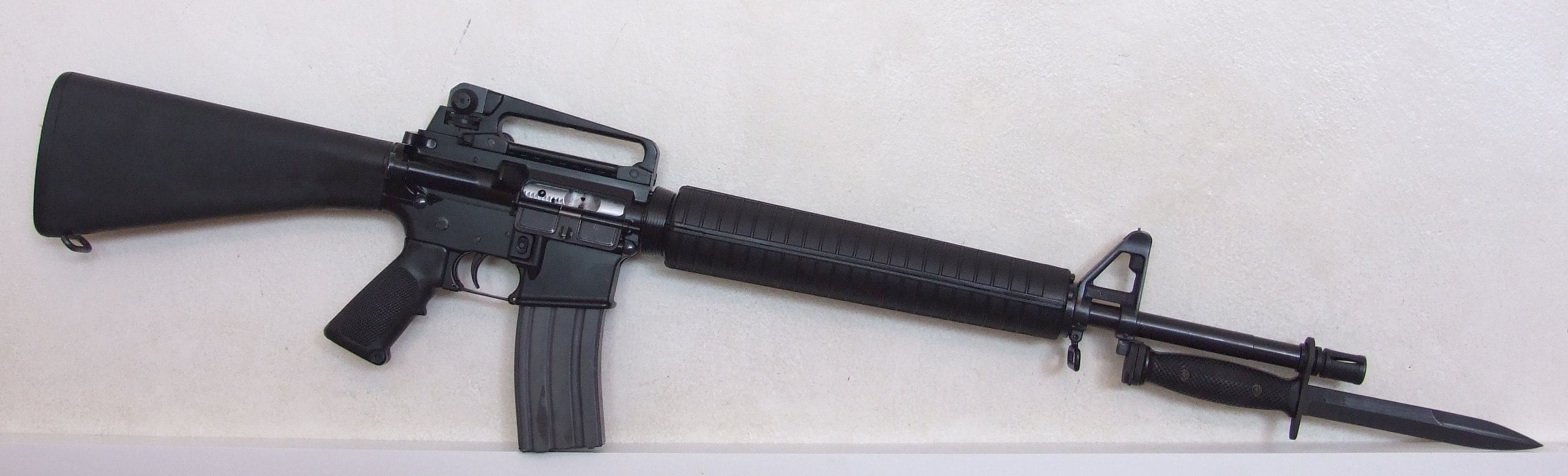
20” AR-15-style rifle with M7 bayonet affixed

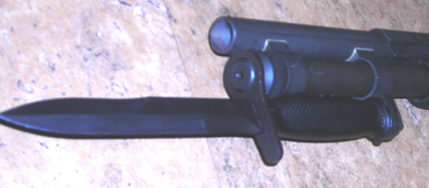
M7 Bayonet mounted on a Mossberg 590A1 shotgun

The M7 bayonet is very similar to the older M4 bayonet with the Korean War era plastic grips for the M1/M2 carbines except that the M7 has a much larger muzzle ring. The M7 has the same two-lever locking mechanism as the M4, that connects to a lug on the M16 rifle's barrel. The M4 (M1/M2 carbine), M5 (M1 rifle), and M6 bayonet (M14 rifle), are all derived from the World War II M3 fighting knife.

The M7 differs from M6 bayonet for the M14 rifle. Most notably, the diameter of the muzzle rings, and the locking mechanism. The M7's release mechanism is on the pommel, while the M6 has a spring-loaded lever near the guard that when depressed releases the bayonet. Both models are approximately the same length, have the same black finish, and use the M8A1 (NSN 1095-508-0339), or later M10 (NSN 1095-00-223-7164) sheath.

The M7's 1095 carbon steel blade is 6.75 in (17.1 cm) long, with an overall length of 11.75 in (29.8 cm). Blade width is 0.1875 in (0.476 cm) and it weighs about 9.6 oz (270 g). One edge is sharpened its full length while the opposite side of the blade has approximately 3 in (7.6 cm) sharpened. There are no markings on the blade itself.

The manufacturer's initials or name, along with "US M7", will be found stamped under the crossguard (see photo, right). The non-slip grips are molded black plastic. The steel parts have a uniform dark grey/black parkerized finish.

The M7 bayonet NSN is NSN 1095-00-017-9701. The initial contractor was Bauer Ord Company. Colt (manufacturer of the M16) and Ontario Knife Company made many of the M7 bayonets for the military and continue to make and sell them commercially. Other manufacturers included Carl Eickhorn [for Colt], Columbus Milpar & Mfg. (MIL-PAR), Conetta Mfg., Frazier Mfg., General Cutlery (GEN CUT), Ontario Knife Company, and Imperial Knife. The M7 was also manufactured in Canada, West Germany, the Philippines, Singapore, Israel, South Korea, and Australia.

=== Scabbards ===
==== M8 Scabbard ====
There are two variations of this scabbard, both with an olive drab fiberglass body with steel throat. The early version M8 scabbard only had a belt loop and lacked the double hook that earlier bayonet scabbards had for attaching to load carrying equipment such as the M1910 Haversack.

==== M8A1 Scabbard ====
The improved M8A1 scabbard manufactured later in WWII has the M1910 bent wire hook. The scabbard throat flange is stamped "US M8" or "US M8A1" on the flat steel part along with manufacturer initials. Some M8 scabbards were later modified by adding the M1910 hook. Later M8A1 scabbards were manufactured with a modified extended tab on the web hanger to provide more clearance for the M5 bayonet which rubbed against the wider bayonet handle. This sheath is correct for all post-war US bayonets including the M4, M5, M6, and M7. It was also used with the M3 fighting knife.

== Exploded view ==
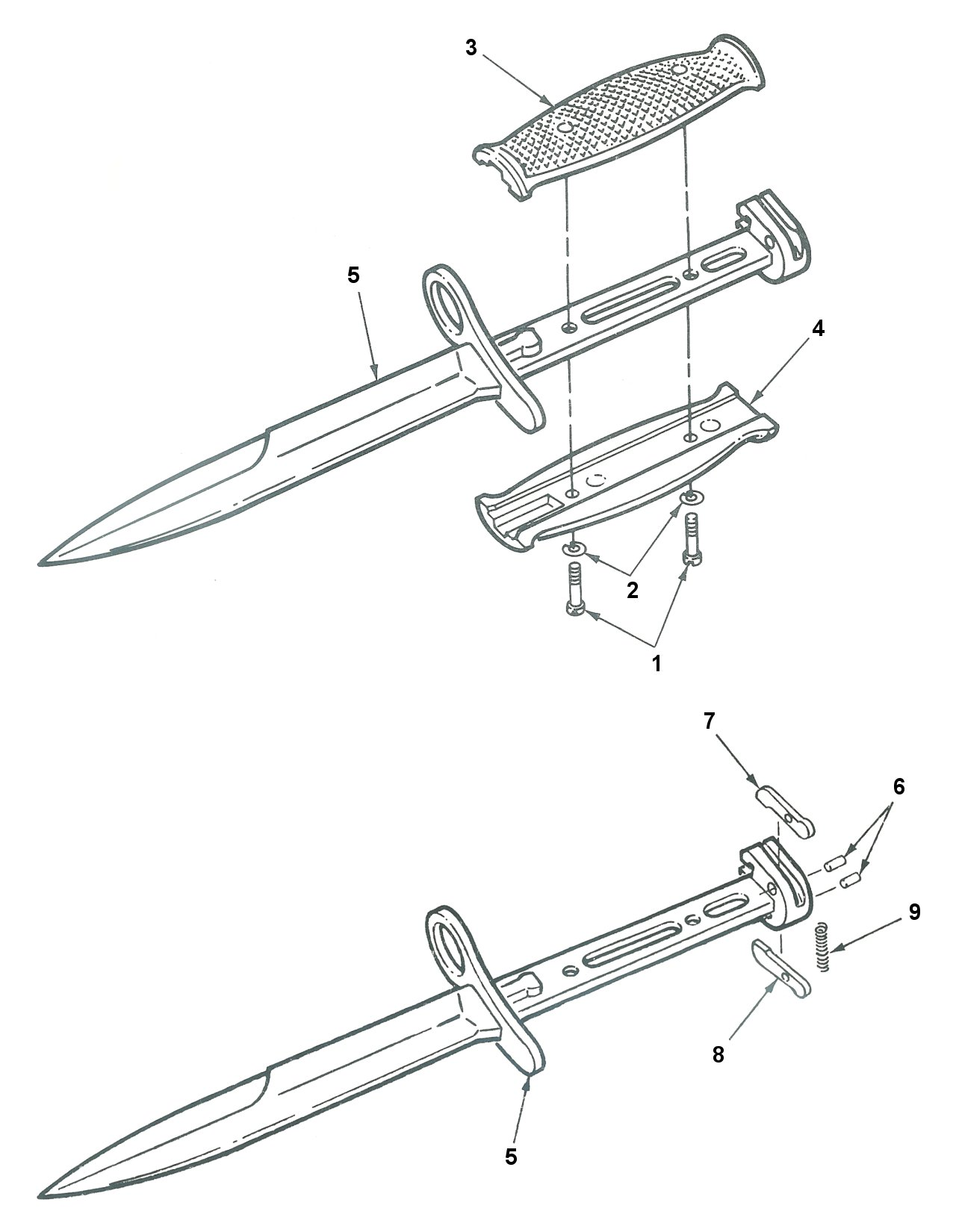

Bayonet-Knife M7	Item number
Screw, Machine, Grip	1
Washer, Lock	2
Grip, Bayonet-Knife, LH	3
Grip, Bayonet-Knife, RH	4
Blade Assembly M7	5
Pin, Spring	6
Lever, Lock-Release, LH	7
Lever, Lock-Release, RH	8
Spring, Helical, Compression	9

== Adoption ==
While the United States Army officially replaced the M7 with the M9 bayonet beginning in 1985, and the United States Marine Corps replaced it with the OKC-3S bayonet beginning in 2003, on-hand stocks may continue in service for many years.

== See also ==
- FN FNC
- M3 fighting knife
- M4 bayonet used by the M1 carbine
- M5 bayonet used by the M1 Garand
- M6 bayonet used by the M14 rifle
- M9 bayonet used by the M16 rifle and M4 carbine
- List of individual weapons of the U.S. Armed Forces
