= Wiegers =

Wiegers is a Dutch patronymic surname. The given name Wieger is a forms of the Germanic Wichard, from Wîh- ("battle") and -hard ("strong"). People with this surname include:

- Ben Wiegers (fl. 2006), Dutch curler and curling coach
- Jan Wiegers (1893–1959), Dutch expressionist painter
- Karl Wiegers (born 1953), American software engineer
- Patrick Wiegers (born 1990), German football goalkeeper
- Sandra Wiegers (born 1974), Dutch volleyball player

== See also ==
- Wieger (disambiguation)
- Wiegert, surname
- Wiggers, surname of the same origin
