= Wigger (disambiguation) =

Wigger is a term for a white person who imitates African American culture.

Wigger may also refer to:

- A maker of wigs
- Wigger (surname)
- Wigger (novel), a 1974 William Goldman novel
- Wigger I, a tenth-century count of Bilstein, in modern Hesse, Germany
- Wigger (river), also called the Wiggeren, a river in Switzerland
- "Wigger", a 2013 song by Anouk
- English eye dialect for Uyghur

== See also ==
- Wiggers, a Germanic patronymic surname
- Wigmore Hall, a recital venue, at 36 Wigmore Street, London; it is sometimes referred to as "Wiggers"
- Uyghur (disambiguation) (/ˈwiːɡʊər/), for the Turkic ethnic groups of Xinjiang, China and their languages
- Mask and Wig, a performing arts club at the University of Pennsylvania, members of which are known as "Mask and Wiggers"
