= Wieger =

Wieger may refer to:

- Wieger Mensonides (born 1938), Dutch swimmer
- David Michael Wieger, a screenwriter of Wild America
- Léon Wieger (1856–1933), French Jesuit missionary in China
- Wieger rifle series, a series of German firearms based on the AK-74

== See also ==
- Wiegert
- Wiegers
