= USP-1 =

Soviet small arms optic

USP-1 (1P29)
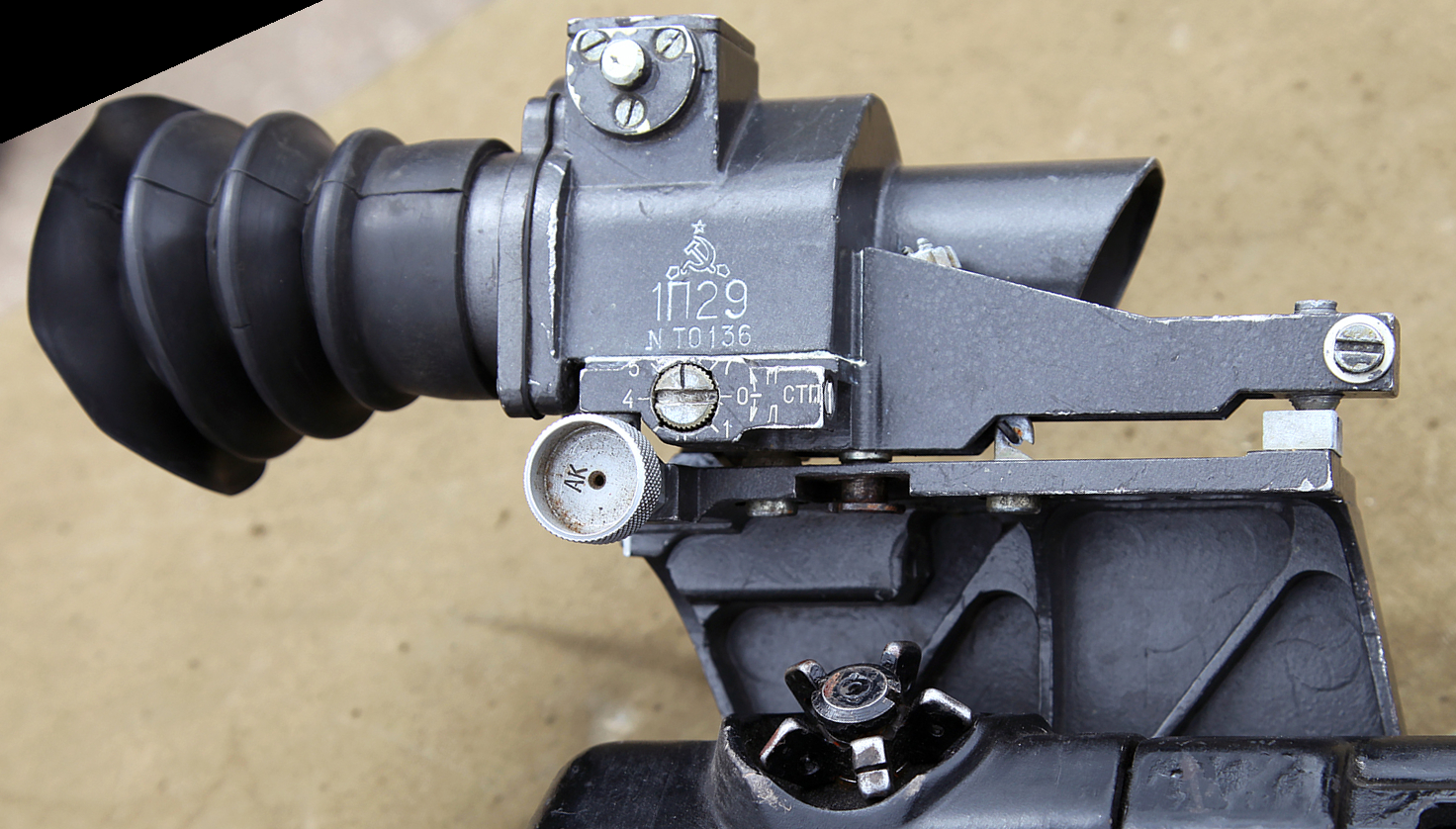
- A USP-1 mounted on an ASM trial rifle (AN-94).
- Place of origin: Soviet Union; Russia

Service history
- In service: 1988–present
- Wars: Annexation of Crimea by the Russian Federation; Chechen Wars; Algerian Civil War

Production history
- Designer: Royal Armaments Research Development Establishment (RARDE)
- Manufacturer: Novosibirsk instrument manufacturing factory

Specifications
- Length: 203 mm
- Width: 178 mm

USP-1 or "Tyulpan" (From Russian: Унифицированный Стрелковый Прицел, первый образец, Unifitsirovannyj Strelkovyj Pritsel, pervyj obrazets, "Unified Firearm Sight, first model, GRAU index 1P29) is a Soviet/Russian universal optic sight, used on the AK rifle family (AKMN, AK-74N, AK-74M, AK-101, AK-102, AK-105), the RPK-74N, the PKMN and the PKP "Pecheneg" and is designed for quick-mounting and quick-detaching. Compared with an open mechanical sight, the effectiveness of firing at targets is increased 1.2 to 2 times, and the time taken to conduct a firing session is reduced by 60%.

== Design ==
The sight possesses a mechanism for adjustments and a stadiametric rangefinder. No batteries are required in the sight. The optic scheme of the sight is a prismatic wrapping. It is easily mounted on the weapon using the standard Warsaw Pact rail.

== Specifications ==
- Sight weight: 0.8 kg
- Weight of a complete sight system: 1.25 kg
- Magnification: 4x
- Field of view: 8 (14) degrees
- Exit pupil diameter: 6.5 mm
- Exit pupil length: 35 mm
- Resolution limit: 13 sec
- Amount of light retained: >70 %
- Adjustment range for zeroing: 0 – 400 m for vertical and horizontal adjustments
- Dimensions (L x H x W): 203 mm x 80 mm x 178 mm

== Literature (in Russian) ==
- Изделие 1П29. Техническое описание и инструкция по эксплуатации, АЛ3.812.129 ТО. — 1994 г.
- Оружие ближнего боя России / Альманах. — М.: НО «Лига содействия оборонным предприятиям», 2010. — 660 с. — ISBN 978-5-904540-04-3
