= AK-100 =

AK-100 may refer to:

- AK-100 Naval gun, a Russian 100mm naval gun system
- AK-100 (rifle family), Russian assault rifle family
