= 1P78 Kashtan =

1P78-1 Kashtan
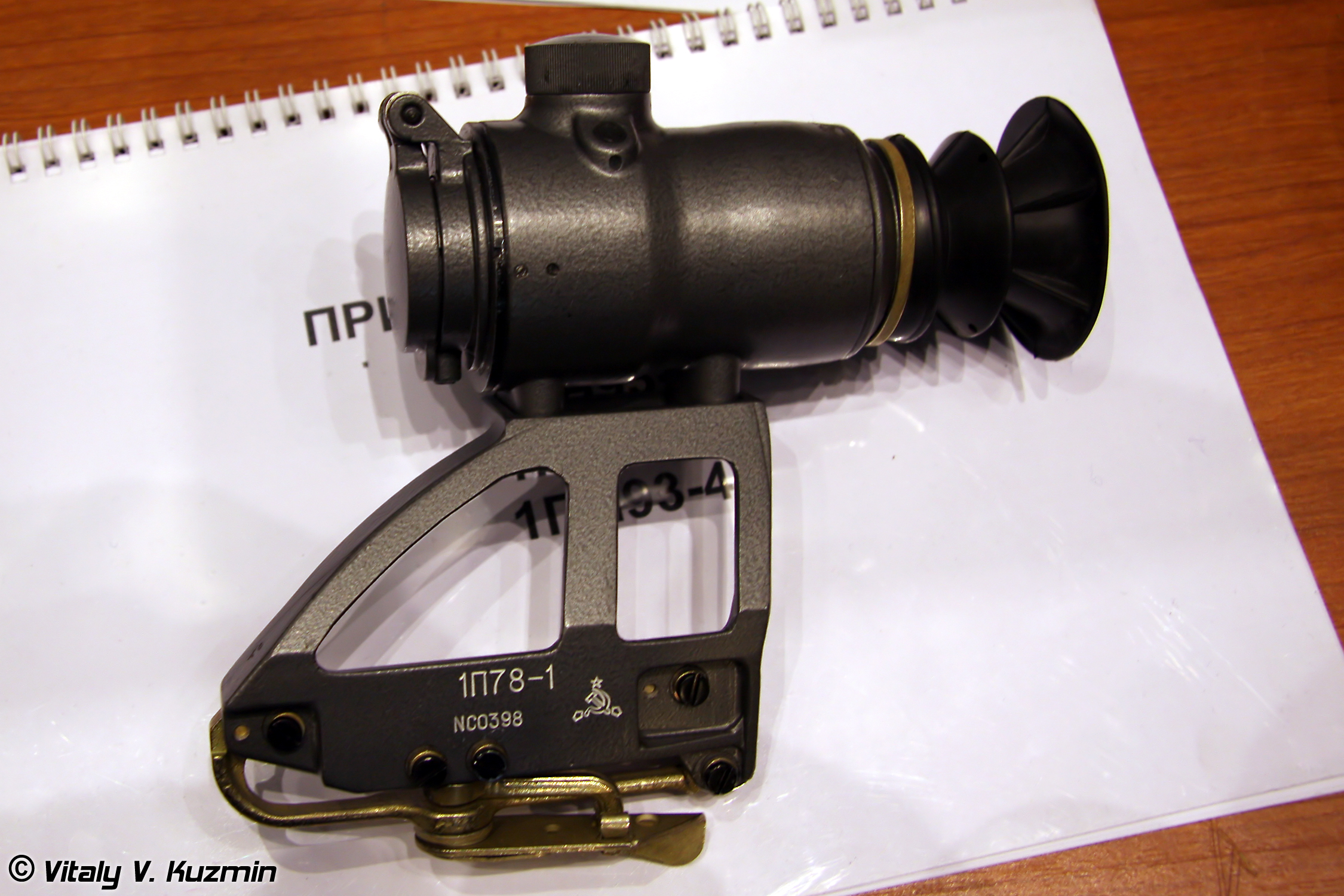
- 1P78-1 Kashtan sight
- Type: Telescopic sight
- Place of origin: Russian Federation

Specifications
- Mass: 0.7-0.75 kg.

1P78 is a telescopic sight manufactured by Novosibirsk Instrument-Making Plant and in use with the Russian Armed Forces, intended as a replacement for the older PSO-1 and 1P29 scopes currently being used by the Russian military. The optic is intended to become the standard issue sight for the infantry riflemen within the Russian military.

== Design ==
With a magnification of 2.8x, it is similar to the Trijicon ACOG series of optical gun sights, as well as other Soviet designs like the PO 3.5x21P and 1P29.

The 1P78-1 weighs 1.1lbs. Like many Russian sights, it has a rubber eye cup. The scope is illuminated by tritium to aid in aiming and target acquisition in low light settings, and does not require batteries to illuminate the reticle.

=== Zeroing ===
The reticle consists of a series of chevrons, the topmost being zeroed at 400 meters, with each descending chevron indicating points of aim at 100 meter intervals beyond the main 400 meter zero. Inside the main chevron lies a dot that was implemented to be used against targets that are 500 meters from the operator; the second and third chevrons are for targets that are 600 and 700 meters away. While this scope does not have the range calculating system that the PSO implements, it is possible to use the dimensions of the hash marks to calculate range.

== Mounting system ==
The 1P78 is mounted by means of the standard side rail found in other Soviet and Russian weapons designated with the -N suffix. The sight is centered over the bore of the weapon. It has an adjustable lens cap that can rotate freely that incorporates a spring-loaded detent that keeps it from moving around. The use of the 1P78 blocks the iron sights of the weapon.

The 1P78P variant can be mounted on a Weaver rail.

== Specifications ==
- Magnification: 2.8x
- Objective Diameter: 25 mm
- Weight: 1.1 lbs

== See also ==
- Reticle
- AK-74
- Tritium radioluminescence
- PSO-1

== Gallery ==
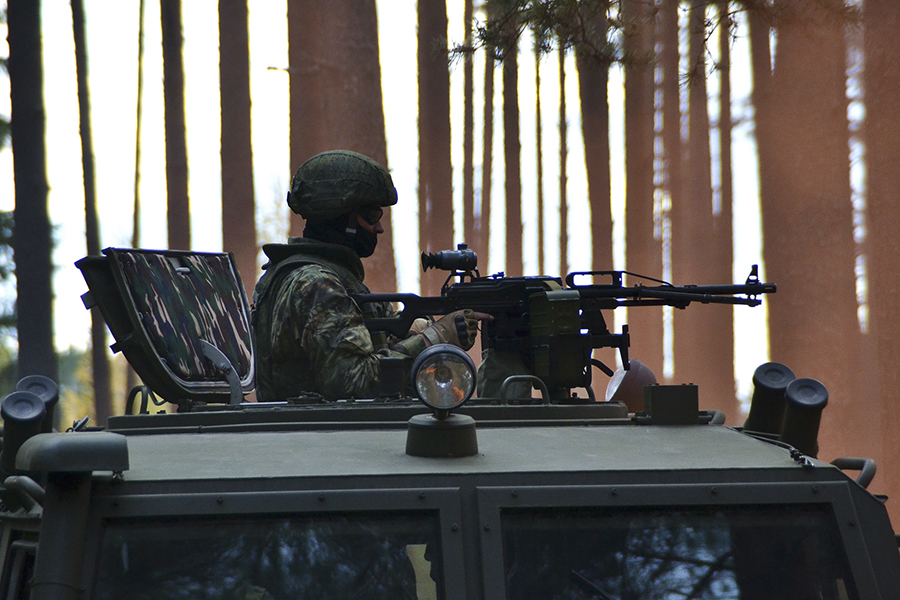
Russian soldier using PKP Pecheneg with Kashtan sight

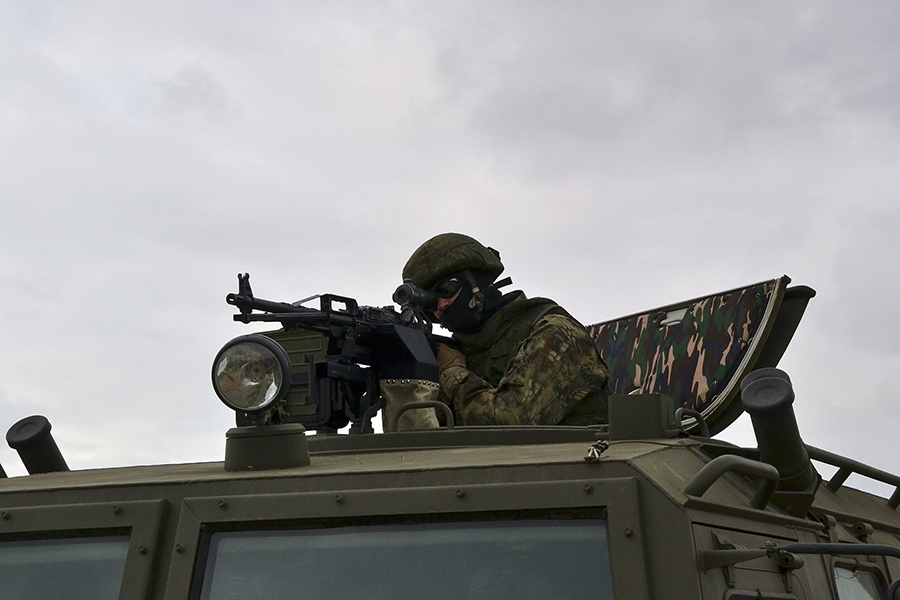
Russian soldier using PKP Pecheneg with Kashtan sight
