= Uygur =

Uygur may refer to:

- Uygur (name), a common Turkish surname
- Cenk Uygur, a Turkish-American politician, media host, and political commentator

== Places ==
- Uygur, Amasya, a town in the District of Amasya, Amasya Province, Turkey
- Uygur District, a district of Almaty Region in Kazakhstan

== See also ==
- Uyghur (disambiguation)
