= AK-205 =

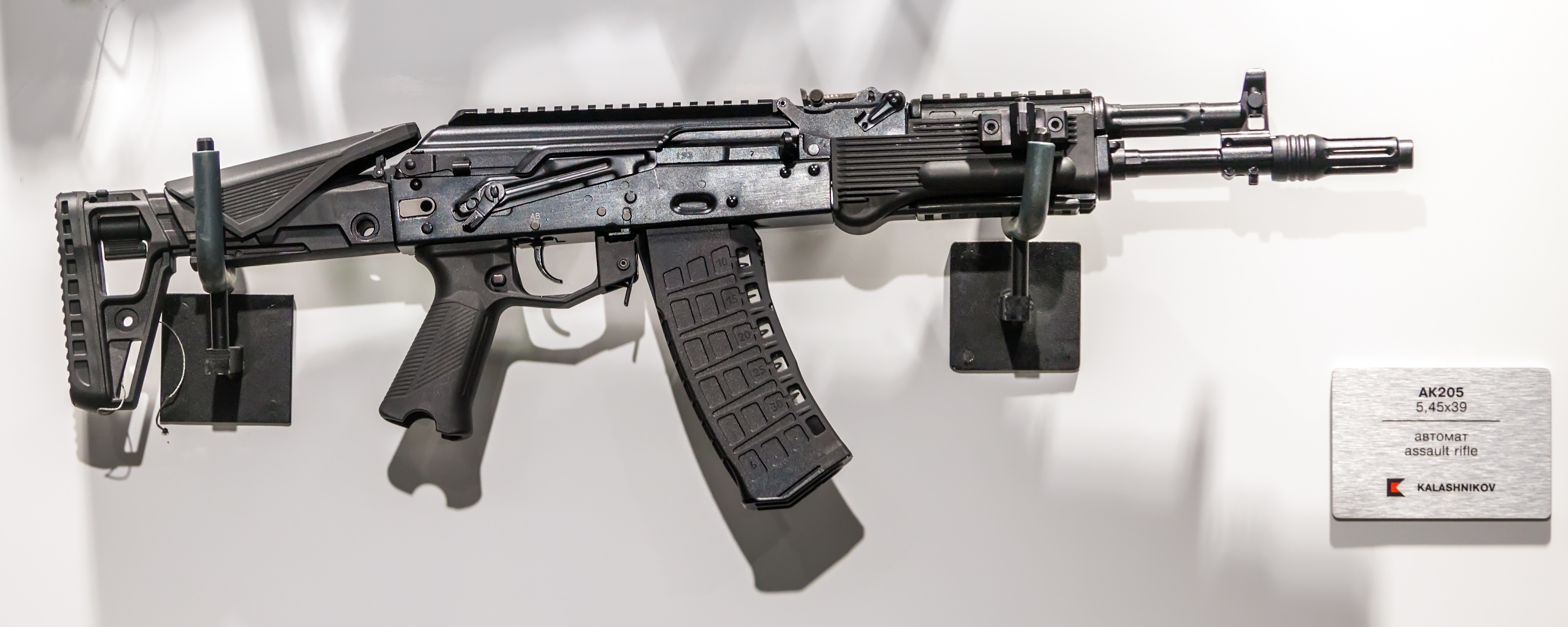
- The AK-205 carbine
- Type: Assault Rifle, Carbine
- Place of origin: Russia

Production history
- Designer: Mikhail Kalashnikov
- Designed: 2009-2011, 2016-2018
- Manufacturer: Kalashnikov Concern

Specifications
- Mass: 3.7 kg (8.2 lb) with empty magazine
- Length: 850 mm (33 in) (stock extended); 790 mm (31 in) (stock retracted); 605 mm (23.8 in) (stock folded)
- Barrel length: 314 mm (12.4 in)
- Cartridge: 5.45×39mm
- Caliber: 5.45mm
- Action: Gas-actuated, rotating bolt
- Rate of fire: 700 rounds/min
- Muzzle velocity: 840 m/s (2,800 ft/s)
- Effective firing range: 500 m (1,600 ft)
- Feed system: 30-round detachable box magazine or 60-round casket magazine
- Sights: Adjustable iron sights or picatinny rails for various optics

The AK-205 is a carbine chambered in 5.45×39mm. The AK-205 is a modernized version of the AK-105, which in turn is a shortened carbine version of the AK-74M. The AK-205 was originally known as AK-105M before being renamed ''AK-205'' in 2018. The AK 200 series AK-205, AK-202 and AK-204 are very similar in design, the only differences being the chambering, barrel length and magazine type.

The AK-205 belongs to the AK-200 series which also includes the AK-200, AK-201, AK-202, AK-203 and AK-204.

== History ==
The AK-205's development was stopped around 2011, but resumed around 2016. The AK-205 was then introduced in 2018; orders were made by the Rosgvardia for the AK-205.

== Design ==
The AK-205 features picatinny rails on the receiver cover, upper-handguard and lower-handguard with an optional quad-rail system, allowing the mount of modular accessories including advanced optical sights, lasers, flashlights, vertical foregrips, bipods and grenade launchers.

The gun's safety lever also has an extended shelf for the trigger finger. The AK-205's receiver cover is hinged on the rear sight block with a retaining lever in the back which is responsible for maintaining and securing zero. Its selector allows for single and full auto mode with a rate of fire at 700 rounds per minute.

The AK-205 also uses a birdcage-type hybrid flashhider with compensator design features. The AK-205 has a foldable and adjustable telescopic buttstock which can be adjusted to 4 positions, the stock also hosts a cleaning rod. All of these design features are also available on all the other AK-200 series rifles.

== Users ==
- Russia: Reported orders by the Rosgvardia in 2018.
