= AK-100 (assault rifles and carbines) =

Assault rifle and carbine series of firearms

The AK-100 family is a series of Kalashnikov rifles, based upon the AK-74M, intended for export sales. The family of rifles offers the AK-74M system, in multiple cartridges and lengths.

== AK-100 series ==
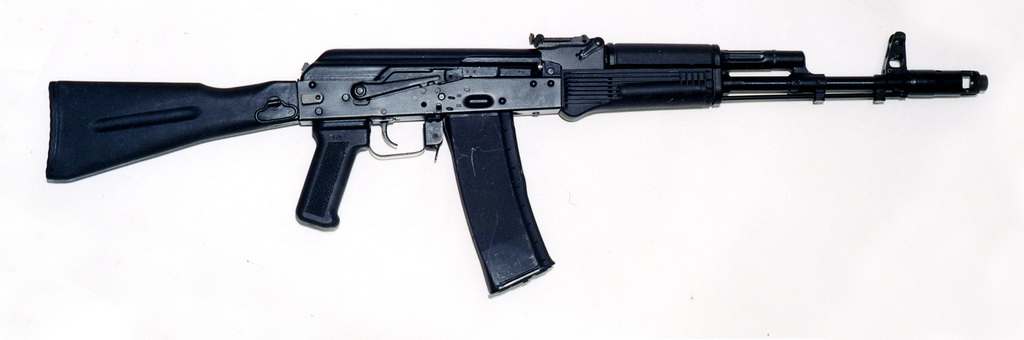
5.56×45mm AK-101 assault rifle.

The original AK-100 series rifles were officially offered for export since March 1993 and are categorized by all having black polymer handguards, folding polymer stocks, and use of AK-74M internal systems. Parts are highly interchangeable.

Chambering	Assault Rifle	Carbine
5.56×45mm NATO	AK-101	AK-102
7.62×39mm	AK-103	AK-104
5.45×39mm	AK-74M	AK-105
9×39mm		AK-9

Even with those differences all of the rifles are made to similar specifications.

- Both long rifles had a barrel length of 415 mm, and all the carbines had a barrel length of 314 mm.
- Both long rifles (unloaded) weighted 3.6 kg, and all the carbines: 3.2 kg.
- All the rifles had a selector for with: safe, semi auto, or full auto. Also, both long rifles also had a variant with 3 round burst called AK-10X-3 and a semi auto only variant called AK-10X-1

Rifles in the 100 series have been exported to and/or adopted by a variety of countries, notably: Armenia, Cyprus, Indonesia, Iran, Pakistan, Saudi Arabia, Serbia, Syria, Uruguay, and Venezuela.

The AK-105 has also seen some domestic use, filling a niche role as a middle ground between the AK-74M and AKS-74U.

=== Related development ===
Later Kalashnikov started offering the AK-107 / AK-108 (in order 5.45×39, 5.56×45) models. Externally they are very similar to the AK-100 series (with some minor differences) and are offered in the same calibers. Internally they use a radically different gas system and incorporate the Balanced Automatics Recoil System (BARS).

== AK-100M/200 series ==
The AK-100M/AK-200 rifle family was initially conceived around 2009 as an improved variant of the basic AK-100 series. The development of the AK-100M/AK-200 family was stopped around 2011 but resumed around 2016. In 2017, Kalashnikov unveiled the modernized versions of the AK-100 family of rifles. Main key takeaways compared to the AK-100 variants is the additional picatinny rails, accurized barrel, improved flash hider device, pinned barrel components instead of pressed in. Additionally, the handguard possesses 4 rails instead of two, with a rail on the top of the dustcover, which is hinged. Overall, it is considerably designed to use modern optics compared to its predecessor.

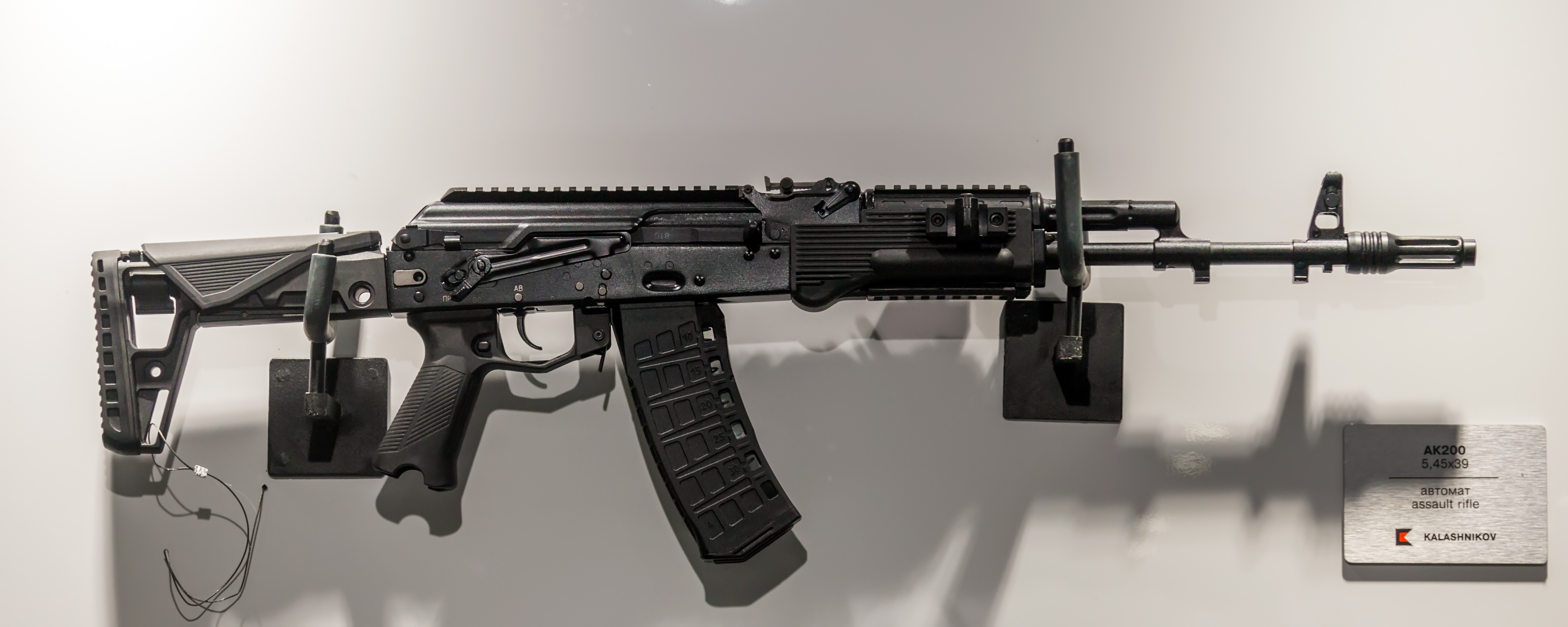
5.45×39mm AK-200 assault rifle

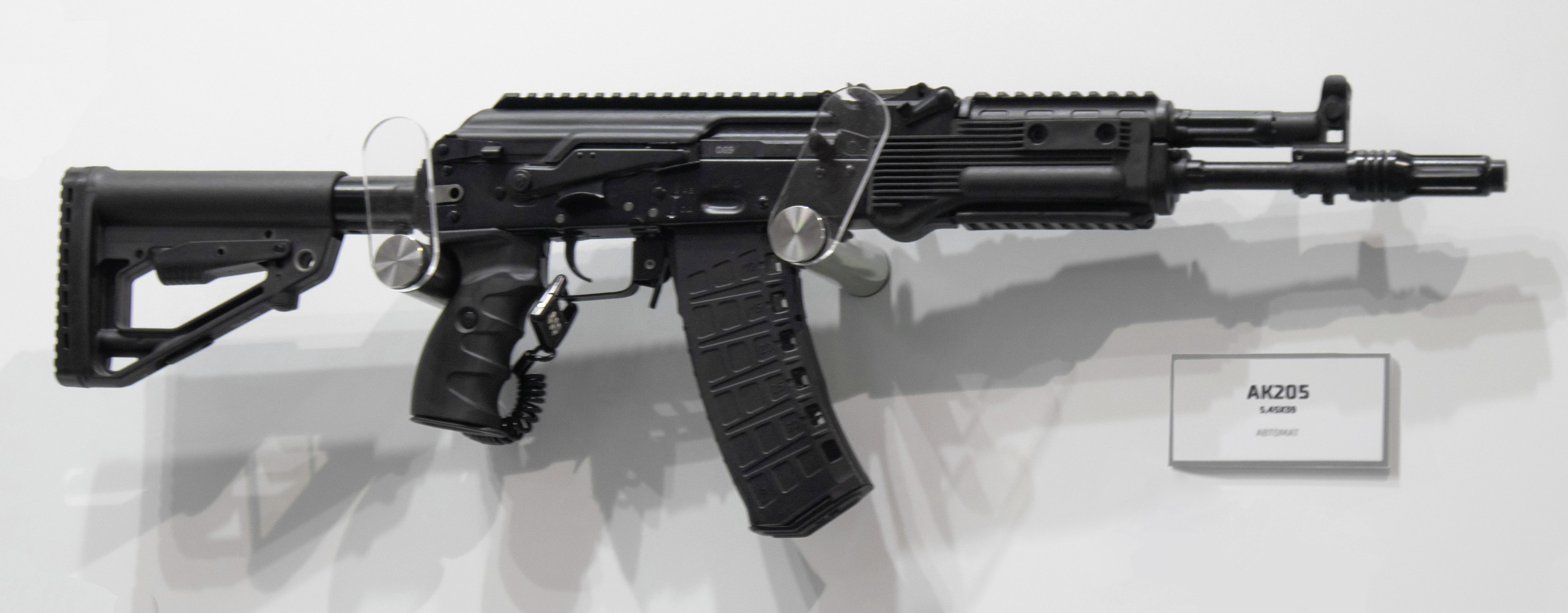
5.45×39mm AK-205 carbine

As of 2018, the AK-200 series rifles are offered for export sales and for domestic law enforcement users in Russia. The AK-200 series are based on the AK-100 series and the AK-12. They can be chambered in 5.45×39mm, 5.56×45mm NATO and 7.62×39mm, and use a barrel and gas system assembly and iron sights line similar to that of the AK-74M/AK-100 rifle family. Improvements added from the AK-12 include Picatinny rails, a new pistol grip, a new adjustable buttstock and a new flash hider. They feed from 30-round magazines, and are compatible with drum magazines from the RPK and RPK-74.

The models of the AK-200 series are:

Chambering	Assault Rifle	Carbine
5.45×39mm	AK-200	AK-205
5.56×45mm NATO	AK-201	AK-202
7.62×39mm	AK-203	AK-204

On 3 March 2019, Russia and India inaugurated Indo-Russia Rifles in Uttar Pradesh, India to produce AK-203 assault rifles. However, no contract had been signed then or rifles produced because of pricing disagreements. India signed a contract in August 2021 to directly import 70,000 AK-203 rifles from Russia. Russia and India on December 6, 2021, finally signed a contract on the delivery of over 600,000 7.62mm AK-203 assault rifles that will be produced on India's soil to the republic's Defense Ministry.

== Users ==
- Algeria: AK-103: Used by the Parachute Commando Regiments
- Armenia: AK-103: The licensed production of the AK-103 started in July 2020. AK-105
- Azerbaijan: AK-105: Used by the State Border Service.
- Ethiopia: AK-103: The Gafat Armament Engineering Complex produces the AK-103 rifle in Ethiopia. Supplements the AKM and AK-47 in the Ethiopian Armed Forces. It was reported in 2014 that the deal didn't go through at all.
- Fiji: AK-101
- India: AK-103: Used by the MARCOS of the Indian Navy and 70k were ordered by the Indian Air Force.
- Indonesia: AK-101: Indonesian Marine Corps and the Mobile Brigade Corps. AK-102: 5,000 AK-101 and AK-102s used by government for Operation Madago Raya.
- Iran: AK-103: The sale of an undisclosed number of AK-103s for use by sections of the Iranian special forces and marines and use by Islamic Revolutionary Guard Corps special forces was reported. The IRGC is reported to be using the AK-103.
- Kazakhstan: AK-105: The Kazakh military use the AK-105 as a standard-issue carbine rifle.
- Kenya: AK-101
- Libya: AK-103: Seen in the hands of anti-Gaddafi forces and loyalists in numerous photos. The rifles in use are the AK-103-2 version.
- Malaysia: AK-102: Limited use by the Royal Malaysian Navy's PASKAL.
- Maldives: AK-103: Used by Maldives National Defence Force
- Namibia: AK-103: Used by Namibian Marine Corps AK-105: Used by Namibian Marine Corps
- North Korea: AK-105: Produced locally as an unlicensed copy, the Type 88 carbine, used by Special Operations Forces and armored crews.
- Pakistan: AK-103: Unlicensed Clone "PK-21" in production by Pakistan Ordnance Factories.
- Palestine: AK-103: Used by the Izz ad-Din al-Qassam Brigades.
- Russia: AK-103: Used by Spetsnaz GRU, SSO, selective VDV and Russian Naval Infantry units, Wagner Group, Alpha Group and Police / Spetsnaz units of the Ministry of Internal Affairs. AK-104: Used by the Russian Federal Protective Service. AK-105: In service with the Russian Army, and limited use within the Ministry of Internal Affairs and other law enforcement, including Alpha Group of the Federal Security Service (FSB).
- Saudi Arabia: AK-103: A license to produce AK-103 rifles was granted to Saudi Arabia in 2017.
- Syria: AK-103: Captured from rebels. Used by the Syrian Arab Army. AK-104: A batch of AK-104's have reportedly been delivered to Syria's Interior Ministry Anti-Terrorism Syrian Special Mission Forces in the Eastern Ghouta front in Rif Dimashq. AK-105: Used by some Syrian special forces.
- Thailand: AK-102: Used by Volunteer Defense Corps AK-104: Directorate of Logistics procured from Russian Federation.
- Uruguay: AK-101 AK-103: 500 AK-103s for the Uruguayan National Guard.
- Venezuela: AK-103: First 30,000 AK-103 rifles were received in June 2006. Made under license by CAVIM. CAVIM's AK-103 factories opened officially in 2012 without the necessary manufacturing equipment. CAVIM-made AK-103s were delivered to the Venezuelan Army in 2013. Due to trouble with the plant with the Russian contractor failing to meet deadlines with a case of fraud, which forced CAVIM to finish the rest of the construction with manufacturing to start by 2019, full-scale production of ammunition started in July 2025 with a capacity of 70 million rounds a year. AK-104: Produced under license by CAVIM alongside the AK-103.
- Yemen: AK-103: AK-103s made in Yemen as reported in February 2022. AK-104: In service with some units of the Yemeni Army.

=== Non-state actors ===
- Hezbollah: AK-103: AK-103s recovered by the IDF.
- Hurras al-Din: AK-103
- Movement for Oneness and Jihad in West Africa: AK-103: Used an ex-Libyan AK-103-2 in Agadez and Arlit attacks in 2013.

== Conflicts ==
=== 2000s ===
- Papua conflict (1962–present)
- Insurgency in Aceh (1976–2005)
- War in Afghanistan (2001–2021)
- Insurgency in the Maghreb (2002–present)
- Iraq War (2003–2011)
- Southern Thailand insurgency (2004–present)

=== 2010s ===
- Libyan crisis (2011–present)
- Syrian civil war (2011–2024)
- War in Iraq (2013–2017)
- Yemeni civil war (2014–present)
- Saudi-led intervention in the Yemeni civil war (2015–ongoing)
- Houthi–Saudi Arabian conflict (2015–present)
- Operation Madago Raya (2016–2022)

=== 2020s ===
- Tigray war (2020–2022)
- Russo-Ukrainian war (2022–present)
- Fano insurgency (2023–present)
- Gaza war (2023–present)

== See also ==
- Colt CK901
- RK 62
