= Wigger (surname) =

Wigger is the surname of the following notable people:

- Arndt Wigger (born 1943), German linguist
- Deena Wigger (born 1966), American sports shooter
- Friedrich Wigger (1825–1886), German archivist
- Jeremias Wigger (born 1975), Swiss cross country skier
- John Wiggers (1917–2007), American professional basketball player
- Lones Wigger (1937–2017), American sports shooter, father of Deena
- Michèle Wigger, Swiss and French information theorist
- Nick Wiger (born 1980), American comedian, improviser, podcast personality, and television writer
- Ralf Harold Wigger (1899–1974), American character actor
- Siri Wigger (born 2003), Swiss cross-country skier
- Stefan Wigger (1932–2013), German television actor
- Winand Wigger (1841–1901), American Bishop of Newark

== See also ==
- Wiggers
