= Uygur (name) =

Uygur is a Turkish surname as well as sometimes a given name. Its meaning is "cultivated", "civilized".

Notable people with the surname include:

- Barış Uygur (born 1978), Turkish writer, journalist and screenwriter
- Burak Uygur (born 1995), Turkish karateka
- Cenk Uygur (born 1970), Turkish-American columnist, political commentator and activist
- Nejat Uygur (1927–2013), Turkish actor and comedian
