= Uyghur =

Uyghur may refer to:

- Uyghurs, a Turkic ethnic group living in Eastern and Central Asia
  - Uyghur language, a Turkic language spoken primarily by the Uyghurs
    - Old Uyghur language, a different Turkic language spoken in the Uyghur Khaganate
    - Uyghur alphabets, any of four systems used to write the language
  - Uyghur Khaganate, a Turkic empire in the mid 8th and 9th centuries
- Uygur, Kulp, a village in Turkey

== See also ==
- Xinjiang Uyghur Autonomous Region
- Yugur, or Yellow Uyghur, another ethnic group of China
  - Western Yugur language, the Turkic language spoken by the Yugur people and descending from Old Uyghur
  - Eastern Yugur language, the Mongolic language spoken within the Yugur ethnic group
- Uygur (disambiguation)
