= AK-102 =

Shortened carbine version of the AK-101 rifle

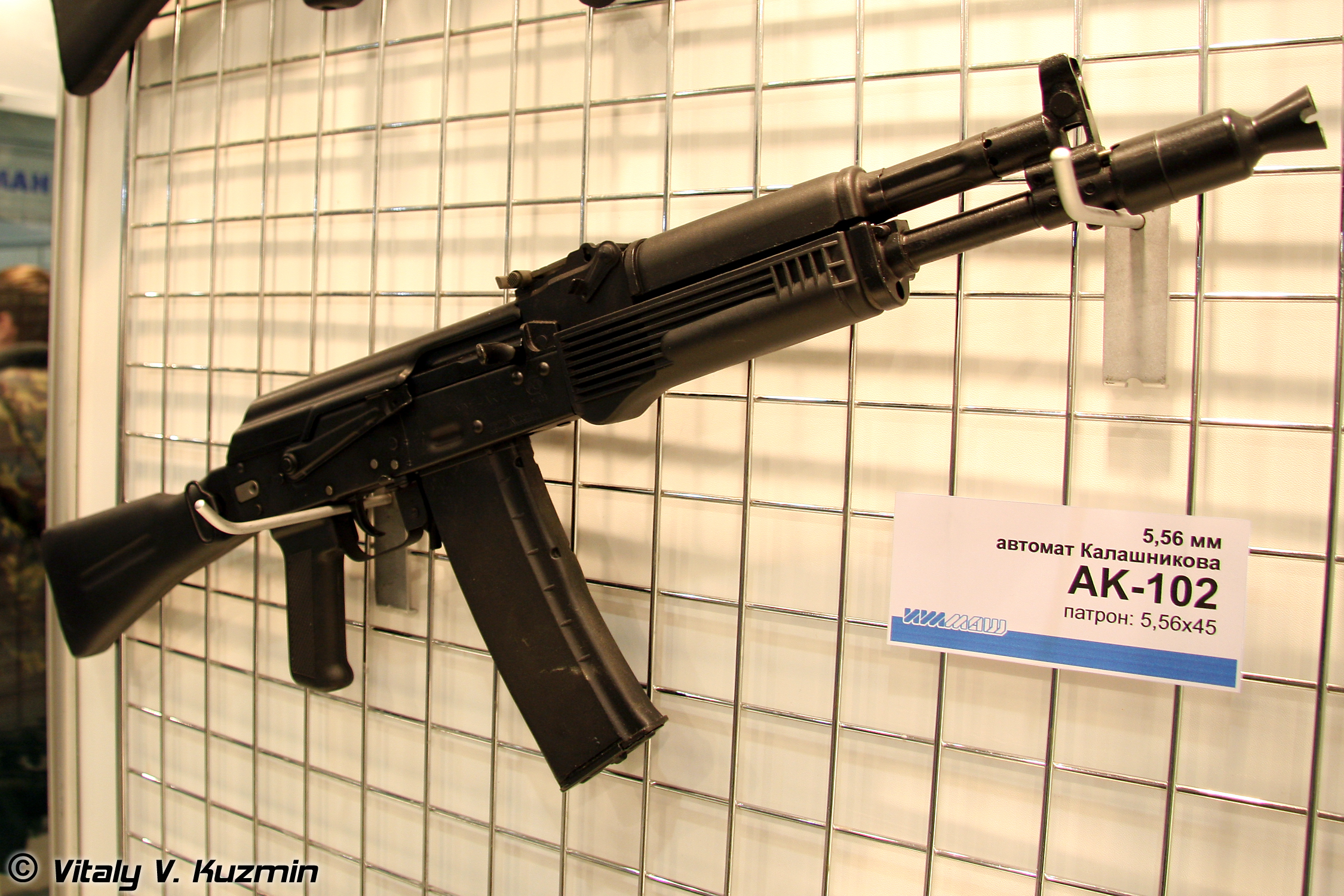
- Type: Assault rifle, carbine
- Place of origin: Russia

Service history
- In service: 2000–present
- Wars: Insurgency in Aceh, Papua conflict, Operation Madago Raya, South Thailand insurgency

Production history
- Designer: Mikhail Kalashnikov
- Designed: 1994
- Manufacturer: Kalashnikov Concern
- Variants: See Variants

Specifications
- Mass: 3.0 kg (6.6 lb) without magazine
- Length: 824 mm (32.4 in), 586 mm (23.1 in) folded
- Barrel length: 314 mm (12.4 in)
- Cartridge: 5.56×45mm NATO
- Caliber: 5.56mm
- Action: Gas-actuated, rotating bolt
- Rate of fire: 600 rounds/minute
- Muzzle velocity: 850 m/s (2,789 ft/s)
- Effective firing range: 500 m (550 yd)
- Feed system: 30-round detachable box magazine
- Sights: Adjustable iron sights, Equipped with optical plate for attaching various scopes

The AK-102 is a shortened carbine version of the AK-101 rifle, which was derived from the original AK-47 design and its AK-74 successor.

The AK-102 is chambered to fire 5.56×45mm NATO ammunition, and is made exclusively for export purposes.

== Design ==
Compared to the AK-101 and AK-103, which are full-size rifles of similar design, the AK-102, 104, and 105 feature shortened barrels that make them a middle ground between a full rifle and the more compact AKS-74U. Whereas the AK-100 family rifles have longer barrels, full-length gas pistons, and solid, side-folding polymer stocks, the AKS-74U is shorter, with a skeleton stock.

The rifle's receiver is made of stamped steel. The magazine is lighter, and more durable than older models, being made out of reinforced fiberglass. The stock is made of shock-resistant polymer and folds, making it easier to use from vehicles or on the move.

The AK-102 uses an adjustable, notched, rear tangent iron sight; it is calibrated in 100 m (109 yard) increments from 100 to 500 meters (109 to 547 yards). The front sight is post-adjustable for elevation in the field if needed. Horizontal adjustment is done by the factory or armory before issue. The AK-102 has a muzzle booster derived from the AKS-74U.

== Variants ==
=== KP-102 ===
The KP-102 is a 12.5 inch, pistol-based version of the KR-101 and KR-102 made by Kalashnikov-USA. In the United States, import of Kalashnikov rifles made by Kalashnikov Concern was banned by the Obama Administration in 2014.

The difference in naming, i.e. KR-102 instead of AK-102, is because "Kalashnikov-USA is unrelated in operation and sales to Kalashnikov Concern" as Kalashnikov-USA does not operate under an authorized agreement with Kalashnikov Concern.

== Users ==
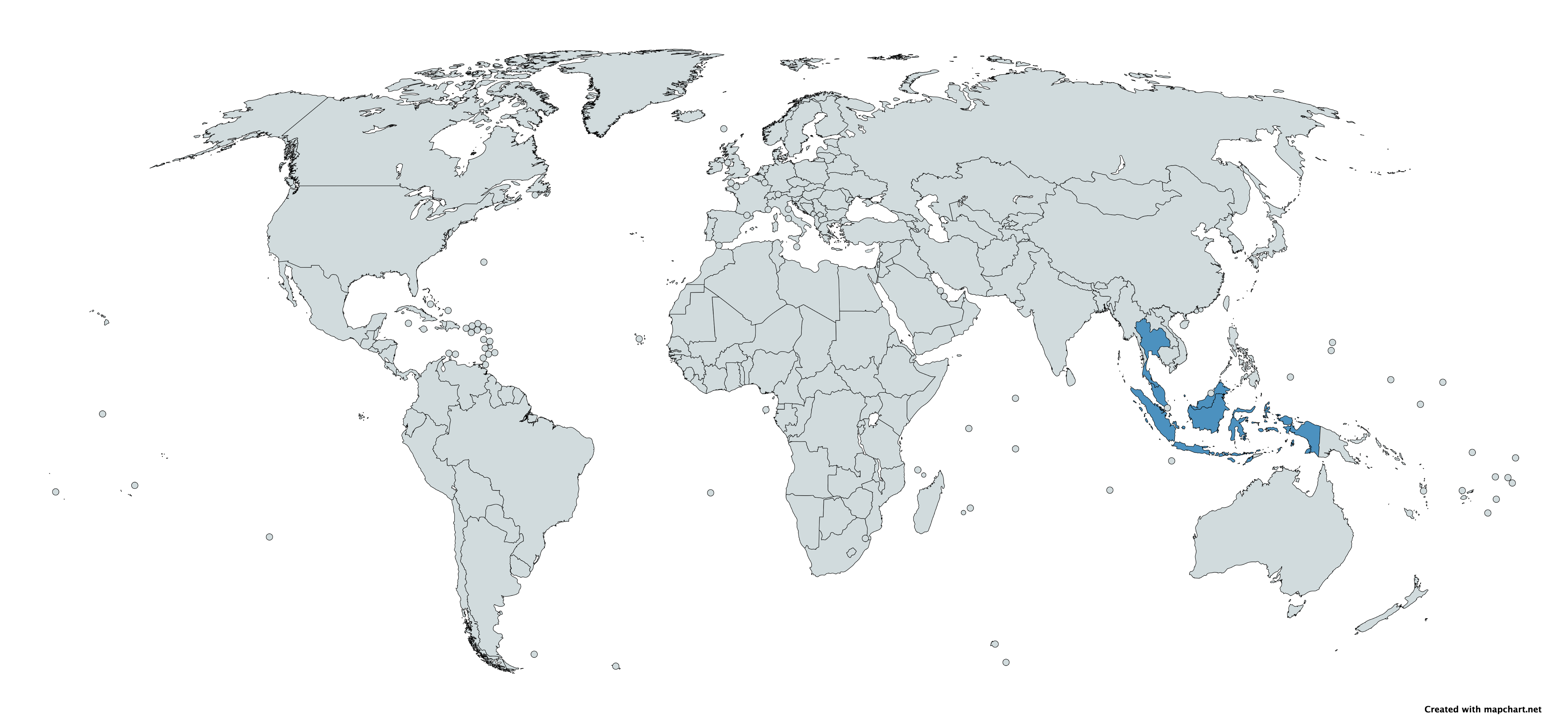
A map with AK-102 users in blue

- Indonesia: 5,000 AK-101 and AK-102s used by government for Operation Madago Raya.
- Malaysia: Limited use by the Royal Malaysian Navy's PASKAL.
- Thailand: Used by Volunteer Defense Corps
