= AK-74 =

1974 Soviet 5.45×39mm assault rifle

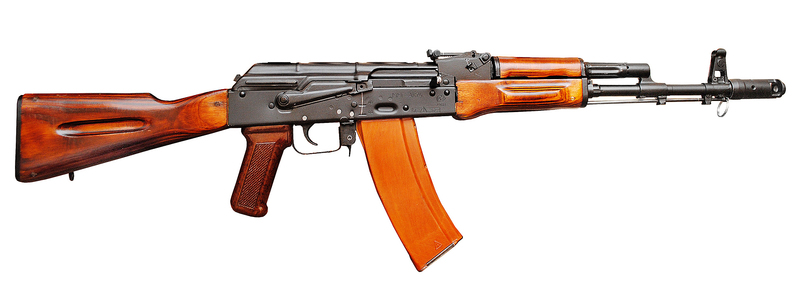
- Early AK-74 with magazine made of AG-4S polymer and laminated wood furniture
- Type: Assault rifle
- Place of origin: Soviet Union

Service history
- In service: 1974–present; 1991–present (AK-74M)
- Used by: See Users
- Wars: Soviet–Afghan War; Kurdish-Turkish conflict (1978–present); Lord's Resistance Army insurgency; Sri Lankan Civil War; Afghan Civil War (1989–1992); Yugoslav Wars; Croatian War of Independence; Georgian Civil War; Transnistria War; Afghan Civil War (1992–1996); Tajikistani Civil War; East Prigorodny Conflict; The Troubles; Burundian Civil War; First Chechen War; Batken Conflict; Second Chechen War; War in Afghanistan; Iraq War; Russo-Georgian War; Insurgency in the North Caucasus; First Libyan Civil War; Russo-Ukrainian War; War in Donbas; Russo-Ukrainian war (2022–present); Syrian Civil War; War in Iraq; Yemeni Civil War; Saudi Arabian-led intervention in Yemen; Saudi Arabian–Yemeni border conflict; 2016 Nagorno-Karabakh conflict; Second Nagorno-Karabakh War; 2021 Kyrgyzstan–Tajikistan clashes; 2022 Kyrgyzstan–Tajikistan clashes; 2023 Azerbaijani offensive in Nagorno-Karabakh

Production history
- Designer: Mikhail Kalashnikov
- Designed: AK-74: 1974; AK-74M: 1991
- Manufacturer: Kalashnikov Concern (formerly Izhmash)
- Produced: AK-74: 1974–1991; AK-74M: 1991–present
- No. built: 5,000,000+
- Variants: See Variants

Specifications
- Mass: AK-74: 3.07 kg (6.8 lb); AKS-74: 2.97 kg (6.5 lb); AK-74M: 3.4 kg (7.5 lb) without magazine; 30-round magazine: 0.23 kg (0.51 lb); 6H5 bayonet: 0.32 kg (0.71 lb)
- Length: AK-74: 943 mm (37.1 in); AKS-74 (stock extended): 943 mm (37.1 in); AKS-74 (stock folded): 690 mm (27.2 in); AK-74M (stock extended): 943 mm (37.1 in); AK-74M (stock folded): 700 mm (27.6 in)
- Barrel length: 415 mm (16.3 in)
- Width: AK-74M: 70 mm (2.8 in)
- Height: AK-74M: 195 mm (7.7 in)
- Cartridge: 5.45×39mm
- Action: Gas-operated, long-stroke piston, closed rotating bolt
- Rate of fire: Cyclic: 650 rounds/min; Practical: 100 rounds/min
- Muzzle velocity: 880–900 m/s (2,887–2,953 ft/s)
- Effective firing range: 500 m (550 yd) (AK-74, AKS-74, AK-74M point target); 800 m (870 yd) (AK-74, AKS-74, AK-74M area target)
- Maximum firing range: 3,150 m (3,440 yd)
- Feed system: 30-round AK-74 and 45-round RPK-74 detachable box magazine, 60-round casket magazine and 96-round RPK-16 drum magazines
- Sights: Adjustable iron sights, front post and rear notch on a scaled tangent

The AK-74 (Russian: Автомат Калашникова образца 1974 года, romanized: Avtomat Kalashnikova obraztsa 1974 goda, lit. 'Kalashnikov assault rifle model 1974') is an assault rifle designed by small arms designer Mikhail Kalashnikov in 1974 as a successor to the AKM. It is chambered for the 5.45×39mm cartridge, which replaced the 7.62×39mm cartridge of Kalashnikov's earlier automatic weapons for the Soviet Armed Forces.

The rifle first saw service with Soviet forces in the Soviet–Afghan War from 1979. The head of the Afghan bureau of the Inter-Services Intelligence (ISI), the intelligence agency of Pakistan, claimed that the American Central Intelligence Agency (CIA) paid $5,000 for the first AK-74 captured by the Afghan mujahideen during the war.

As of 2026, most countries of the former Soviet Union use the rifle. Licensed copies were produced in Bulgaria (AK-74, AKS-74 and AKS-74U), and in the former East Germany (MPi-AK-74N, MPi-AKS-74N, MPi-AKS-74NK).

== Design details ==
The AK-74 was designed by А. D. Kryakushin's group under the design supervision of Mikhail Kalashnikov. It is an adaptation of the 7.62×39mm AKM assault rifle and features several important design improvements. These improvements were primarily the result of converting the rifle to the intermediate-calibre high velocity 5.45×39mm cartridge. In fact, some early models are reported to have been converted AKMs, re-barreled to 5.45×39mm. Compared with the preceding AKM, the AK-74 has better effective firing range, accuracy (a main development goal), and reliability. About 50% of the parts in the AK-74 and AKM are the same (including pins, springs and screws).

=== Operating mechanism ===
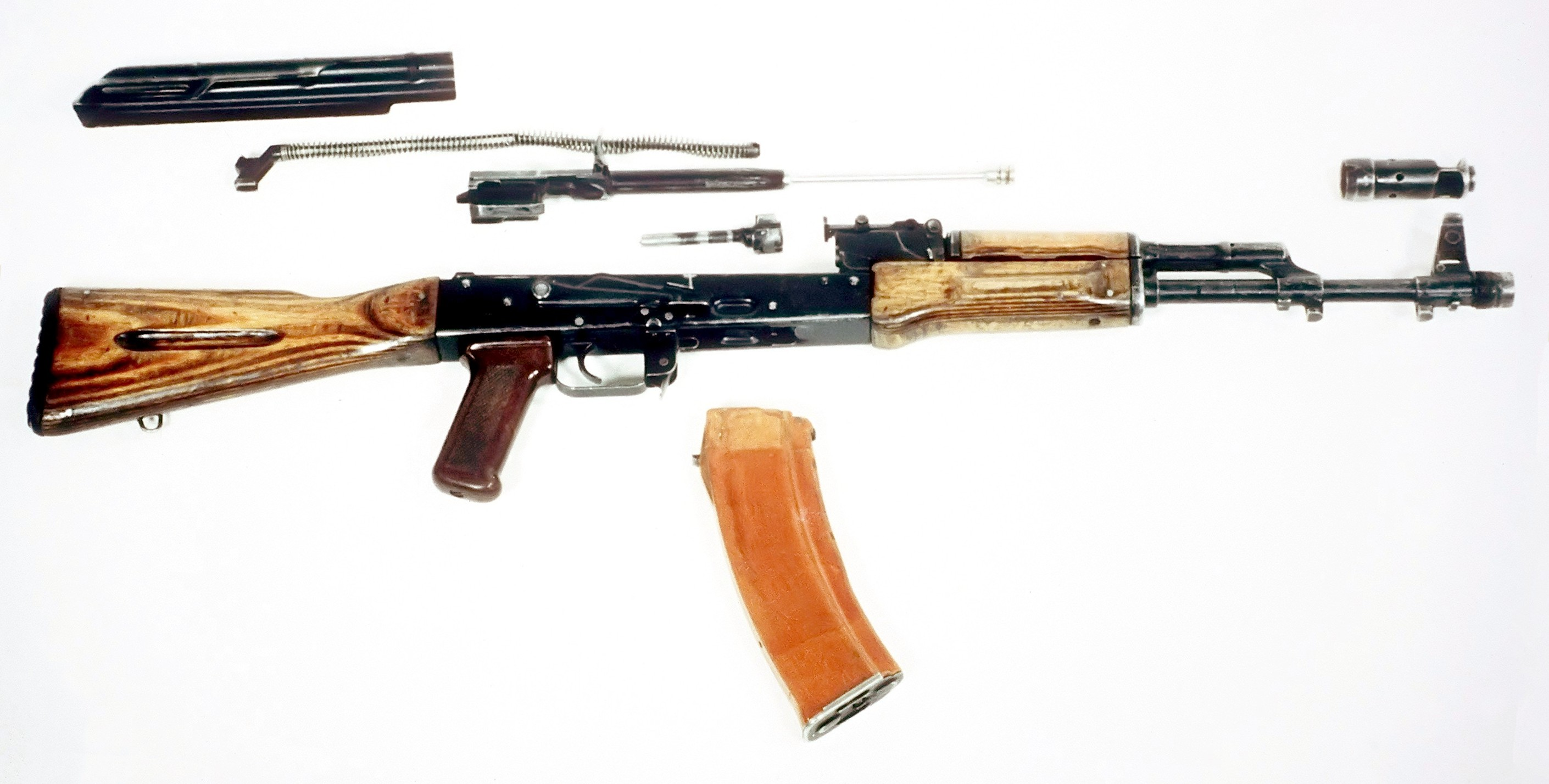
The AK-74 stripped down to its major components

The rifle's operation during firing and reloading is identical to that of the AKM. After ignition of the cartridge primer and propellant, rapidly expanding propellant gases are diverted into the gas cylinder above the barrel through a vent near the muzzle. The build-up of gases inside the gas cylinder drives the long-stroke piston and bolt carrier rearward and a cam guide machined into the underside of the bolt carrier along with an ejector spur on the bolt carrier rail guide, rotates the bolt approximately 35° and unlocks it from the barrel extension via a camming pin on the bolt. The moving assembly has about 5.5 mm (0.2 in) of free travel, which creates a delay between the initial recoil impulse of the piston and the bolt unlocking sequence, allowing gas pressures to drop to a safe level before the seal between the chamber and the bolt is broken. Like previous Kalashnikov-pattern rifles, the AK-74 does not have a gas valve; excess gases are ventilated through a series of radial ports in the gas cylinder. Since the Kalashnikov operating system offers no primary extraction upon bolt rotation, the 5.45×39mm AK-74 bolt has a larger extractor claw than the 7.62×39mm AKM for increased extraction reliability. Other minor modifications were made to the bolt and carrier assembly.

=== Barrel ===
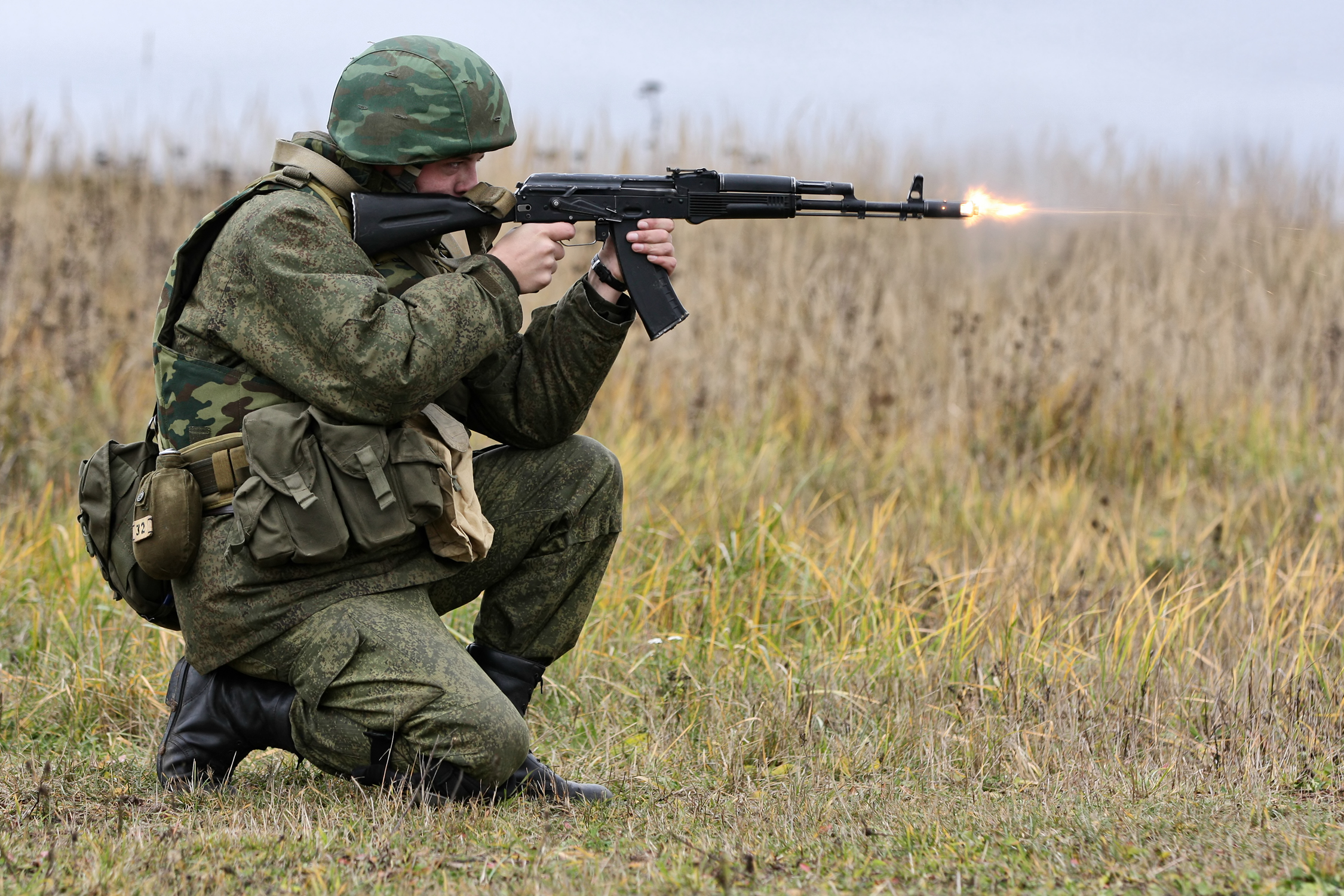
An AK-74M muzzle device venting propellant gases

The rifle received a new barrel with a chrome-lined bore and four right-hand grooves at a 200 mm (1:7.87 in) or 37 calibers rifling twist rate. The front sight base and gas block were redesigned. The gas block contains a gas channel that is installed at a 90° angle in relation to the bore axis to reduce bullet shear at the port hole. A pair of support brackets are cast into the gas block assembly and are used to attach a BG-15c or GP-25 underslung 40 mm grenade launcher. Like the AK-47 and AKM, the muzzle is threaded for the installation of various muzzle devices such as the standard muzzle brake or a blank-firing adaptor, while a spring-loaded detent pin held in the front sight post prevents them from unscrewing while firing. However, the muzzle threads have been relocated to the front sight base for both easier and more economic replacement in case of thread damage. The distinctive standard-issue muzzle brake features a large expansion chamber, two symmetrical vertical cuts at the forward end of the brake and three non symmetrical positioned vent holes to counteract muzzle rise and climb as well as lateral shift to the right much like the AKM's offset muzzle brake. A flat plate near the end of the brake produces a forward thrust when emerging exhaust gases strike its surface, greatly reducing recoil. The muzzle brake prevents backblast from reaching the firer, although it is reported to be harsh on bystanders as the muzzle gases are dispersed to the sides. The standard-issue AK-74 muzzle brake has been subtly revised several times since the 1970s.

=== Sights ===
==== Iron sights ====
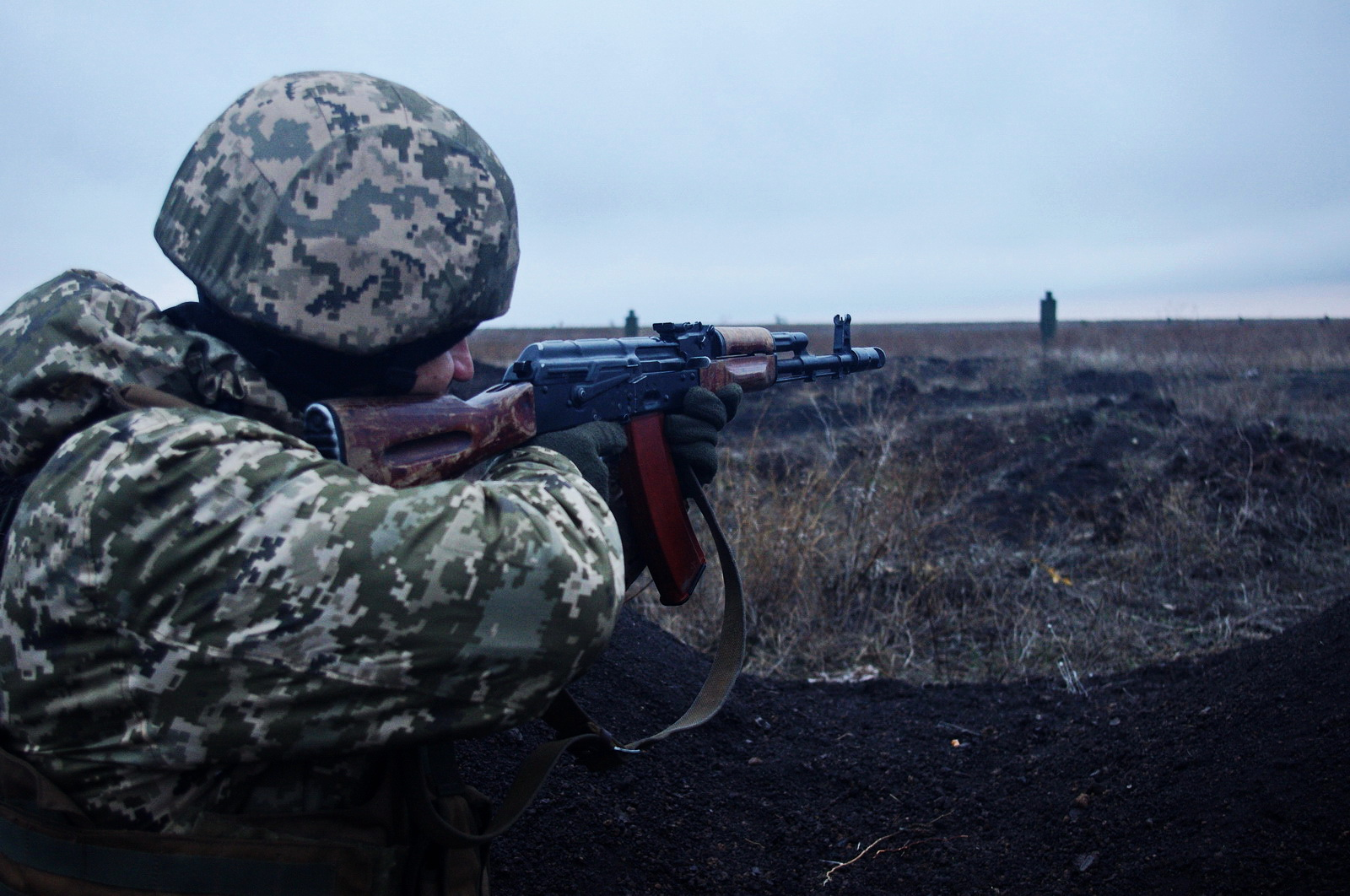
A Ukrainian soldier aiming an AK-74 during an exercise

The AK-74 uses an adjustable notched rear tangent iron sight calibrated in 100 m (109 yd) increments from 100 to 1,000 m (109 to 1,094 yd). The front sight is a post adjustable for elevation in the field. Horizontal adjustment requires a special drift tool and is done by the armoury before issue or if the need arises by an armourer after issue. The sight line elements are approximately 48.5 mm (1.9 in) over the bore axis. The "point-blank range" battle zero setting "П" standing for постоянная (constant/consistent/permanent) the 5.45×39mm AK-74 rear tangent sight element corresponds to a 400 m (437 yd) zero, compared with the 300 m (328 yd) zero for 7.62×39mm AKs. For the AK-74 combined with the 7N6 or 7N10 service cartridges, the 400 m battle zero setting point-blank range limits the apparent "bullet rise" within approximately −5 to +38 cm (−2.0 to 15.0 in) under the line of sight. At the corresponding 440 m (481 yd) maximum point-blank range, the bullet will have dropped to approximately −21 cm (−8.3 in) relative to the line of sight. Soldiers are instructed to fire at any target within this range by simply placing the sights on the center of mass (the belt buckle, according to Russian and former Soviet doctrine) of the enemy target. Any errors in range estimation are tactically irrelevant, as a well-aimed shot will hit the torso of the enemy soldier.

==== Optical sights ====
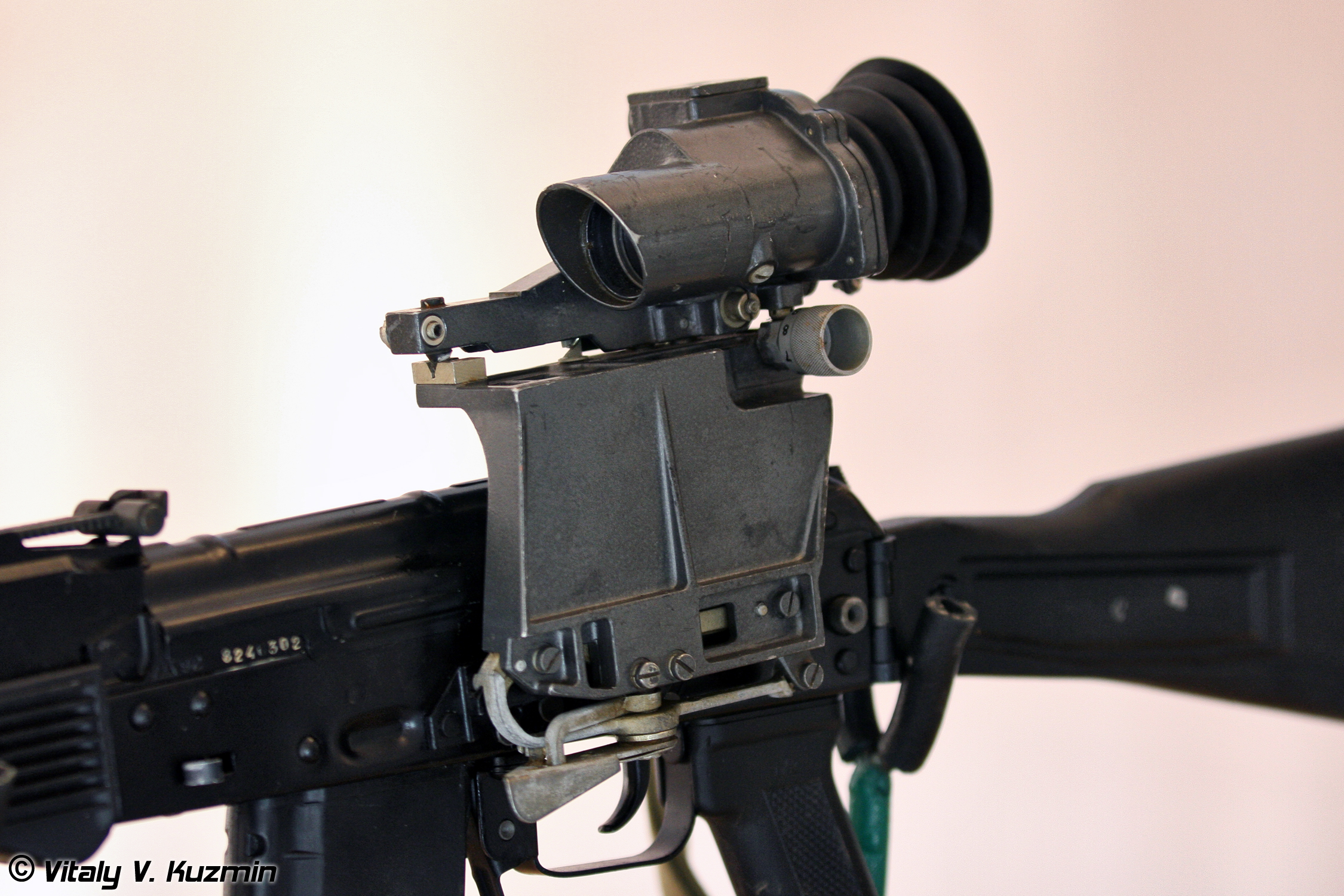
USP-1 (1P29) Universal sight for the AK-74 and other small arms

While most Russian and CIS armed forces use the AK-74 in its basic configuration with iron sights, many magnified and non-magnified optical sights are available for designated marksmen and other special purpose troops in their respective militaries.

For the 5.45×39mm AK-74, the East German Zeiss ZFK 4×25, USP-1 (1P29), Belorussian BelOMO PO 3.5×21P, PO 4×24P, 1P78 Kashtan and the newest 1P87 Valdai dedicated side rail mounted optical sights were developed. These optical sights are primarily designed for rapid target acquisition and first round hits out to 400 m, but by various means these optical sights also offer bullet drop compensation (BDC) (sometimes referred to as ballistic elevation) for aiming at more distant targets. The BDC feature compensates for the effect of gravity on the bullet at given distances (referred to as "bullet drop") in flat fire scenarios. The feature must be tuned for the particular ballistic trajectory of a particular combination of gun and cartridge at a predefined muzzle velocity and air density. Since the usage of standardized ammunition is an important prerequisite to match the BDC feature to the external ballistic behaviour of the employed projectiles, these military optical sights are intended to assist with field shooting at varying medium to longer ranges rather than precise long range shots.

The standard Russian side rail mounted optical sight was the 4×26 1P29 Universal sight for small arms. It was copied from and hence similar to the British SUIT (Sight Unit Infantry, Trilux). When mounted the 1P29 sight is positioned centered above the receiver at a height that allows the use of the iron sights. It weighs 0.8 kg, offers 4× magnification with a field of view of 8° and 35 mm eye relief. The 1P29 is issued with a canvas pouch, a lens cleaning cloth, combination tool, two rubber eyecups, two eyecup clamps and three different bullet drop compensation (BDC) cams for the AK-74/AN-94, RPK-74 and PK machine gun. The 1P29 is intended for quickly engaging point and area targets at various ranges and is zeroed for both windage and elevation at 400 m (437 yd). On the right side of the field of view, a stadiametric rangefinder is incorporated that can be used to determine the distance from a 1.5 meters (4 ft 11.1 in) tall object from 400 to 1,200 m (437 to 1,312 yd). The reticle is an inverted aiming post in the top half of the field of view and is tritium-illuminated for low-light condition aiming.

The current Russian standard side rail mounted optical sight for the AK-74M is the 2.8×17 1P78 Kashtan, an aiming optic similar to the American ACOG. When mounted, the 1P78 sight is positioned centered above the receiver. It weighs 0.5 kg, offers 2.8× magnification with a field of view of 13° and 32 mm eye relief. The 1P78 comes in several versions for the AK-74 (1P78-1), RPK-74 (1P78-2), AKM (1P78) and RPK (1P78-3). The 1P78 is intended for quickly engaging point and area targets at various ranges and is zeroed for both windage and elevation at 400 m (437 yd). A stadiametric rangefinder is incorporated that can be used to determine the distance for a soldier sized target from 400 to 700 m (437 to 766 yd). The reticle consist of a main 400 m "chevron" (^), a 500 m (547 yd) holdover dot and smaller additional holdover chevrons for 600 m (656 yd) and 700 m (766 yd) and is tritium-illuminated for low-light condition aiming.

=== New features ===
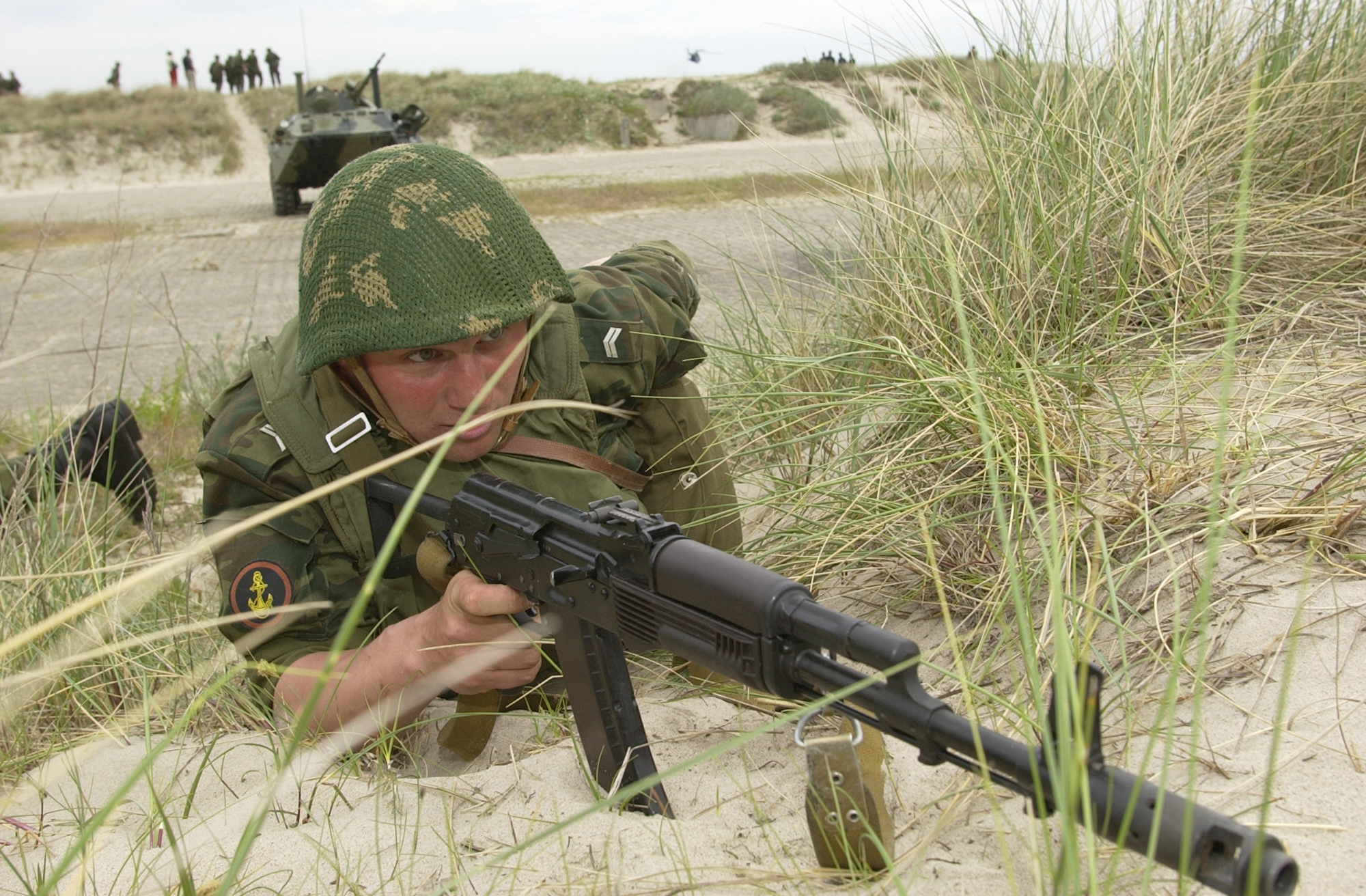
A Russian marine on exercise with the AKS-74 variant featuring plum-colored polymer furniture

The AK-74 was equipped with a new buttstock, handguard (which retained the AKM-type finger swells) and gas cylinder. The stock has a shoulder pad different from that on the AKM, which is rubber and serrated for improved seating against the shooter. In addition, there are lightening cuts on each side of the buttstock. The buttstock, lower handguard and upper heatguard were first manufactured from laminated wood, this later changed to a synthetic fiberglass-reinforced polyamide 6 colored with "kaprozol brown 4K" disperse dye, the color of which is usually referred to as "Russian Plum". The introduction of the new material was slow and impeded by very stringent hardness requirements of the military, which no Western polymer furniture was able to satisfy as of 1980.

The AK-74 gas tube has a spring washer attached to its rear end designed to retain the gas tube more securely. The lower handguard is fitted with a leaf spring that reduces play in the rifle's lateral axis by keeping the wood tensioned between the receiver and the handguard retainer. The receiver remains nearly identical to that of the AKM; it is a U-shaped 1 mm (0.04 in) thick sheet steel pressing supported extensively by pins and rivets. The internal guide rails on which the bolt carrier travels are stamped and spot welded to the inside of the receiver housing. Minor changes were made to the front barrel and rear stock trunnions as well as the magazine well. All external metal surfaces are coated with a glossy black enamel paint.

=== 5.45×39mm cartridge ===
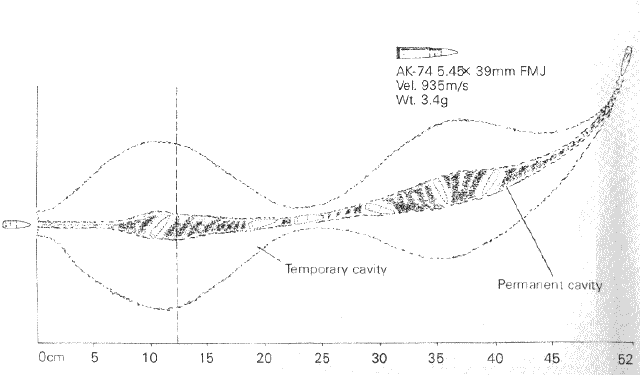
AK-74 5.45×39mm wound ballistics

Relatively small sized, light weight, high velocity military service cartridges like the 5.45×39mm allow a soldier to carry more ammunition for the same weight compared with their larger and heavier predecessor cartridges, have favourable maximum point-blank range or "battle zero" characteristics and produce relatively low bolt thrust and free recoil impulse, favouring light weight arms design and automatic fire accuracy. Tests measured the free recoil energy delivered by the 5.45×39mm AK-74 rifle at 3.39 J (2.50 ft⋅lb), compared with 7.19 J (5.30 ft⋅lb) delivered by the 7.62×39mm in the AKM.

Early 5.45×39mm ballistics tests demonstrated a pronounced tumbling effect with high speed cameras. Some Western authorities believed this bullet was designed to tumble in flesh to increase wounding potential. At the time, it was believed that yawing and cavitation of projectiles were primarily responsible for tissue damage. Martin Fackler conducted a study with an AK-74 assault rifle using live pigs and ballistic gelatin; "The result of our preset test indicate that the AK-74 bullet acts in the manner expected of a full-metal-cased military ammunition – it does not deform or fragment when striking soft tissues". Most organs and tissue were too flexible to be severely damaged by the temporary cavity effect caused by yaw and cavitation of a projectile. With the 5.45 mm bullet, tumbling produced a temporary cavity twice, at depths of 100 mm (3.9 in) and 350 mm (13.8 in). This is similar to (but more rapid than) modern 7.62×39mm ammunition and to (non-fragmenting) 5.56×45mm NATO ammunition.

=== Magazines ===
The original steel-reinforced 30-round AK-74 detachable box magazine was similar to that of the AKM, except for minor dimensional changes required by the 5.45×39mm cartridge. These magazines discolour over time from yellowish to rust-coloured shades, and are often mistakenly identified as being made of Bakelite (a phenolic resin), but were actually fabricated from two-parts of AG-4S molding compound (a glass-reinforced phenol-formaldehyde binder impregnated composite), assembled using an epoxy resin adhesive. Noted for their durability, these magazines did however compromise the rifle's camouflage and lacked the small horizontal reinforcing ribs running down both sides of the magazine body near the front that were added on all later AK-74 magazine generations.

A second generation steel-reinforced dark-brown (color shades vary from maroon to plum to near black) 30-round magazine was introduced in the early 1980s, fabricated from ABS plastic. The third generation steel-reinforced 30-round AK-74 magazine is similar to the second generation, but is darker colored and has a matte nonreflective surface finish. With the introduction of the AK-74M the fourth generation of steel-reinforced matte true black nonreflective surface finished 30-round AK-74 magazines was introduced. All AK-74 magazines have a raised horizontal rib on each side of the rear lug to prevent their use in a 7.62×39mm AK. The magazines can be quickly recharged from stripper clips. The empty weight of a 30-round AK-74 box magazine is 230 g (8.1 oz). The 45-round plastic box magazine of the RPK-74 light machine gun is also interchangeable with that of the AK-74. The empty weight of a 45-round RPK-74 box magazine is 300 g (11 oz). Further 60-round and later 50-round quad-stack 5.45×39mm casket magazines were developed.

The transition to mainly plastic magazines and the relatively small sized, light weight, high velocity 5.45×39mm cartridge yielded a significant weight reduction and allows a soldier to carry considerably more rounds for the same weight compared with the previous Soviet AK-47 and AKM and later 7.62×39mm chambered AK platform assault rifles.

Rifle	Cartridge	Cartridge weight	Weight of empty magazine	Weight of loaded magazine	Max. 10.12 kg (22.3 lb) ammunition load*
AK-47 (1949)	7.62×39mm	16.3 g (252 gr)	slab-sided steel 430 g (0.95 lb)	30-rounds 916 g (2.019 lb)	11 magazines for 330 rounds 10.08 kg (22.2 lb)
AKM (1959)	7.62×39mm	16.3 g (252 gr)	ribbed stamped-steel 330 g (0.73 lb)	30-rounds 819 g (1.806 lb)	12 magazines for 360 rounds 9.83 kg (21.7 lb)
AK-103 (1994)	7.62×39mm	16.3 g (252 gr)	steel-reinforced plastic 250 g (0.55 lb)	30-rounds 739 g (1.629 lb)	13 magazines for 390 rounds 9.61 kg (21.2 lb)
AK-74 (1974)	5.45×39mm	10.7 g (165 gr)	steel-reinforced plastic 230 g (0.51 lb)	30-rounds 551 g (1.215 lb)	18 magazines for 540 rounds 9.92 kg (21.9 lb)

Note: All, 7.62×39mm AK magazines are backwards compatible with older AK variants.
Note *: 10.12 kg (22.3 lb) is the maximum amount of ammo that the average soldier can comfortably carry. It also allows for best comparison of the three most common 7.62×39mm AK platform magazines and the 5.45×39mm AK-74 magazine.

=== Accessories ===
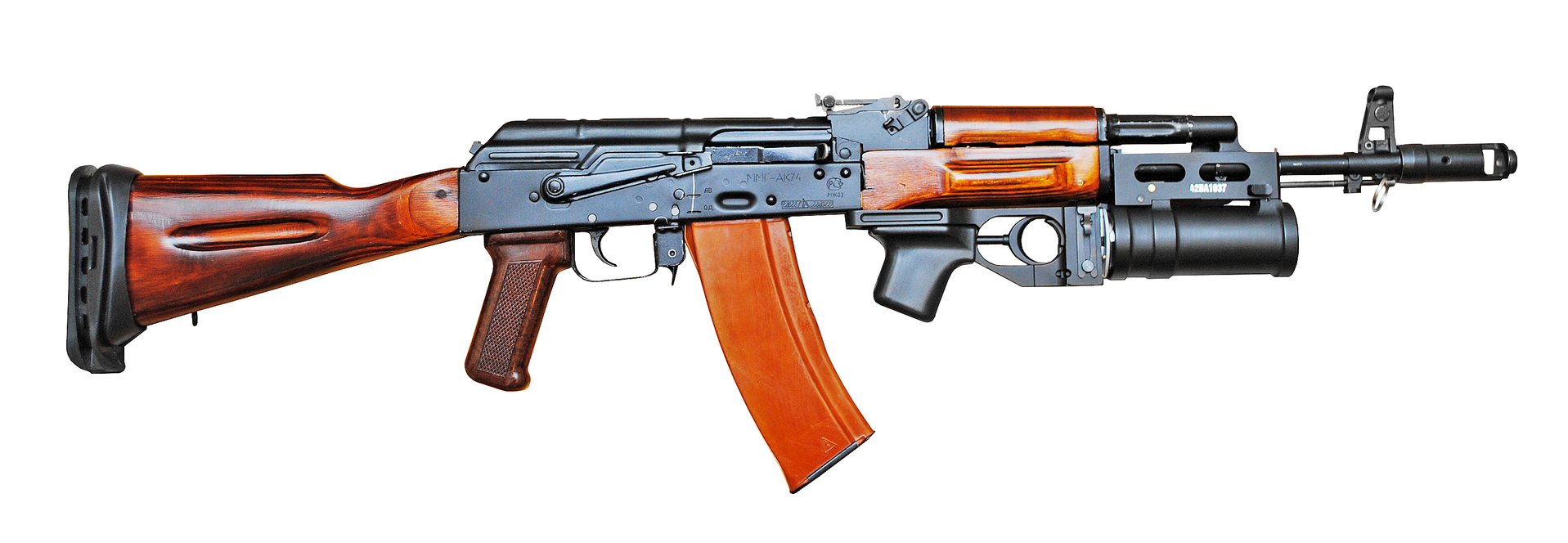
A non-functional model of the АК-74 assault rifle fitted with an airsoft replica of the GP-25 grenade launcher (the launcher is made by the Chinese company Double Bell). Notice the added recoil-reducing shoulder pad.

Accessories supplied with the military version of the rifle include a 6H4 or 6H5 type bayonet, a quick-loading device, three spare magazines, four 15-round stripper clips, maintenance kit, cleaning rod and sling.

The bayonet is installed by slipping the muzzle ring around the flash hider and latching the handle down on the bayonet lug under the front sight base. The 6H5 AK-74 bayonet introduced in 1983 represents a further refinement of the 6H4 AKM bayonet. It introduced a radical blade cross-section, that has a flat milled on one side near the edge and a corresponding flat milled on the opposite side near the false edge. The blade has a new spear point and an improved one-piece molded plastic grip making it a more effective fighting knife. It also has saw-teeth on the false edge and the usual hole for use as a wire-cutter.

== Variants ==
The AK-74 series is also available in several "night-fighting" configurations, equipped with a side dovetail rail for mounting optical sights. These variants, the AK-74N, AKS-74N and AKS-74UN can be used in conjunction with NSPU and NSPU-3 (1PN51) night sights, as well as optical sights such as the USP-1 (1P29). The variants designated AK-74N2 and AKS-74N2 can use the multi-model night vision sight NSPUM (1PN58).

=== AKS-74 ===
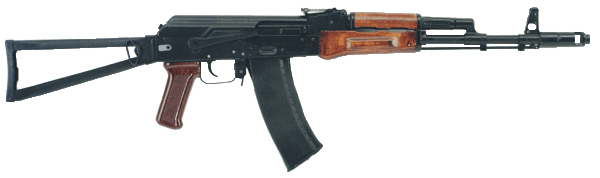
The AKS-74. Designed for airborne infantry and equipped with a folding shoulder stock

The AKS-74 ("S"—Russian: складной; Skladnoy, or "foldable"), is a variant of the AK-74 equipped with a side-folding metal shoulder stock, designed primarily for use with air assault infantry and developed alongside the basic AK-74. Unlike the AKMS's somewhat fragile underfolding stock (modeled after the MP 40 submachine gun stock), the AKS-74 stock is fabricated from stamped sheet metal struts, machine pressed into a "U" shape and assembled by punch fit and welding.

The stock has a triangular shape; it lacks the folding shoulder pad found on the AKMS stock and is folded to the left side of the receiver. The hinged stock is securely locked in its extended position by a spring-loaded button catch located at the rear of the receiver. When folded, the stock is held closed by a spring-loaded capture hook situated on the left side at the front of the receiver housing. A rear-mounted sling swivel is also provided on the right side at the beginning of the stock frame. It retains the pistol grip reinforcement plate the AKMS used, though due to the less complex rear trunnion, only has one riveting hole in place of the three on the AKMS.

=== AK-74M ===
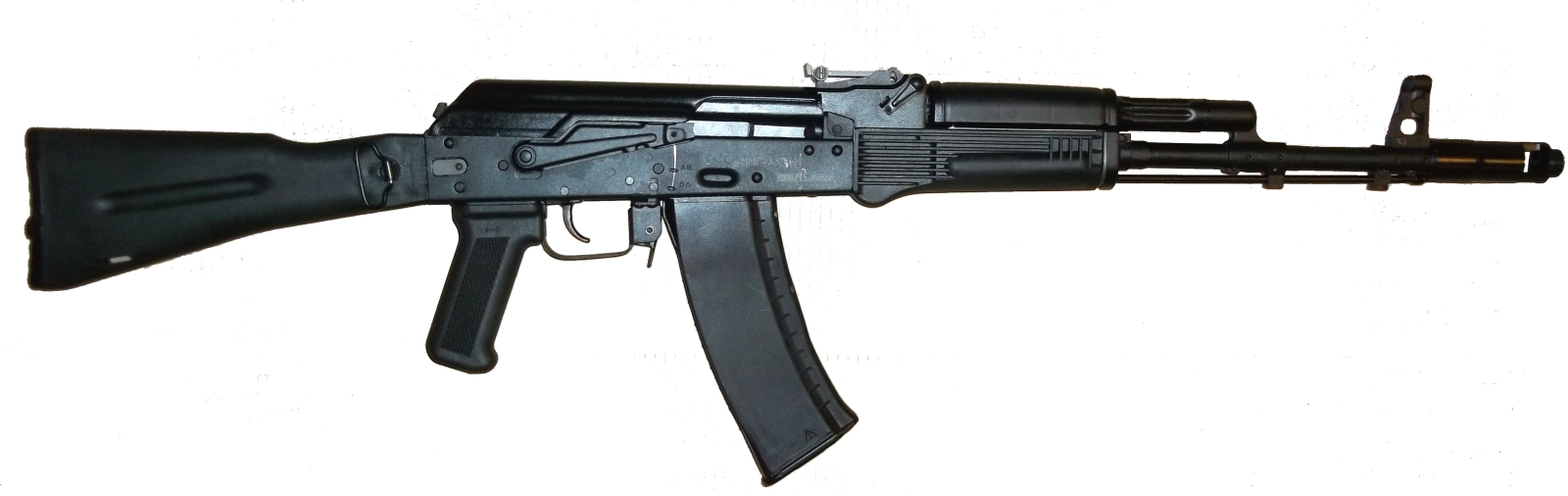
The AK-74M

In 1991, the Izhmash factory in the city of Izhevsk began full-scale production of a modernised variant of the AK-74—the AK-74M ("М"—Russian: Модернизи́рованный, romanized: Modernizírovanny, lit. 'modernised') assault rifle that offers more versatility compared with its predecessor. Apart from several minor improvements, such as a lightened bolt and carrier assembly to reduce the impulse of the gas piston and bolt carrier during firing, the rifle features a new glass-filled polyamide stock that retains the shape of the original AK-74 fixed laminated wood stock, but side-folds to the left like the skeletonised AKS-74 buttstock. As a result, pistol grip reinforcement plates that were once exclusively used on the folding stock variants are standard on all AK-74Ms. Additionally the AK-74M features an improved muzzle device with extended collar and threads to reduce play and a machine cut beneath to allow easier cleaning rod removal, a reinforced smooth dust cover and a redesigned guide rod return spring retainer that allows firing the GP-25, GP-30 and GP-34 underslung grenade launchers without having to use the previously necessary additional receiver cover fastener. To reduce production costs, barrel hardware, such as the front sight base and gas block, are dimple pressed on to the barrel instead of pinned on (commercial semi-auto variants are still pinned on to maintain user serviceability).

Other economic changes include omission of lightening cuts on the front sight block and gas piston as well as a stamped gas tube release lever, replacing the milled one. The bullet guide and bolt guide were also separated, with the bolt guide becoming a simple bump held in place on the left side of the receiver with an additional rivet (often called a "bump rivet" because of this) making it easier to replace in case of wear. Each AK-74M is fitted with a side-rail bracket for mounting optics that is a simplified version of the 74N mount with less machining cuts. The AK-74M would have been adopted by the Soviet Union as the standard service rifle, and has been accepted as the new service rifle of the Russian Federation.

==== AK-74M Obves - UUK (Universal Upgrade Kit) ====
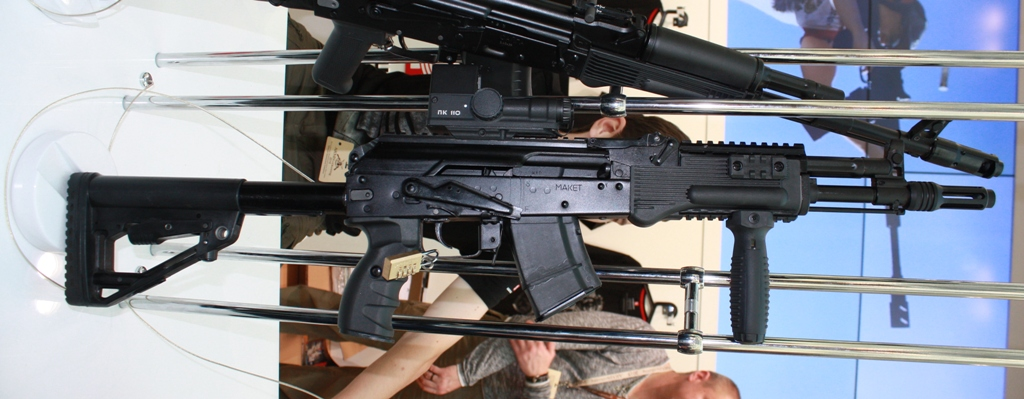
Upgrade set Обвес for the AK-74M and AK-100 rifle family

An AK-74M universal upgrade kit consisting of a new safety, dust cover and furniture featuring improved ergonomics and rails to attach accessories like aiming optics, optoelectronic sights, laser sights, weapon lights and vertical fore grips and a new muzzle device had its official debut on 9 May 2015 in Moscow as part of the 2015 Moscow Victory Day Parade. The Kalashnikov Concern has further developed three sets of additional equipment for the modernization of 5.45×39mm and 7.62×39mm chambered AK-pattern assault rifles for normal military units, reconnaissance units, and special forces units.

In 2015, the Kalashnikov Concern announced a contract with the Russian Ministry of Defence to deliver upgrade kits for their AK-74M assault rifles.

=== AKS-74U ===
In 1973, a design competition (codenamed "Modern"—Модерн) was started for the adoption of a fully automatic carbine.

Soviet planners drew from the unsolicited design AO-46 built in 1969 by Peter Andreevich Tkachev, which weighed only 1.9 kg. The TTT specifications required a weight no greater than 2.2 kg (4.9 lb), a length of 75 cm (29.5 in)/45 cm (17.7 in) with the stock unfolded/folded, and an effective firing range of 500 m (547 yd). The competition was joined by designs of Mikhail Kalashnikov (PP1), Igor Stechkin (TKB-0116), S. G. Simonov (AG-043), A. S. Konstantinov (AEK-958), and Yevgeny Dragunov (who called his model "MA"). Kalashnikov also presented an additional design (A1-75), which differed from PP1 by having a modified muzzle for flash and noise suppression.

In 1977, the GRAU decided to adopt Kalashnikov's model, which was largely a shortened AKS-74, because its performance was no worse than the competition, and promised significant production cost savings by utilizing existing equipment for the AK-74 line. A final round of large scale testing with Kalashnikov's model was performed by airborne divisions in the Transcaucasian Military District in March 1977. The AKS-74U ("U"—Russian: укороченный; Ukorochenniy, or "shortened") was officially adopted in 1979, and given the official, but seldom used GRAU designation 6P26. Production stopped in 1993.

The AKS-74U bridges the tactical deployment gap between a submachine gun and an assault rifle. It was intended for use mainly with special forces, airborne infantry, rear-echelon support units, helicopter and armored vehicle crews. It has been augmented and replaced by various submachine guns, and the less compact AK-105 carbine in Russian military service. It is commonly used by law enforcement; for example, each urban police foot patrol is issued at least one.

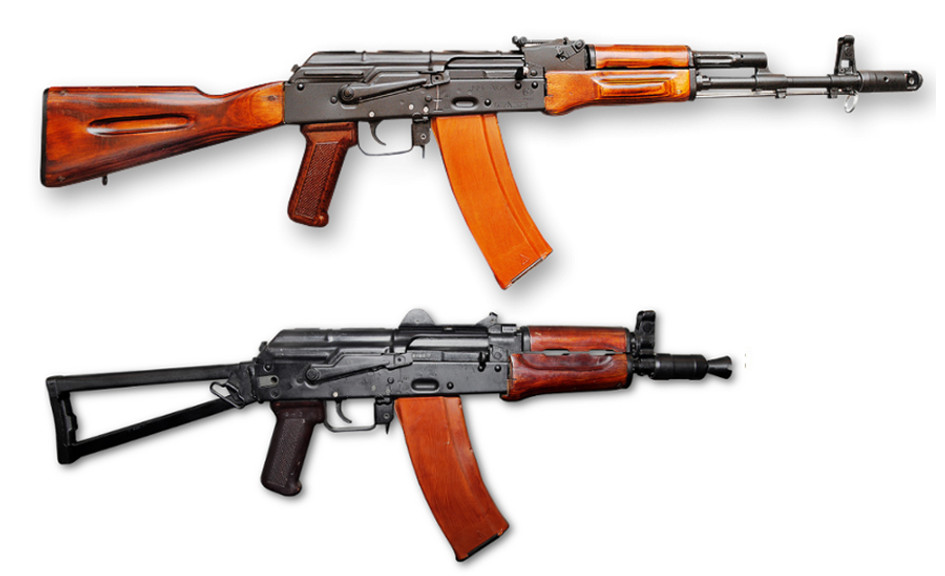
AK-74 (top) and AKS-74U

The AKS-74U's compact dimensions were achieved by using a short 206.5 mm (8.1 in) barrel (this forced designers to simultaneously reduce the gas piston operating rod to an appropriate length). Due to the shortening of the operating mechanism, the cyclic rate rose slightly to around 700 rounds per minute. In order to effectively stabilize projectiles, the barrel's twist rate was increased from 200 mm (1:7.87 in) or 37 calibers rifling twist rate to 160 mm (1:6.3 in) or 29.6 calibers rifling twist rate to adapt the AKS-74U for muzzle velocities of 720 m/s (2,362 ft/s) and higher. A new gas block was installed at the muzzle end of the barrel with a muzzle booster, which features an internal expansion chamber inside the cylindrical section of the booster while the conical end acts as a nozzle to increase net pressure inside the gas chamber by supplying an increased amount of propellant gases from the barrel. The chrome-lined muzzle booster also burns any remaining propellant, which would normally reduce muzzle blast. However, due to the extremely short barrel and conical end of the booster, the muzzle blast is nevertheless extremely large and visible. The muzzle device locks into the gas block with a spring-loaded detent pin and features two parallel notches cut into the edge of the flash hider cone, used for unscrewing it using the cleaning rod. Unlike most Kalashnikov variants, there is no provision to store the cleaning rod under the barrel. The front sight was integrated into the gas block/forward sling loop.

The sight height above the bore axis is also approximately 3 mm (0.1 in) higher than the AK-74, due to the combined front sight/gas block, rear sight configuration. The AKS-74U has a different rear sight composed of a U-shaped flip sight on the top cover instead of the standard sliding notch tangent rear sight. This rear sight has two settings: "П" standing for постоянная (constant) corresponding to a 350 m (383 yd) "point-blank range" battle zero setting and "4-5" (used for firing at distances between 400–500 m (437–547 yd)). The rear sight is housed in a semi-shrouded protective enclosure that is riveted to the receiver's spring-loaded top cover. This top cover hinges from a barrel trunnion (hinging where the rear sight on a normal AK74 is located), pivoting forward when opened, which also works to unlock the gas tube cover. Both the gas tube and handguard are also of a new type and are wider and shorter than the analogous parts in the AKS-74.

For the AKS-74s combined with the 7N6 or 7N10 service cartridges, the 350 m battle zero setting limits the apparent "bullet rise" within approximately −5 to +42 cm (−2.0 to 16.5 in) relative to the line of sight. Soldiers are instructed to fire at any target within this range by simply placing the sights on the center of mass (the belt buckle) of the enemy target. Any errors in range estimation are tactically irrelevant, as a well-aimed shot will hit the torso of the enemy soldier.

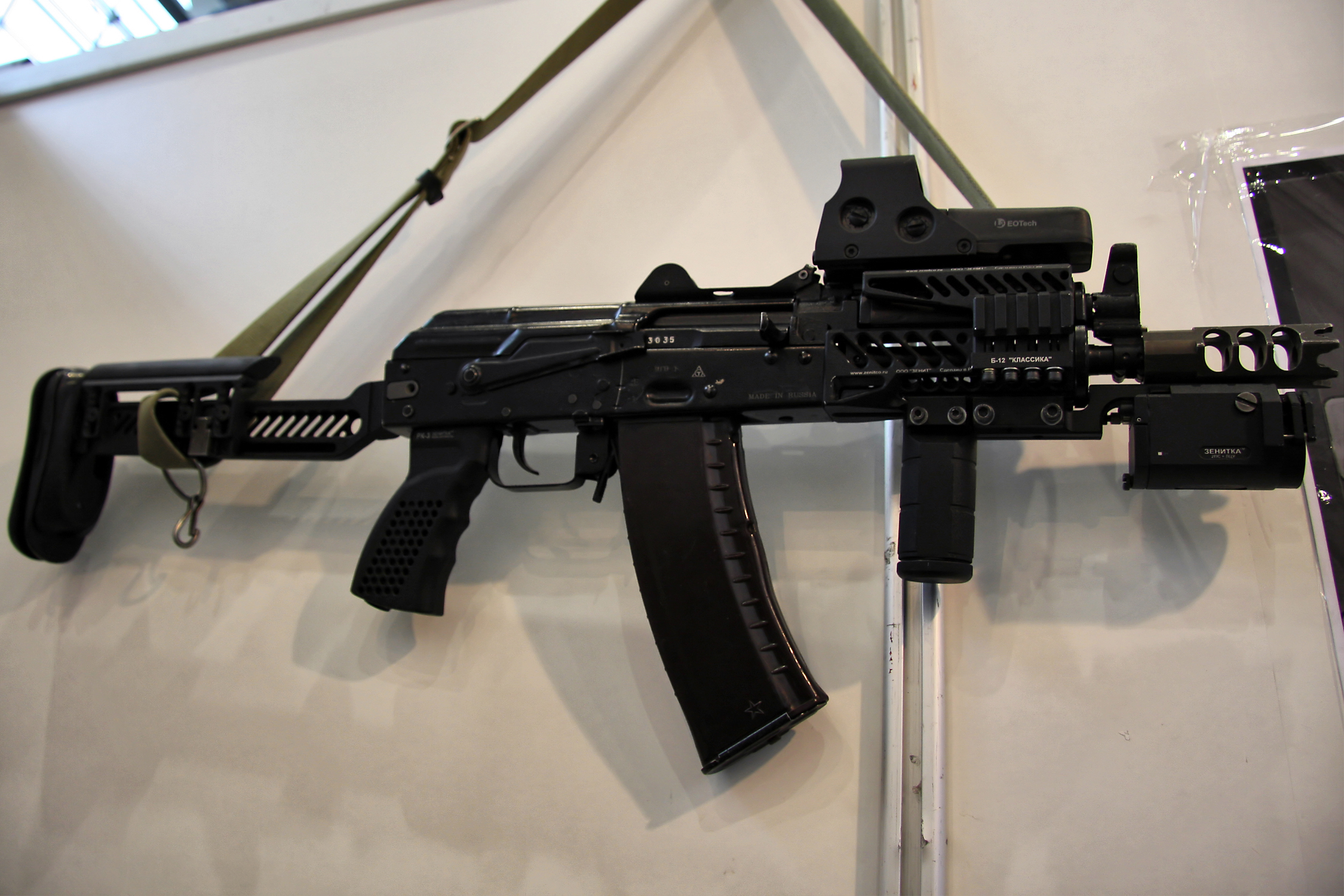
An AKS-74U with various Zenitco accessories installed

The AKS-74U is significantly more maneuverable in tight quarters than the AKS-74; however, the significant decline in muzzle velocity to 735 m/s (2,411 ft/s) resulted in a 100 m (109 yd) reduction in effective range to 400 m (437 yd) (the effective hitting distance for a "running"-type silhouette target was reduced from 625 m (684 yd) to 360 m (394 yd)). The AKS-74U cannot mount a bayonet or standard under-barrel grenade launcher. However, a suppressed 30 mm BS-1 grenade launcher was developed specifically for that platform that fires a high-explosive dual purpose (HEDP) grenade. The grenades for the BS-1 are launched by special blank cartridges that are inserted into the grenade launcher via a detachable magazine. The majority of AKS-74U carbines were manufactured at the Tula Arms Factory rather than Izhmash. There were some accessories produced for the AKS-74U including a plastic thigh holster and (shorter than standard) 20-round AK-74 type magazines. The rifle utilizes a proprietary 25 mm wide sling that differs from the standard 35 mm AK sling also in construction. The AKS-74U also exists in a version featuring modernized synthetic furniture made from a black, glass-filled polyamide. The AKS-74U was also used as the basis for several other unique weapons, including the bullpup OTs-14 Groza specialist carbine which is now in limited service in the Russian military, and the Gepard series of multi-caliber submachine guns (none of which evolved past prototype stage).

In the United States, the AKS-74U is sometimes called a "Krinkov". The origin of this term is uncertain. A hypothesis was circulating that the name came from the Mujahideen who supposedly had captured a high-ranking Soviet officer armed with an AKS-74U, and that they had named it after him. However, investigation by Patrick Sweeney could not confirm this hypothesis, for no Soviet officer with a resembling name was captured in Afghanistan. US journalist C. J. Chivers reported that the gun was nicknamed "the Osama" in jihadist circles, after Osama bin Laden was photographed next to an AKS-74U. Research by The Firearm Blog published in 2016 suggests that the name "Krinkov" is a Pashtun invention that came to the United States with accounts of the Mujahideen.

The AKS-74U is approximately 3 oz (85 g) lighter than the NATO equivalent XM177, and 10.2 in (260 mm) shorter with the stock folded.

==== AKS-74UB ====
The AKS-74UB ("B"—Russian: бесшумный; Besshumniy or "silent") is a sound-suppressed variant of the AKS-74U adapted for use with the PBS-4 suppressor (used in combination with subsonic 5.45×39mm 7U1 Russian ammunition).

== Foreign production ==
=== Azerbaijan ===
The AK-74M is manufactured under license by the Ministry of Defence Industry of Azerbaijan.

=== Bulgaria ===
Locally produced AK-74, AKS-74 and AKS-74U were used by the Bulgarian Armed Forces. They were phased out in the military in favor of the older AK-47 and AKM rifles, presumably because of the wider availability of 7.62x39mm in Bulgaria.

Some were inherited by the Ministry of Interior but were "banned from police use" in the 90s.

=== Romania ===
The AK-74 is manufactured locally in Romania as the PA md. 86.

=== North Korea ===
The AK-74 is manufactured locally in North Korea as the Type-88. Sources suggest that it was made with technical assistance from China.

=== East Germany ===
In East Germany, the AK-74, AKS-74 and AKS-74U were manufactured locally as the MPi-AK-74N, MPi-AKS-74N, and MPi-AKS-74NK.

== Post-AK-74M developments and successors ==
=== AK-100 series ===
The modernised variant of the AK-74 — the AK-74M — was used as the technical basis for the new Russian AK-100 family of Kalashnikov firearms:

Chambering	Assault rifle	Carbine
5.56×45mm NATO	AK-101	AK-102
7.62×39mm	AK-103	AK-104
5.45×39mm	AK-74M	AK-105
9×39mm	OTs-12 Tiss	AK-9

Even with the differences in the above table all of these firearms are made to similar specifications.

These original AK-100 series firearms were introduced in 1994 and are categorized by all having black polymer handguards, folding polymer stocks, and use of AK-74M internal systems. Parts are highly interchangeable. The AK-101, AK-102, AK-103 and AK-104 were designed primarily for export, while the AK-105 was developed for replacing the shorter barreled AKS-74U. The AK-105 is used by the Russian Army and Ministry of Internal Affairs.

Additionally, the 5.45×39mm AK-107, 5.56×45mm NATO AK-108 and 7.62×39mm AK-109 assault rifles were developed. These have a technically differing balanced recoil system to reduce felt recoil and muzzle rise. This balanced recoil system designed by Yuriy K. Alexandrov for Kalashnikov-pattern rifles is a significant change to the Kalashnikov operating system of the 1940s. The operating system of these new rifles was derived from the AL-7 experimental rifle of the early 1970s. Since their development, these rifles met little commercial success.

==== AK-200 series ====
The AK-100M/AK-200 rifle family was initially conceived around 2009 as an improved variant of the basic AK-100 series. Most improvements centered on ergonomic improvements and mounting systems for accessories. The development of the AK-200 family was stopped around 2011, but resumed around 2016. In 2017, Kalashnikov unveiled the modernised versions of the AK-100 family of rifles. The AK-200 series are based on the AK-100 series and the AK-12. They can be chambered in 5.45×39mm, 5.56×45mm NATO and 7.62×39mm, and use a barrel and gas system assembly similar to that of the AK-74M/AK-100 rifle family. Improvements added from the AK-12 include Picatinny rails, a new pistol grip, a new adjustable buttstock and a new flash hider. They feed from 30-round magazines, and are compatible with drum magazines from the RPK and RPK-74. After 2017, these arms were assigned AK-200 series designations.

Chambering	Assault Rifle	Carbine
5.45×39mm	AK-200	AK-205
5.56×45mm NATO	AK-201	AK-202
7.62×39mm	AK-203	AK-204

As of 2018, the AK-200 series rifles are offered for export sales and for domestic law enforcement users in Russia.

=== AK-12 ===
In 2010, the AK-12 series of proposed prototype models were unveiled. They differed in weight, introduced a new recoil compensation technology and improved ergonomics. The rear iron sight element was rail-mounted and moved to the back of the upper receiver to lengthen the sight line, and the full length of the weapon featured a Picatinny rail for mounting accessories such as aiming optics on top. The hand guard features Picatinny rails on both sides and its underside for mounting accessories like tactical lights, laser sights and grenade launchers. Throughout its development and evaluation stage the multiple modifications were applied to meet Russian military standards, as well as to improve upon the "range of defects" that were discovered on prototype models and to address concerns regarding the cost of earlier prototypes. In September 2016 the prototype models were replaced by the final production models of the AK-12 (chambered in 5.45×39mm) and AK-15 (chambered in 7.62×39mm) assault rifles.

Parallel developments are the RPK-16 light machine gun and the AM-17 compact assault rifle (both chambered in 5.45×39mm). The AK-12, AK-15 and RPK-16 technically strongly resembles the AK-74M, AK-100 series and RPK-74M than the earlier prototypes and the arms manufacturer Kalashnikov concern hopes they will replace these Russian service guns.

In late 2016, it was reported the AK-12 production model was undergoing troop trials with the Russian Army, where it competes against the Degtyarov A-545 balanced action assault rifle in Ratnik program trials. The AK-12 completed its operational testing and passed military field tests in June 2017, paving the way to Russian Army adoption, potentially under the Ratnik program. Both AK-12 and AK-15 completed testing in December 2017. In January 2018 it was announced that the AK-12 and AK-15 have been adopted by the Russian military.

== Users ==
A map with AK-74 users in blue and former users in red

- (Islamic Republic of Afghanistan) / Afghanistan Nicknamed the "Kalakov".
- Angola
- Armenia: AK-74 used by Armed Forces of Armenia. To be replaced by AK-12 & AK-15.
- Azerbaijan: AK-74M manufactured under license by the Ministry of Defence Industry of Azerbaijan.
- Belarus
- Burundi: Used by Burundian rebels.
- Chad
- Cyprus: AK-74M used by the Cypriot National Guard.
- Cuba: Standard issue assault rifle.
- Egypt: AK-74M used by El-Sa'ka Forces.
- Estonia
- Georgia: In use alongside the M4 carbine in service in Georgia. Being phased out by AR-15 platform rifles.
- Greece: AK-74M
- Guatemala: AKS-74U
- Ivory Coast
- Kazakhstan
- Kyrgyzstan
- Laos: Seen during the 50th National Day military parade.
- Latvia
- Lebanon: Used by Police.
- Lesotho
- Libya
- Lithuania: AKS-74 and AK-74M.
- Madagascar
- Moldova
- Mongolia
- Myanmar: Some received from Russia, possibly supplied for trials
- Nigeria
- North Korea: Manufactured locally as the Type 88 assault rifle. Sources suggest that it was made with technical assistance from China. Initially used steel magazines before plastic versions were adopted. Helical-based magazines used for the Type 88 first appeared publicly back in 2014.
- Pakistan
- Romania: Manufactured locally as the PA md. 86.
- Russia: The AK-74M is currently the main service rifle in the Russian Army, and being supplemented by the newer AK-12.
- Rwanda
- Somalia: AK-74 and AK-74M
- Syria: AK-74, AKS-74 and AK-74M
- Tajikistan
- Turkmenistan: AK-74 and AKS-74 used by Turkmenistan Ground Forces. To be replaced by ARX160.
- Ukraine
- Uzbekistan
- Yemen
- Zambia

=== Former users ===
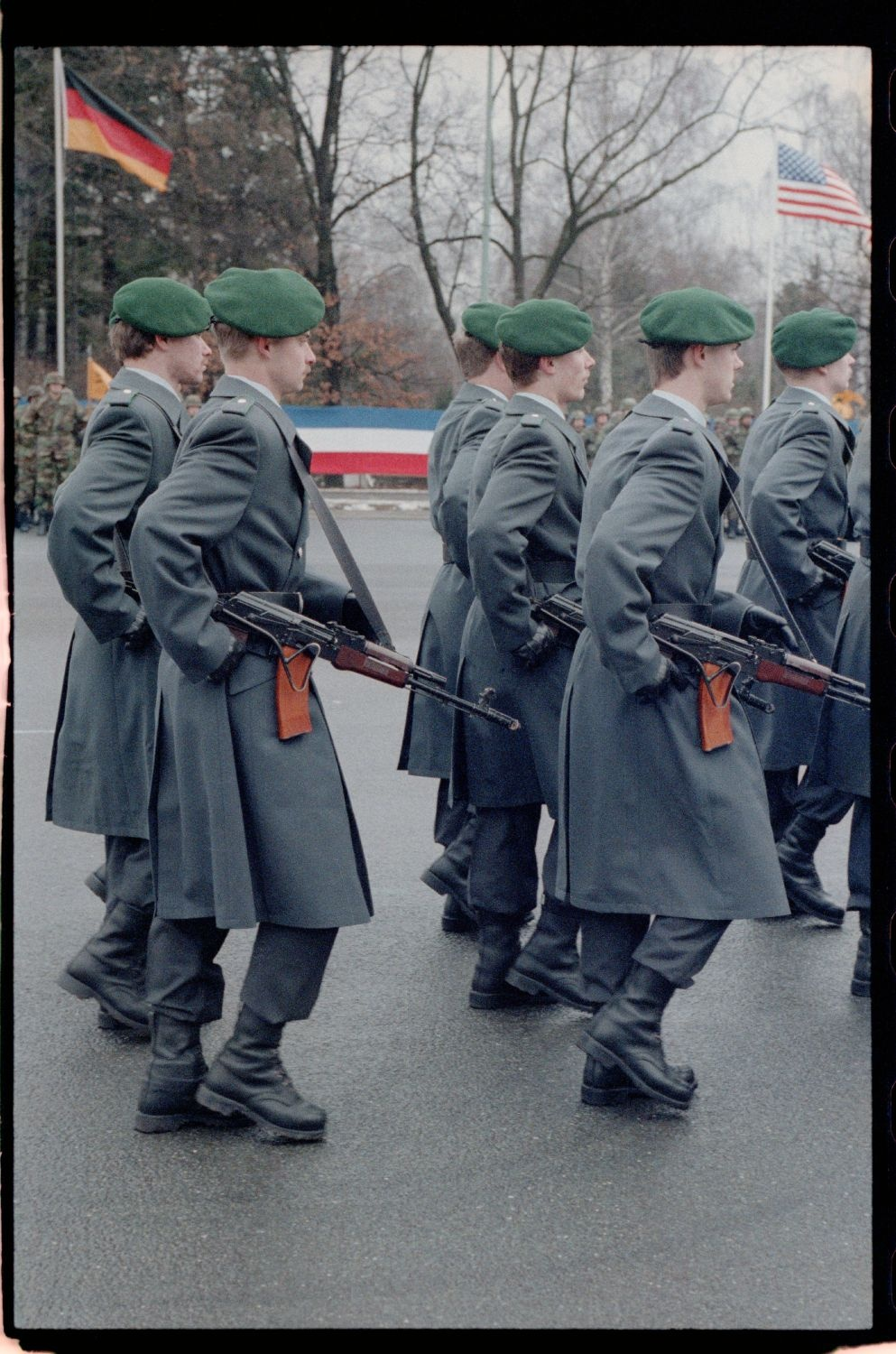
German soldiers with MPi-AKS-74N rifles. Germany inherited East German-made AK-74 variants after German reunification.

- Artsakh
- Bulgaria: AK-74, AKS-74 and AKS-74U used by the Bulgarian Armed Forces, produced locally. Phased out in the military in favor of the older AK-47 and AKM rifles, presumably because of the wider availability of 7.62x39mm in Bulgaria. Some were inherited by the Ministry of Interior but were "banned from police use" in the 90s.
- Chechen Republic of Ichkeria: AK-74, AKS-74 and AK-74M.
- Croatia: MPi-AKS-74N used by Croatian Armed Forces, obtained from Germany.
- East Germany: Manufactured locally as the MPi-AK-74N, MPi-AKS-74N, and MPi-AKS-74NK. 171,925 AK-74s in 1991.
- Germany: In storage.
- Soviet Union: First used during the Soviet–Afghan War in 1979.

=== States with limited recognition ===
- Abkhazia
- Donetsk People's Republic
- Luhansk People's Republic
- South Ossetia
- Transnistria

=== Non-state users ===
- Aum Shinrikyo: Some manufactured by the cult. Only one was completed before police raided their covert manufacturing facilities.
- Islamic State of Iraq and the Levant: Used by Islamic State terrorists (also seen in many Islamic State Propaganda videos)
- Kurdistan Workers' Party
- Liberation Tigers of Tamil Eelam: Used during the Sri Lankan Civil War between 1983 and 2009.
- Lord's Resistance Army
- Provisional IRA

== See also ==
- M16 rifle
- Comparison of the AK-74 vs. M16A2
- Pușcă Automată model 1986

== Notes ==
=== References ===
- Cutshaw, Charlie (1998). The New World of Russian Small Arms & Ammo. Boulder, Colo.: Paladin Press. ISBN 978-0-87364-993-3.
- Kokalis, Peter (2001). Weapons Tests and Evaluations: The Best of Soldier of Fortune. Boulder, Colo.: Paladin Press. ISBN 978-1-58160-122-0.
- McNab, Chris (2001). The AK47 (Weapons of War). Staplehurst, UK: Spellmount Publishers. ISBN 978-1-86227-116-6.
- Mitzer, Stijn; Oliemans, Joost (2020). The Armed Forces of North Korea: On the Path of Songun. Helion and Company. ISBN 978-1910777145.
- Walter, John (2006). Rifles of the World (3rd ed.). Iola, Wis.: Krause Publications. ISBN 978-0-89689-241-5.
- Woźniak, Ryszard (2001). Encyklopedia najnowszej broni palnej – tom 1 A-F (in Polish). Warsaw, Poland: Bellona. pp. 25–29. ISBN 978-83-11-09149-8.
- Monetchikov, Sergei (2005). История русского автомата [The History of Russian Assault Rifle] (in Russian). St. Petersburg: Military Historical Museum of Artillery, Engineers and Signal Corps. ISBN 978-5-98655-006-0.
