= Karl Wiegers =

American software engineer and author

Karl E. Wiegers is an American software engineer.

== Selected works ==
- 1999. Software Requirements. 1st Edition. Microsoft Press. ISBN 0-7356-0631-5
