= Wiggers =

Wiggers is a German and Dutch patronymic surname. The given name Wigger is a form of the Germanic Wichard, from Wîh- ("battle") and -hard ("strong"). Variant spelling include Wichers and Wiggerts. People with this surname include

- Carl J. Wiggers (1883–1963), American physiologist
  - Wiggers diagram, a cardiac physiology diagram he devised
- Charles Wiggers (fl. 1920), Belgian racewalker
- Dirceu Wiggers de Oliveira Filho (born 1988), Brazilian football defender
- Friedrich Heinrich Wiggers (1746–1811), German botanist
- Heinrich August Ludwig Wiggers (1803–1880), German pharmacist
- Hermann Wiggers (1880–1968), German football defender
- Julius Wiggers (1811–1901), German theologist
- Ketlen Wiggers (born 1992), Brazilian football forward
- Lone Wiggers (born 1963), Danish architect
- Martin H. Wiggers (born 1963), German economist, editor, author and businessman
- Michaël Wiggers (born 1980), Belgian football defender
- Moritz Wiggers (1816–1894), German lawyer and revolutionary
- Namita Gupta Wiggers (born 1967), American contemporary craft expert, curator and writer
- Thais Souza Wiggers (born 1985), Brazilian television presenter and model
- Tom Wiggers (born 1987), Dutch long-distance runner

Wichers

- Edward Wichers (1892–1984), American chemist
- Herman Pieter Schönfeld Wichers (1902–1990), Dutch writer known as "Belcampo"
- Johan Wichers (1887–1956), Dutch composer of marches
- Otto Wichers (born 1981), Dutch singer-songwriter
- Peter Wichers (born 1979), Swedish heavy metal bass guitarist

== See also ==
- Wigger (disambiguation), including people with the surname Wigger
- Wiegers, surname of the same origin
