= AK-105 =

Russian short barrel assault rifle

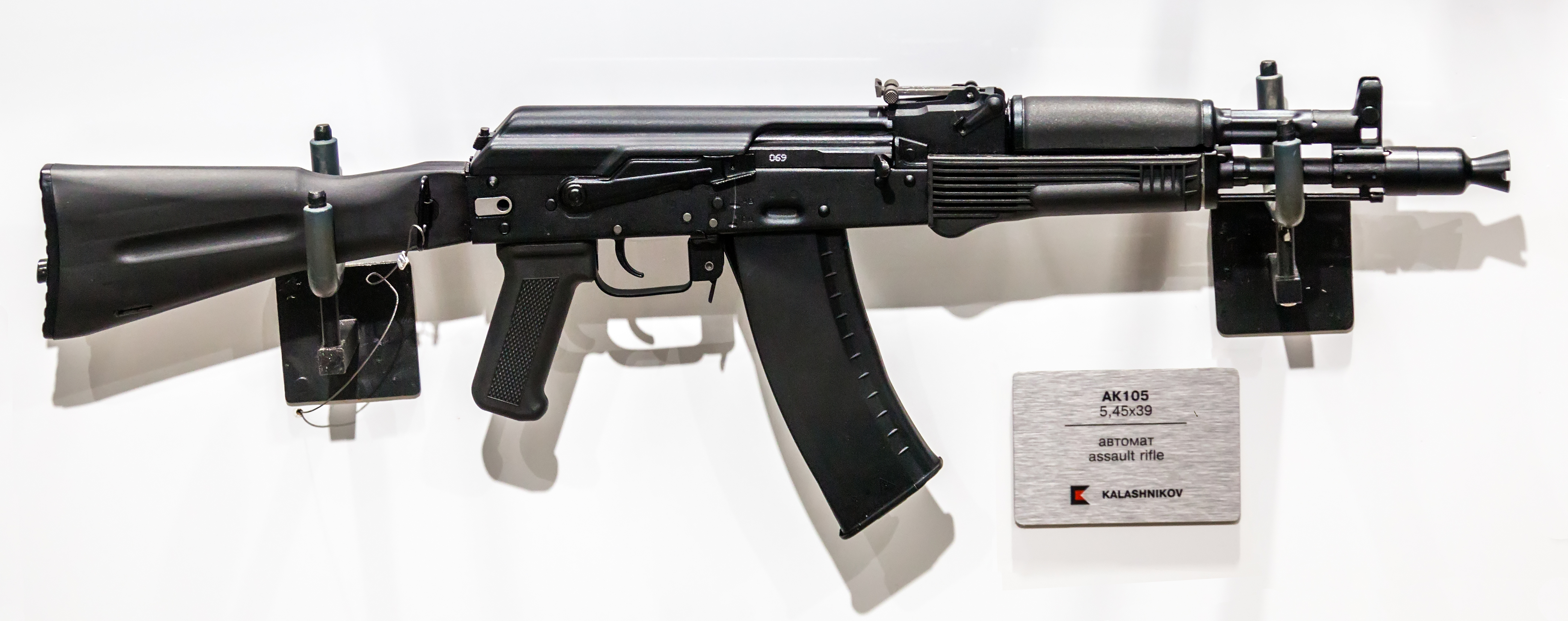
- The AK-105 carbine
- Type: Assault Rifle, Carbine
- Place of origin: Russia

Service history
- In service: 2001–present
- Used by: See Users

Production history
- Designer: Mikhail Kalashnikov
- Designed: 1994
- Manufacturer: Izhmash
- Produced: 1994

Specifications
- Mass: 3.2 kg (7.1 lb) with empty magazine
- Length: 824 mm (32.4 in) with stock extended / 586 mm (23.1 in) with stock folded
- Barrel length: 314 mm (12.4 in)
- Cartridge: 5.45×39mm
- Caliber: 5.45mm
- Action: Gas-actuated, rotating bolt
- Rate of fire: 600 rounds/min
- Muzzle velocity: 840 m/s (2,800 ft/s)
- Effective firing range: 300 m (330 yd)
- Feed system: 30-round detachable box magazine or 60-round casket magazine
- Sights: Adjustable iron sights, equipped with a side mounted dovetail rail for attaching various optics and night sights

The AK-105 is a short barrel, carbine version of the AK-74M rifle, originally developed to replace the shorter barrelled AKS-74U. The AK-105 is chambered in 5.45×39mm ammunition and is used domestically by the Russian Army in contrast to other AK-100 series rifles.

The carbine is produced at Izhmash factories in Izhevsk, Russia. It is part of the AK-100 family.

== Design ==
Compared to the AK-74M, AK-101, and AK-103, which are full-length assault rifles of similar design, the AK-105 is a carbine rifle featuring a shorter 12.4 in (310 mm) barrel, and a solid, side-folding, polymer stock allowing convenience in transportation or paratrooper operations, while still providing a stable firing platform when extended; the AK-105 retains the ability to fire with the stock folded.

The AK-105 has matching polymer furniture including pistol grip, magazines and forward handguard. It was developed to replace the even shorter compact AKS-74U, (however both rifles are in-service) that featured a shorter skeleton stock and a shorter, 8.1 in (210 mm) barrel. The AK-105 uses an adjustable, U‑notch, rear tangent sight, calibrated in 100 m (109 yd) increments out to 500 m (547 yd). The front sight is a post, adjustable for elevation in the field, while windage adjustments are done prior to issue by the armory.

According to the manufacturer's web site in 2014, "Protective coatings ensure excellent corrosion resistance of metal parts. Forearm, magazine, butt stock and pistol grip are made of high strength plastic." The AK‑105 has a muzzle booster derived from the AKS‑74U that aids in reducing recoil and improving stability of automatic fire, through the use of exiting gasses.

== Users ==
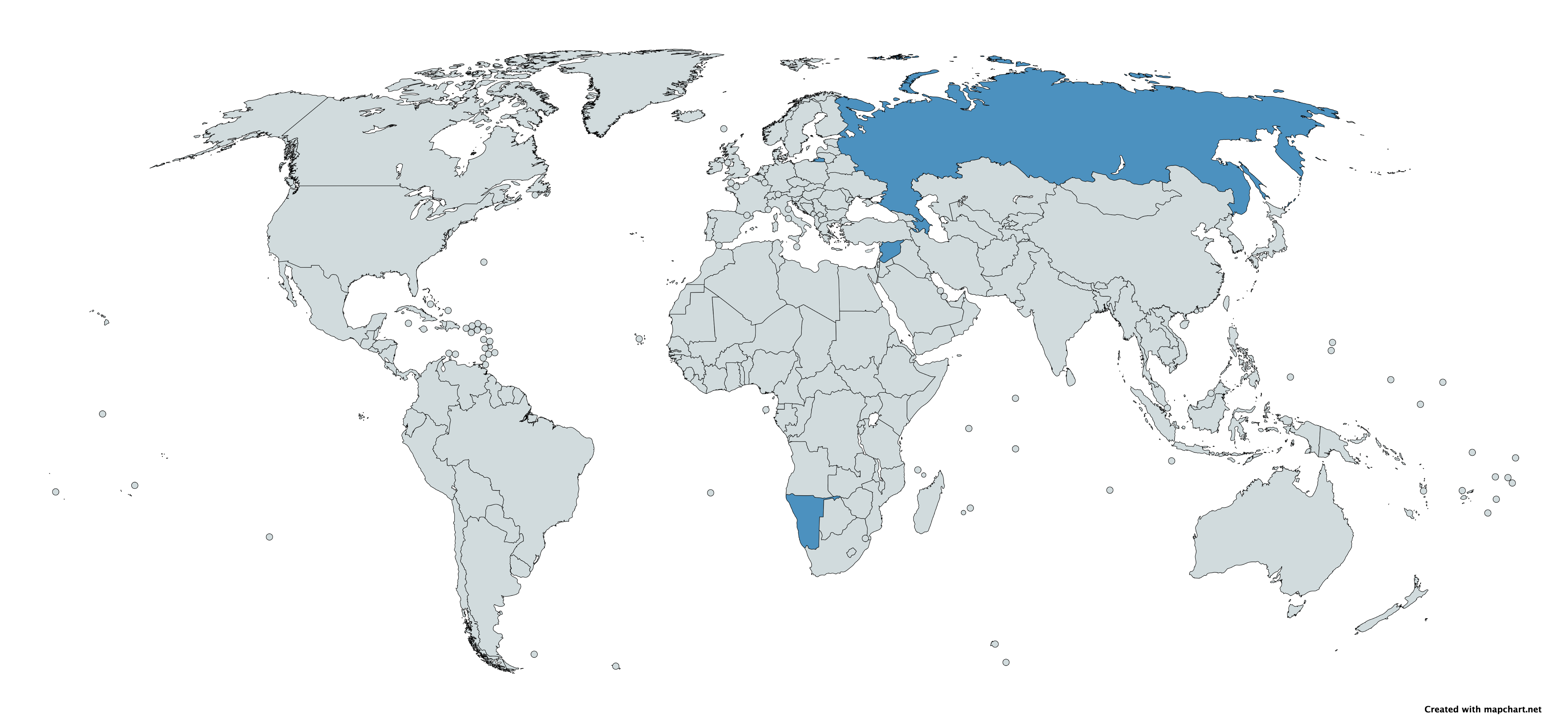
A map with AK-105 users in blue

- Armenia
- Azerbaijan: Used by the State Border Service.
- Brazil: Brazilian military and law enforcement have adopted the AK-105 as it is suitable for urban and counter-narcotics operations.
- Kazakhstan: The Kazakh military use the AK-105 as a standard-issue carbine rifle.
- Namibia: Used by Namibian Marine Corps
- North Korea: Produced locally as an unlicensed copy, the Type 88 carbine, used by Special Operations Forces and armored crews.
- Russia: In service with the Russian Army, and limited use within the Ministry of Internal Affairs and other law enforcement, including Alpha Group of the Federal Security Service (FSB).
- Syria: Used by some Syrian special forces.
