= AK-101 =

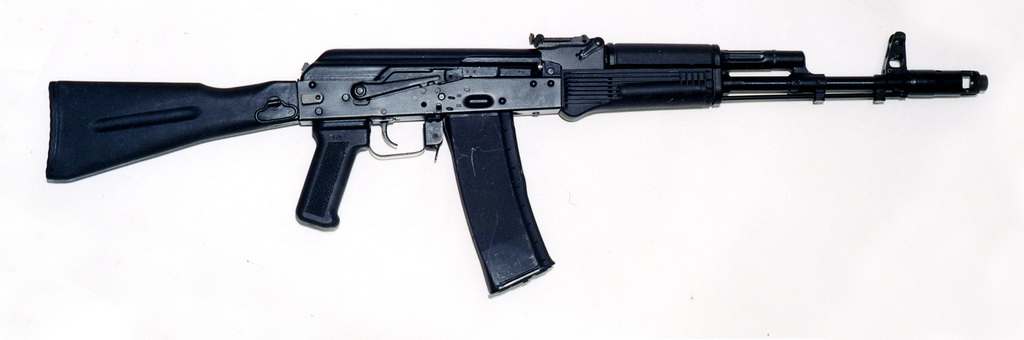
- AK-101
- Type: Assault rifle
- Place of origin: Russia

Service history
- In service: 1995–present
- Used by: See Users
- Wars: Papua conflict; Insurgency in Aceh; Syrian Civil War; Operation Madago Raya

Production history
- Designer: Mikhail Kalashnikov
- Designed: 1994
- Manufacturer: Kalashnikov Concern
- Produced: 1995–present
- No. built: 270,500+
- Variants: AK-102; RPK-201

Specifications
- Mass: 3.6 kg (7.9 lb) without magazine 4 kg (8.8 lb) fully loaded
- Length: 943 mm (37.1 in) with stock extended / 700 mm (28 in) with stock folded
- Barrel length: 415 mm (16.3 in)
- Cartridge: 5.56×45mm NATO
- Caliber: 5.56mm
- Action: Gas-Operated, rotating bolt with two lugs
- Rate of fire: 600 rounds/min
- Muzzle velocity: 910 m/s (3,000 ft/s)
- Effective firing range: 500 m (550 yd)
- Feed system: 30-round detachable box magazine 45-round detachable box magazine from the RPK-201
- Sights: Adjustable iron sights, Equipped with optical plate for attaching various scopes

The AK-101 is a Kalashnikov assault rifle model developed in 1994 to use the 5.56×45mm NATO cartridge belonging to the export AK-100 (rifle family).

== Design ==
The AK-101 is a selective fire weapon that can be fired in either semi-automatic or fully automatic mode. The disassembly procedure for the AK-101 is identical to that of the AK-74 as the design is similar to the AK-74M. It's constructed using composite materials, including plastics, which affect its weight and durability. Features of the AK-101 are also present in the AK-103 and other rifles in the AK-100 series.

The AK-101 has an attachment rail installed on the side of the receiver for mounting scopes and other optical sights, which will accept most types of Russian and European AK optics. The rifle accepts most synthetic and metal AK-74-style magazines with 30-round capacity. The AK-101 has a 415 mm (16.3 in) barrel with an AK-74 style muzzle brake attached to the barrel to control muzzle climb.

The AK-101 is chambered in 5.56mm NATO and features a black glass-filled polyamide side folding stock, which folds to the left.

The side folding stock looks similar to a normal fixed stock, but folds and locks securely to the left side of the receiver. It has a cutout to compensate for the side rail.

== Variants ==
=== Norinco AK-2000 ===
Norinco produced a copy of the AK-101 as the AK-2000, with the stock of the Type 56-2. It has been in service with Indonesian police units.

=== KR-101 ===
A semiautomatic AK-101 clone was made by Kalashnikov-USA(No affiliation with Kalashnikov Concern) in 2022.

=== PSA AK-101 ===
A semiautomatic clone of the AK-101 made by Palmetto State Armory.

== Users ==
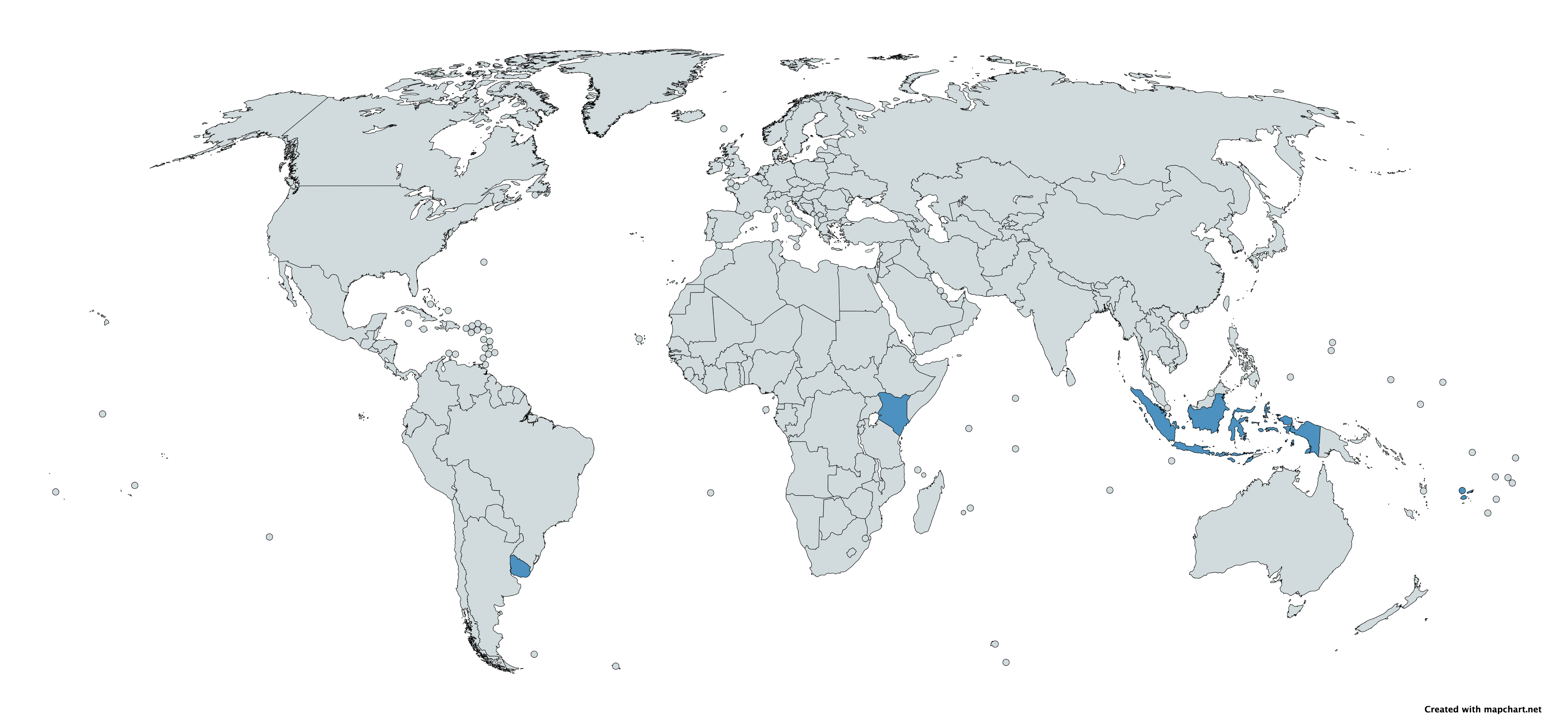
A map with AK-101 users in blue

- Fiji
- Indonesia: Indonesian Marine Corps and the Mobile Brigade Corps.
- Kenya
- Uruguay

== Gallery ==
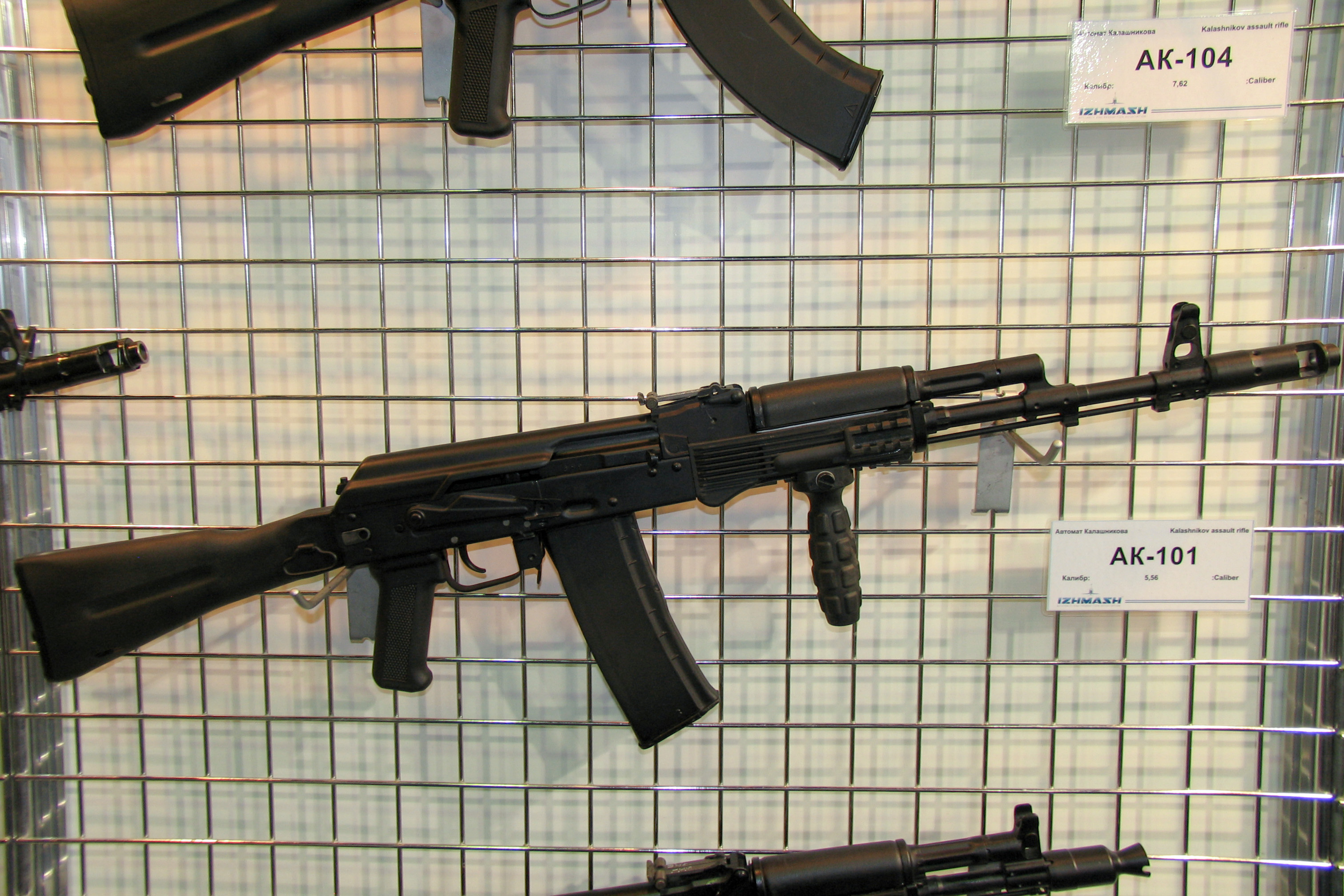
AK-101 on display

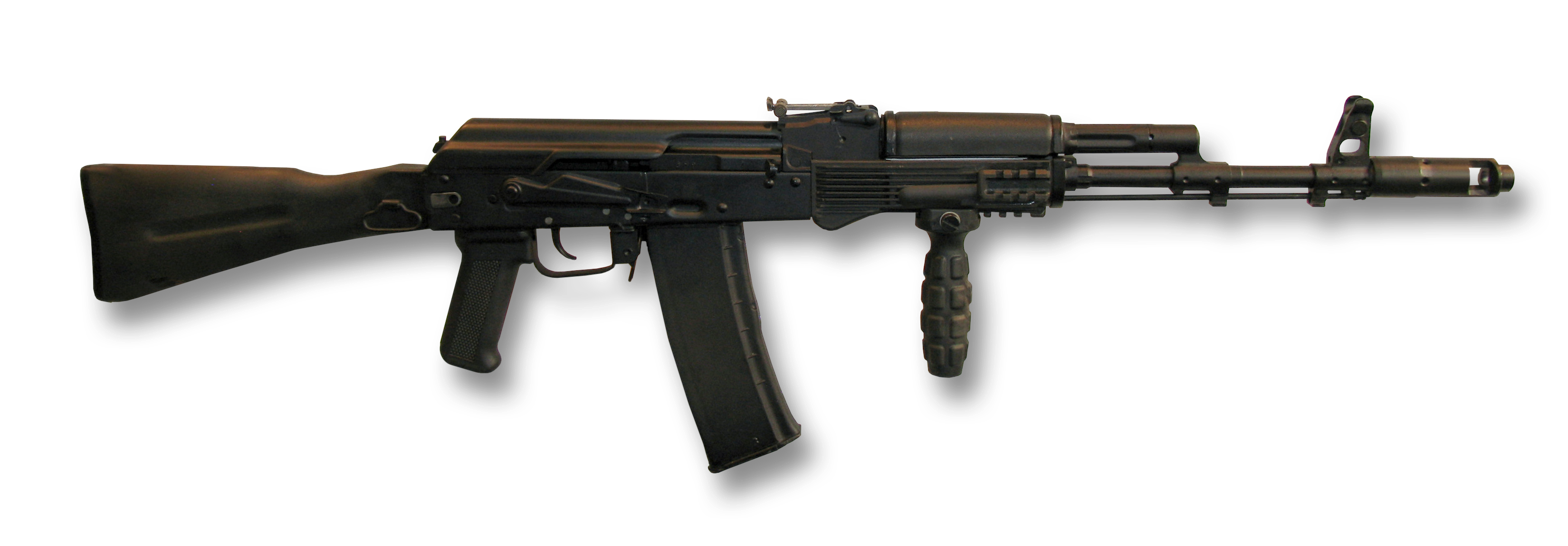
AK-101 with foregrip

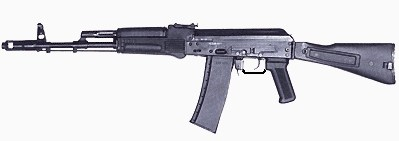
AK-101

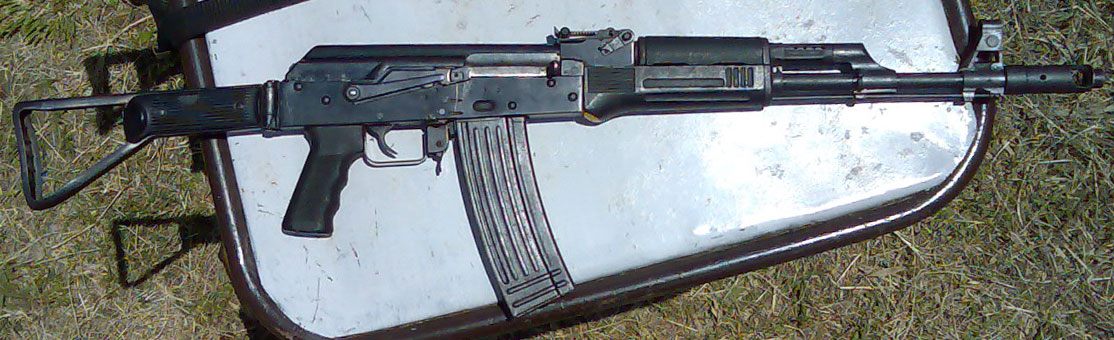
An AK-2000P of the Indonesian Mobile Brigade Corps
