= Wiegert =

Wiegert is a surname. Notable people with the surname include:

- Gerald Wiegert (1944–2021), American automobile designer and manufacturer
- Ingolf Wiegert (born 1957), East German handball player
- Paul Wiegert (born 1967), Canadian astronomer
- Zach Wiegert (born 1972), American football player
