= AK-107 =

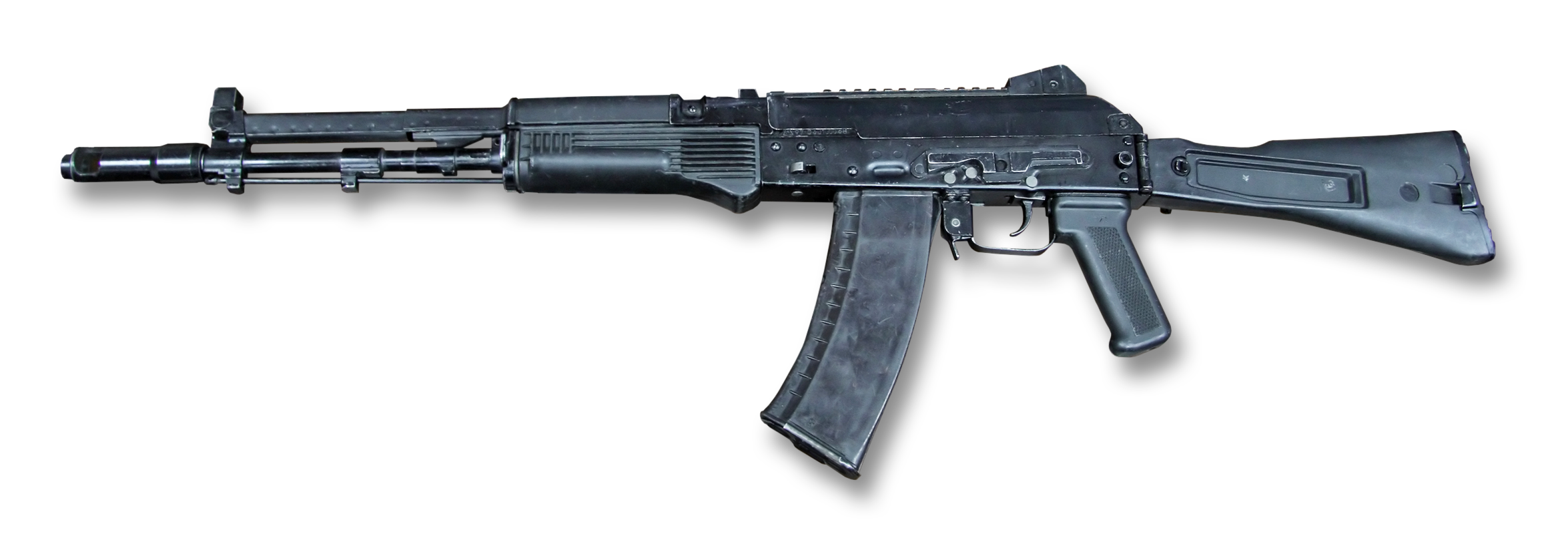
- AK-107 assault rifle
- Type: Assault rifle
- Place of origin: Russia

Service history
- In service: 2010–present

Production history
- Designer: Yuriy K. Alexandrov
- Designed: 1990s
- Manufacturer: Kalashnikov Concern
- Produced: 1994–present
- Variants: AK-108

Specifications
- Mass: 3.8 kg (8.38 lb)
- Length: 943 mm (37.1 in) stock extended 700 mm (27.6 in) stock folded
- Barrel length: 415 mm (16.3 in)
- Cartridge: 5.45×39mm (AK-107); 5.56×45mm NATO (AK-108)
- Action: Gas-operated, rotating bolt, BARS system
- Rate of fire: 850 rounds/min (AK-107); 900 rounds/min (AK-108)
- Muzzle velocity: 900 m/s (2,953 ft/s) (AK-107); 910 m/s (2,985.6 ft/s) (AK-108)
- Effective firing range: 500 m (550 yd)
- Maximum firing range: 800 m (870 yd)
- Feed system: 30-round detachable box magazine 60-round AK-200-compatible casket magazines
- Sights: Protected front post, rear V-notch on tangent

The AK-107 is a Russian 5.45×39mm assault rifle developed from the AK-100-series. It features a "balanced" operating system, similar to that used in the AEK-971. In this case, the designation AK does not indicate Avtomat Kalashnikova but Alexandrov/Kalashnikov. The revised designation indicates the incorporation of a new gas system, designed by Youriy Alexandrov, for Kalashnikov-pattern rifles.

These new rifles were derived from the AL-7 experimental rifle of the early 1970s. The AL-7 utilized an innovative balanced gas operating system known as the Balanced Automatics Recoil System (BARS) developed by Peter Andreevich Tkachev of TsNIITochMash that was first used earlier on the AO-38 assault rifle of 1965 that essentially eliminated felt recoil and muzzle rise. The system was modified by Alexandrov, then a junior engineer at Izhmash, and prototypes were produced under the designation AL-7. The AL-7 was considered too expensive for production at the time and the Soviet Army selected the AK-74 instead as the new service rifle. No further development occurred until the mid-1990s when Alexandrov, by then a senior engineer, was directed to update his design for production as a less expensive alternative to the AN-94. The new rifle differs only slightly from the original AL-7. The AK-107 receiver is not fluted and a three-round burst feature has been added. There is otherwise little difference between it and the AL-7 prototypes.

== Design details ==
The AK-107 and AK-108 represent a significant change to the Kalashnikov operating system originally designed in the late 1940s. This system uses a recoil-reducing countermass mechanism with two operating rods that move in opposite directions, thereby providing "balance". One operating rod, the upper, has a gas piston facing forward while the lower also has a gas piston. The gas tube at the forward end of the handguard is double-ended to accommodate the two rods. The enlarged gas tube cover of the upper handguard guides both rods in their travel.

When the rifle is fired, gas is tapped from the gas port to enter the gas tube, driving the bolt carrier to the rear and the counter-recoil upper rail forward. The critical timing of the reciprocating parts is accomplished by a star-shaped sprocket that links and synchronizes both components, causing both to reach their maximum extension, or null point where forces are exactly equal, at exactly the same instant. The felt recoil is therefore eliminated, enhancing accuracy and assisting control during fully automatic fire. The travel distance of the AK-107 reciprocating parts is less than other Kalashnikov designs, so the cyclic rate is higher at 850–900 rounds/min rather than 600 rounds/min on other AK rifles. However, as the felt recoil is virtually eliminated, the manufacturer claims that accuracy is enhanced, especially during burst fire.

The AK-107 is a selective fire weapon, with a three-round burst capability in addition to semi-automatic and fully automatic firing modes. The system on the AK-107 resets to three-round burst each time the trigger is released, even if only one or two rounds were fired. External differences between the AK-107 and its predecessors are minor. They include a modified ejection port and a much thicker operating rod cover. The method of attaching the receiver cover now involves a rotating latch in place of the traditional Kalashnikov button at the rear of the receiver cover. The rear sight is also attached directly to the receiver cover rather than to the receiver itself and the selector has four positions instead of three. Optical and night sights can be installed, the rifle can also accept a 40 mm GP-25 grenade launcher.

The AK-108 is a version of the AK-107 chambered in 5.56×45mm NATO. The AK-100 series use synthetic materials such as black fiberglass-reinforced polymer for the pistol grip and heat shield. This material is more cost efficient and much stronger than the original AKM/AK-74 wood furniture.

=== MK-107 ===
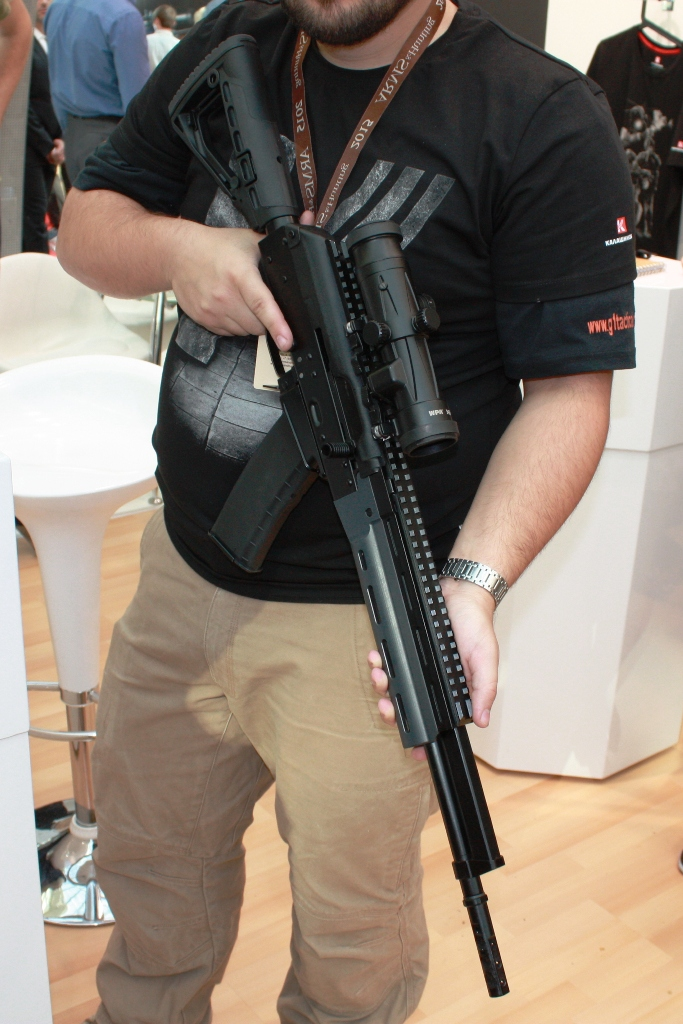
Saiga MK-107

In March 2013, Izhmash debuted a civilian version of the AK-107/AK-108 rifle designated the Saiga MK-107. The MK-107 features improvements over the original AK-107 design including a rounded ergonomic charging handle, a button-style safety above the trigger guard, AR-15-style pistol grip and stock (made by Israeli firm CAA Tactical), and full length top picatinny rail.

== Users ==
- Kazakhstan
- Russia Currently being tested by the Russian military with new features including an enhanced stock, top and side-mounted accessory rails, high-capacity Izhmash 60-round quad-stack magazine, and holographic sight.

== See also ==
- AEK-971
- AK-12
- AL-7
- AN-94
- AO-38
- AO-63
- Project Abakan
- List of Russian weaponry
- List of assault rifles
