= Project Abakan =

1980–1994 Soviet and Russian weapons program

Project Abakan was a Soviet/Russian advanced assault rifle program in rival to the US Advanced Combat Rifle that took place between 1980 and 1994.

== History ==
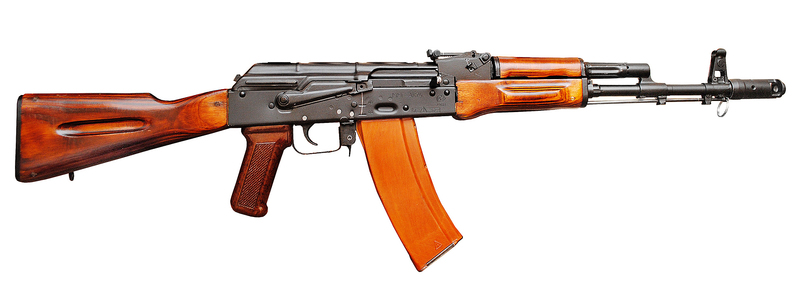
AK-74 assault rifle.

The 1960s ushered a new generation of assault rifles with the introduction of smaller calibers. U.S. military analysis of combat during the Second World War showed that a greater volume of fire at shorter ranges was more significant than long range accuracy. They decided that a smaller caliber would be more effective in most conditions, because the soldier could carry more ammunition. In 1963, United States adopted the M16 rifle and the smaller 5.56×45mm cartridge to replace the M14 Rifle and larger 7.62×51mm. In 1980, NATO adopted the 5.56mm as the standard-issue rifle cartridge.

In 1974, the Soviet Army also replaced the AKM with the AK-74 assault rifle chambered for the new smaller 5.45×39mm caliber. In spite of the smaller caliber and many other improvements the AK-74 failed to overcome the major shortcoming of its predecessor, which was the low accuracy of short bursts of fire.

== Specifications ==
Soviet analysts determined that modern battlefield tactics require short bursts of fire from shooting positions including standing, kneeling and prone (lying down). The requirement for more accurate bursts of fire was one of the most important aspects of the Required Operational Capability (ROC) specification for any replacement of the AK-74. Therefore, in 1981 the Commission of the Council of Ministers of the USSR in the military-industrial issued Required Operational Capability (ROC) number 280 27.08.81. Because of the expensive and time-consuming nature of manufacturing and adopting a new assault rifle this ROC specified that any new assault rifle had to be 1.5 to 2.0 times more "combat effective" than the AK-74.

The complexity of modern firearms design and manufacturing dictated that design bureaus with dedicated manufacturing facilities were enlisted to design and manufacture prototypes. The prototypes were produced after three years by TsKIB SOO (subsidiary of KBP Instrument Design Bureau), Kovrovskiy mechanical and Izhmash (Izhevsk Mechanical Works) plants under the general guidance of TsNIITochMash (Central Research Institute for Precision Machine Building).

== Trials ==
=== First stage ===
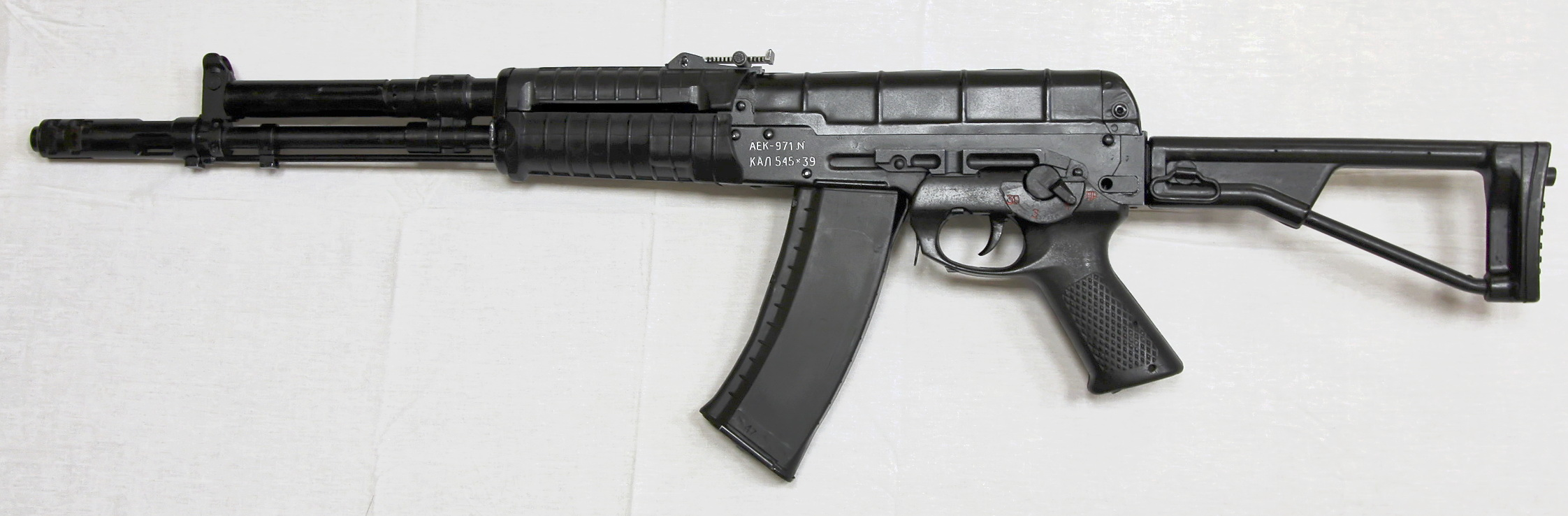
AEK-971.

By August 1984, eight prototypes from eight designers were ready to be tested. Preliminary trials on the technical design stage in August and November 1984 were subjected to assault rifles:

Bureau	Model	Designer
TsKIB SOO
TsKIB SOO	TKB-0111	G.A. Korobov
TsKIB SOO	TKB-0136-3M	N.M. Afanasyev
TsKIB SOO	TKB-0146	I.Y. Stechkin
SKB KMZ
SKB KMZ	AEK-971	B.A. Garev
SKB KMZ	AEK-978	P.A Pikinsky
PO Izhmash
PO Izhmash	AL-9	V.M. Kalashnikov
PO Izhmash	AS	G.N. Nikonov
IzhNITI	APT	I.A. Postnikov

The Commission, appointed by the decision Ministry of Defence and GRAU, reviewed the test results and confirmed the possibility of finding a candidate that meets the initial ROC specifications. Two designs were eliminated after this first stage of testing: the automatic APT, because of its unreliability, and the TKB-0111 (the least promising). The remaining designs went through 18 months of further development to improve manufacturing details and accuracy.

=== Second stage ===
From May to June 1986, following the 18-month development period, one of the remaining six designs, the AL-9 was replaced by the AKB-1 and new prototype was added, the AO-63 assault rifle (designed by S.G. Simonov and P.A. Tkachev).

Tests included firing a high volumes of rounds under extreme conditions including dust, extreme temperatures and altitudes. No prototype met all requirements. Only the AS and AO-63 met the requirement of accurate grouping.

Designers were given three months to update their designs before the tests were repeated in late October 1986. Two designs were modified fundamentally for this round of testing; the ASM construction by Nikonov (shift in momentum returns in the stationary store) and the battery instead of AKB-1 design Kalashnikov (balanced automatics).

Further developments of the prototypes were limited to muzzle devices. Halfway through the tests it became clear that it was not viable to continue further work the TKB-0111, AEK-971 and AKB.

=== Results and outcome ===
The AS/ASM and TKB-0146 showed excellent accuracy. Testers and members of the commission all noted the great comfort with which both of these weapons could be fired. The recoil was also light enough that the weapons could be fired without having to shoulder them. Both were capable of firing a two-shot burst at such a high rate of fire that it sounded like a single shot. Observers could also see the trajectory of the two bullets. Eventually, the AS/ASM was selected and designated the AN-94 (Assault-rifle, Nikonov, 1994).
