= AL-7 =

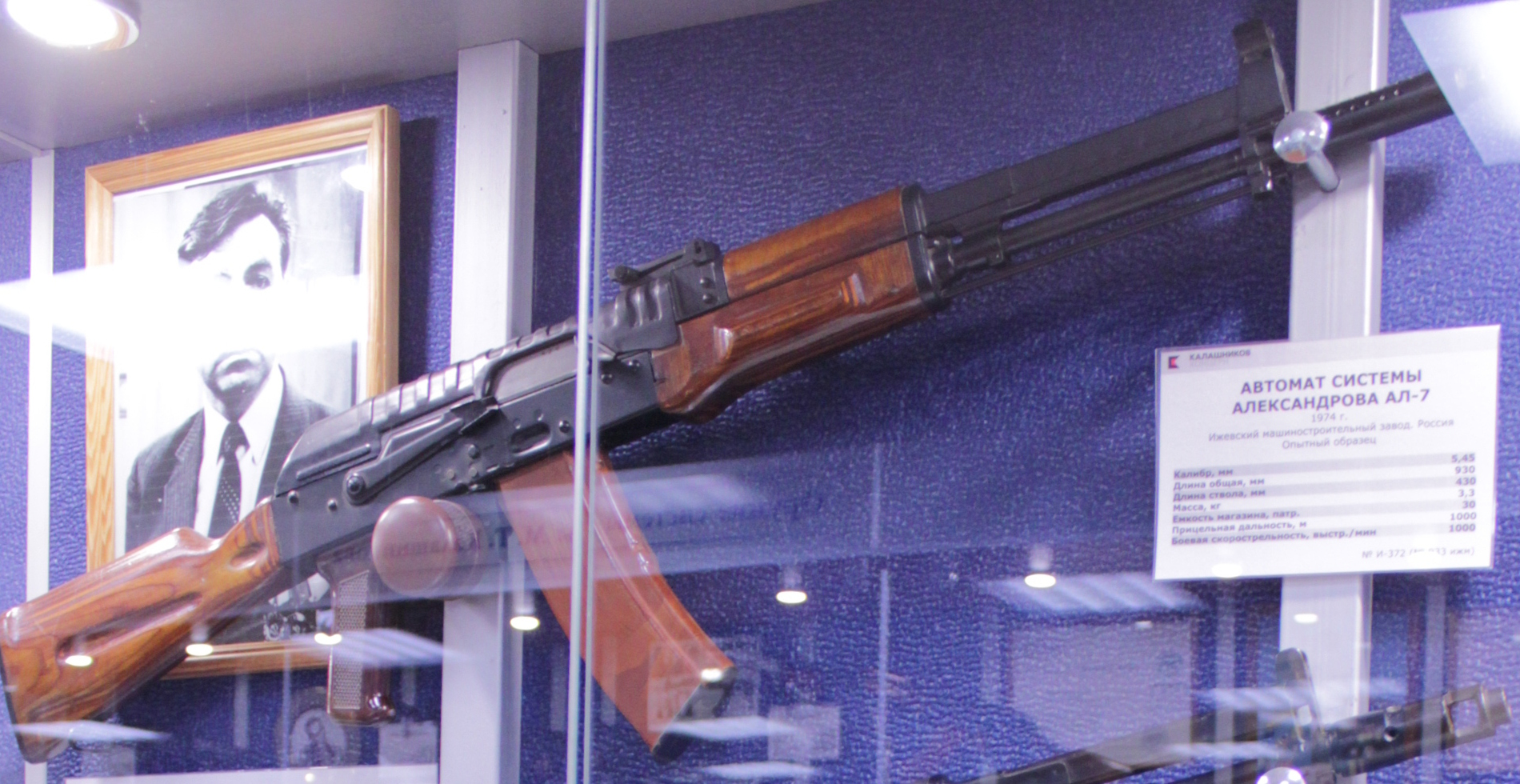
- AL-7 in Izhmash museum
- Type: Assault rifle
- Place of origin: Soviet Union

Production history
- Designer: Yury Aleksandrov
- Manufacturer: Izhmash

Specifications
- Mass: 8.6 pounds
- Length: 36.5"
- Cartridge: 5.45×39mm
- Action: Gas operated, rotating bolt
- Muzzle velocity: 2,491 F/S
- Effective firing range: 1100–1500 yards
- Feed system: 30 round box magazine
- Sights: Iron

The AL-7 is a Soviet assault rifle designed by Izhmash engineer Yury Aleksandrov in the early 1970s. The AL-7 uses a type of operation developed by Pyotr Tkachyov of TsNIITochMash (Central Institute for Precision Machine Building) in the mid-1960s known as Balanced Automatics first used on the AO-38 assault rifle. The Balanced Automatics Recoil System (BARS) replaces the traditional Kalashnikov gas piston operating system, reducing the negative effects of recoil and allowing more efficient use of automatic fire. BARS works by shifting mass toward the muzzle of the rifle as the bolt and bolt carrier recoil rearward.

The AL-7 and its BARS system were never adopted by the Soviet Army. The project was overshadowed by the acceptance of the AK-74 due to cost considerations. The passage of time has allowed manufacturing technology to advance, finally making the AL-7 concept economically viable, presenting itself in the form of the AK-107 and AK-108 rifles.

Other rifles that use the balanced automatics system are the AEK-971, AO-38, SA-006, AKB and AKB-1.

== See also ==
- AEK-971
- AO-38
- AO-63
- AK-107
