= AO-38 assault rifle =

AO-38
- Type: Assault rifle
- Place of origin: Soviet Union

Production history
- Designer: Peter Andreevich Tkachev
- Designed: 1965
- Manufacturer: TsNIITochMash

Specifications
- Cartridge: 5.45×39mm
- Caliber: 5.45mm
- Action: Gas operated
- Feed system: 30-round detachable box magazine
- Sights: Iron sights

The AO-38 is a 5.45×39mm assault rifle and AK derivative designed by Peter Andreevich Tkachev and first to use the Balanced Automatic Recoil System (BARS) to improve stability giving better accuracy over AK-74's. Its derivatives are the AK-107 and AEK-971.

== See also ==
- AL-7
- AN-94
- List of assault rifles
