= Nikonov (disambiguation) =

Nikonov is a Russian surname.

Nikonov may also refer to:

- Nikonov machine gun
- 2386 Nikonov
- Nikonov, Astrakhan Oblast
