= AL 7 =

AL 7 and AL-7 may refer to:

- The AL-7 assault rifle
- Lyulka AL-7 turbojet
- U.S. Route 11 in Alabama, internally signed Alabama State Route 7
- Alabama's 7th congressional district
