= Peter Tkachev =

Peter Tkachev may refer to:

- Pyotr Tkachev (1844–1886), Russian writer, critic and revolutionary theorist
- Peter Andreevich Tkachev, Russian weapons engineer
