= AO-38 =

AO-38 may refer to:

- USS Winooski (AO-38), United States Navy oiler which saw service during World War II
- AO-38 assault rifle, a Russian firearm
