= AEK-971 =

Russian balanced-recoil assault rifle and variants

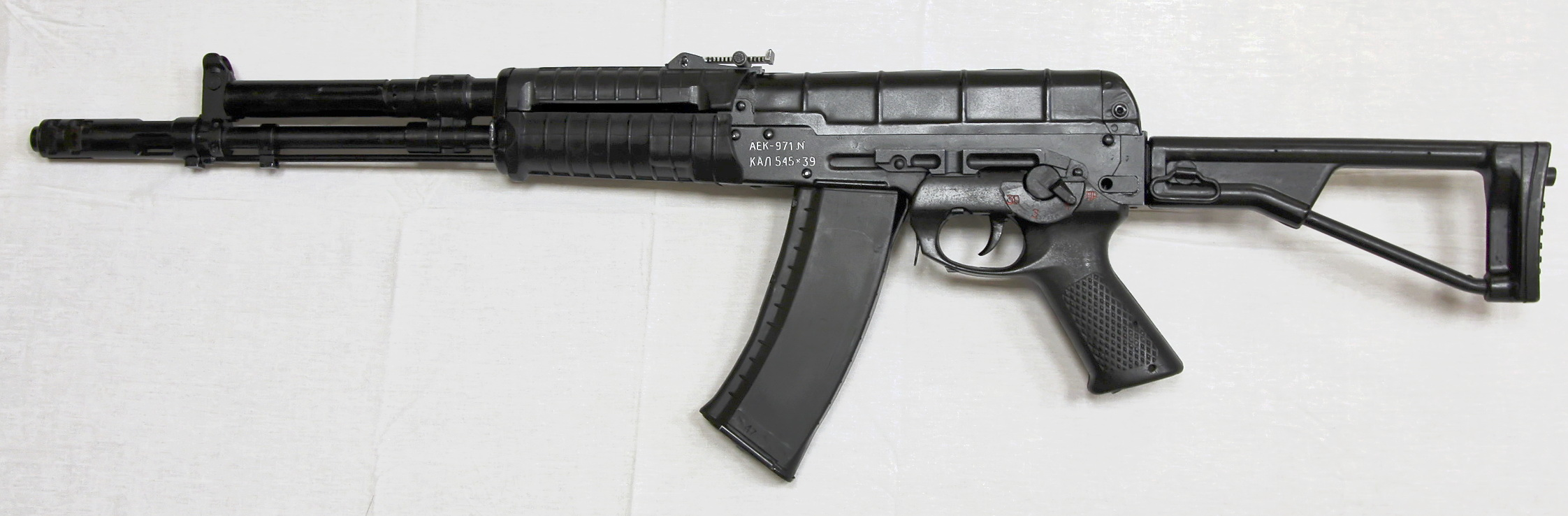
- AEK-971 5.45×39mm balanced-recoil assault rifle
- Type: Assault rifle
- Place of origin: Soviet Union

Service history
- In service: 1980–present 2018–present (KORD rifle)
- Used by: See Users
- Wars: Second Chechen war 2022 Russian Invasion of Ukraine

Production history
- Designer: Stanislav Koksharov
- Designed: 1978
- Manufacturer: Kovrovskiy Mekhanicheskiy Zavod (original); Degtyarev plant (current)
- Produced: 1990–present
- Variants: See Variants

Specifications
- Mass: 3.3 kg (7.3 lb) unloaded (AEK-971); 3.3 kg (7.3 lb) unloaded (AEK-972); 3.25 kg (7.2 lb) unloaded (AEK-973)
- Length: 960 mm (37.8 in) with stock unfolded 720 mm (28.3 in) with stock folded
- Barrel length: 420 mm (16.5 in)
- Cartridge: 5.45×39mm (AEK-971, AEK-971S, 6P67 KORD); 5.56×45mm NATO (AEK-972); 7.62×39mm (AEK-973, AEK-973S, 6P68 KORD)
- Action: Gas-operated, rotating bolt, balanced recoil system (BARS)
- Rate of fire: 900 rounds/min
- Muzzle velocity: 880 m/s (2,887 ft/s) (AEK-971, AEK-971S); 850 m/s (2,789 ft/s) (AEK-972); 700 m/s (2,297 ft/s) (AEK-973, AEK-973S)
- Effective firing range: 500 m (547 yd)
- Maximum firing range: 100–1,000 m (109–1,094 yd) sight adjustments
- Feed system: AEK-971, AEK-971S, 6P67 KORD: 5.45×39mm AK-74 and RPK-74 30-, 45-round detachable box magazines, 60-round casket magazines AEK-972: 5.56×45mm NATO AK-101, AK-102 and AK-108 magazines AEK-973, AEK-973S, 6P68 KORD: 7.62×39mm AK-47, AKM and RPK magazines
- Sights: AEK-971: Adjustable iron sights, hooded front post and rear notch on a scaled tangent 6P67 KORD: Iron sights that consist of a rotary rear drum aperture and an integrated Picatinny rail for various optics

The AEK-971 (Russian: Автомат единый Кокшарова 971, "Automatic (rifle), Universal, (of) Koksharov, 971) is a selective fire 5.45×39mm assault rifle that features a balanced automatic recoil system, developed at the Kovrov Mechanical Plant (KMZ) by chief designer Stanislav Ivanovich Koksharov (Cyrilic: Станислав Иванович Кокшаров), also known as Sergey Koksharov, in the late 1970s and 1980s (currently manufactured by Degtyarev Plant). Variants in 5.56×45mm NATO (AEK-972) and 7.62×39mm (AEK-973) were also developed.

The 6P67 KORD and 6P68 KORD were developed for the Ratnik trials on 23 December 2014 and are based on the AEK-971 and AEK-973 respectively. The 6P67 KORD and 6P68 KORD feature numerous internal and external improvements over their predecessors and were later adopted by the special forces units (Spetsnaz) of the Russian Armed Forces.

== History ==
The AEK-971 was developed to participate in a competition announced by the Ministry of Defense of the USSR, during which preference was given to the AN-94. The prototype of the AEK-971 differs from the production model, as many innovations were perceived as unnecessary by the Ministry of Defence, which led to a simplification of the prototype. Initially, the prototype featured a 2-round burst mode, which was later changed to a 3-round burst mode in the production model. The AEK-971 is approximately 0.5 kg (1.1 lb) lighter than the AN-94, simpler in design and cheaper to manufacture.

The AN-94, which was officially adopted by the Russian army, has a slight accuracy edge over the AEK-971 in its 2-round-burst mode. However, in full automatic mode or during longer bursts (3–10 rounds per burst), the AEK-971 is more accurate. Although it lost the initial production contract to the AN-94 as a result of the Project Abakan assault rifle selection trials held in Russia from 1980 to 1994, the Russian Army still began field trials for the AEK-971.

The AEK-971 has been combat proven in Chechnya tested by naval infantry and interior forces, and prepared for mass production. Only a few small batches of the AEK-971 have been produced so far and adopted for service with units of the Ministry of Justice of the Russian Federation.

=== Ratnik trials ===
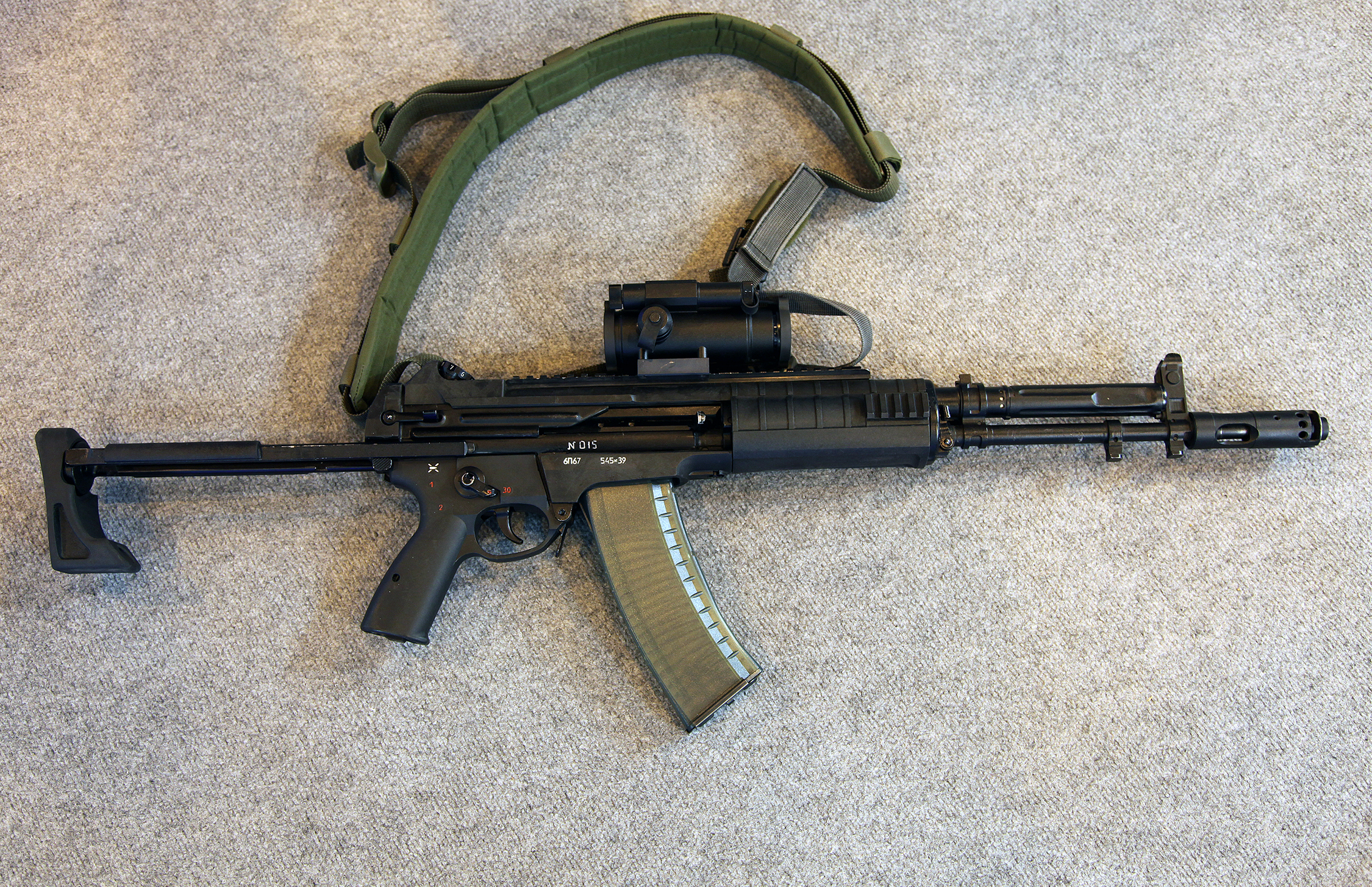
6P67 KORD tested by the Russian Armed Forces in 2014–2015, and adopted in 2018

On 23 December 2014, the Russian Army announced a variant based on the AEK-971, designated as the 6P67 KORD (official GRAU designation 6P67), along with the AK-12 had both passed (Ratnik) state trials and would be accepted into service and set for evaluation with operational units in early 2015. Both systems were recommended for initial batch production and issue for trials in the field. It is possible that in the end both rifles will be adopted by Russian military and other agencies, with the AEK series being oriented towards Special Operations Forces (Spetsnaz) and AK-12 towards infantry and other units. It was expected that both rifles would be tested operationally with the Russian military by March 2015.

In March 2017, it was revealed that the 6P67 KORD would be accepted into Russian service after testing was completed along with the AK-12, although serving border patrol regiments, special forces, and the national guard due to its more complicated and expensive design while the AK-12 would arm regular infantry forces.

In January 2018 it was announced that the 6P67 KORD has been adopted in 5.45×39mm and 7.62×39mm chamberings by the Russian military.

== Design details ==
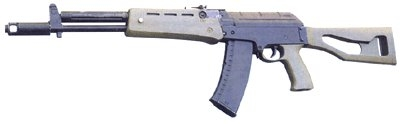
Prototype model of the AEK-971

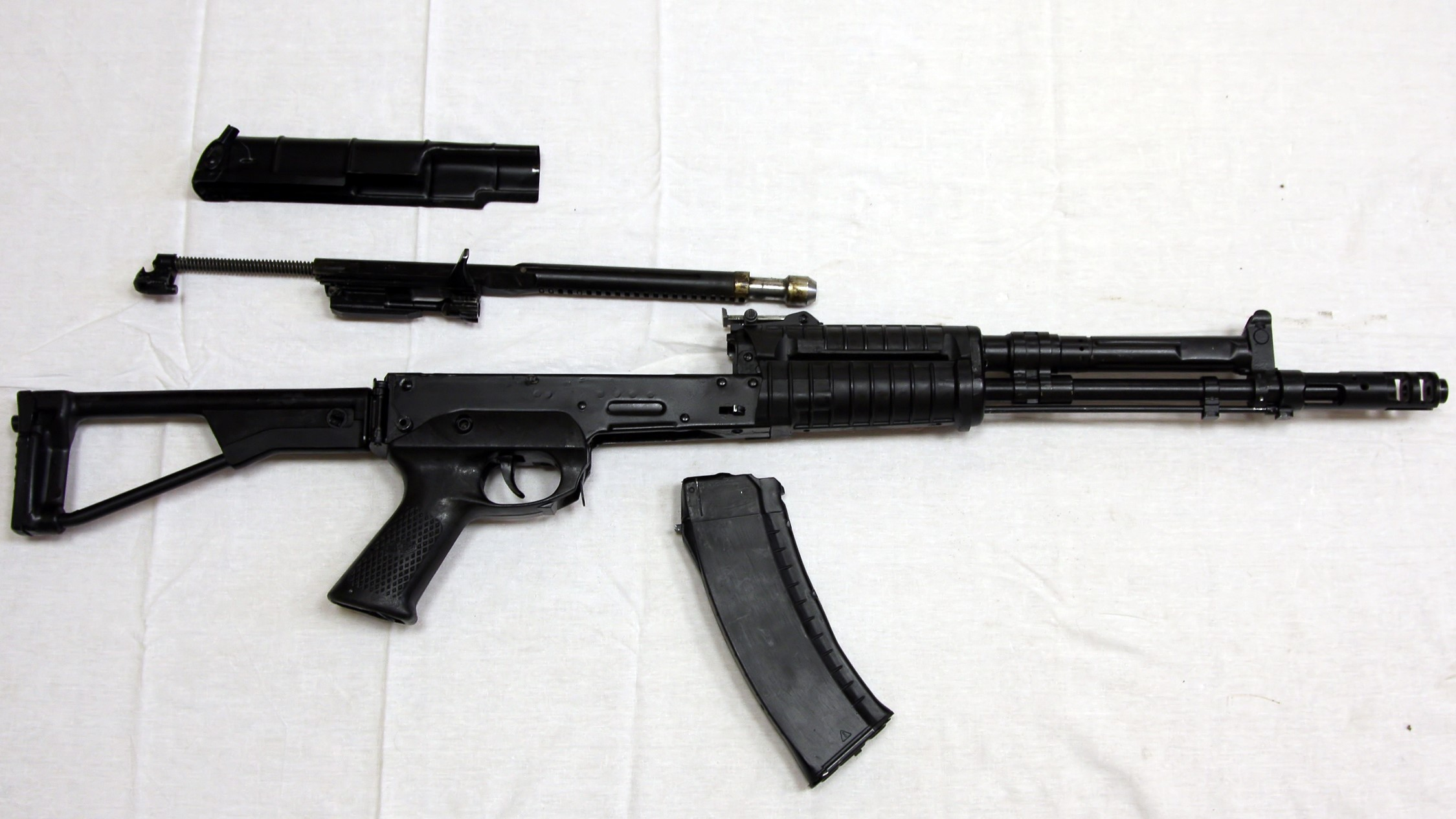
AEK-971 stripped down to its major components

The AEK-971 is based on previous AK-type rifles in internal design and layout, but features a Balanced Automatics Recoil System (BARS) that enhances the traditional Kalashnikov long stroke gas piston operating system by reducing the negative effects of recoil. Balanced recoil systems were previously applied in the AO-38 and AL-7 experimental assault rifles and in the AK-107, AK-108 and AK-109. BARS works by shifting mass toward the muzzle of the rifle as the bolt and bolt carrier recoil rearward by way of a counter-weight that negates the impulse of the gas piston and bolt carrier, resulting in more controllable automatic fire. For the AEK-971 automatic firing accuracy is improved by 15-20% in comparison with the AK-74M.

The AEK-971's iron sights features an adjustable notched rear tangent rear sight calibrated in 100 m (109 yd) increments from 100 to 1,000 m (109 to 1,094 yd) and a hooded front post. Each AEK assault rifle is fitted with a Warsaw Pact side-rail bracket for mounting optics.

The travel distance of the reciprocating parts of the AEK-971 is less than compared to the non-balanced recoil AK-pattern designs, thus increasing its cyclic rate of fire significantly. The original cyclic rate of fire of the prototype model was 1,500 rounds per minute and was later decreased to 900 rounds per minute for the production model.

The AEK-971 is fed through AK-74, RPK-74 pattern 5.45×39mm 30-round or larger box magazines.

== Variants ==
The AEK-971 has also been developed in 5.56×45mm NATO (AEK-972) and 7.62×39mm (AEK-973). The different variants are most easily recognised by their respective magazine curvatures. An improved variant of the AEK-971 has also been developed, designated as the AEK-973S.

Heavily improved variants of the AEK-971 and AEK-973 were later developed, designated as the 6P67 KORD and 6P68 KORD respectively, which are intended for use by the Russian special operations forces (Spetsnaz).

=== AEK-971 ===
The AEK-971 is chambered in 5.45×39mm cartridge, and serves as the basis for its variants. It uses the AK-74 and RPK-74 magazines.

=== AEK-972 ===
The AEK-972 is a variant chambered in 5.56×45mm NATO cartridge. It uses the magazines of the 5.56×45mm NATO chambered variants of the AK-100 rifle family; such as the AK-101, AK-102, and AK-108.

=== AEK-973 ===
The AEK-973 is a variant chambered in 7.62×39mm cartridge. It uses the AK-47, AKM and RPK magazines.

=== AEK-973S ===
The AEK-973S is an improved variant of the AEK-973, which features a new trigger mechanism that is located at the thumb safety-selector lever on the right-side and an extended padded retractable lightweight stock that is designed for the operator to still be able to fire the rifle even if it is retracted. The burst fire accuracy of the AEK-973S is said to be two times higher than that of the AKM.

=== 6P67 KORD ===
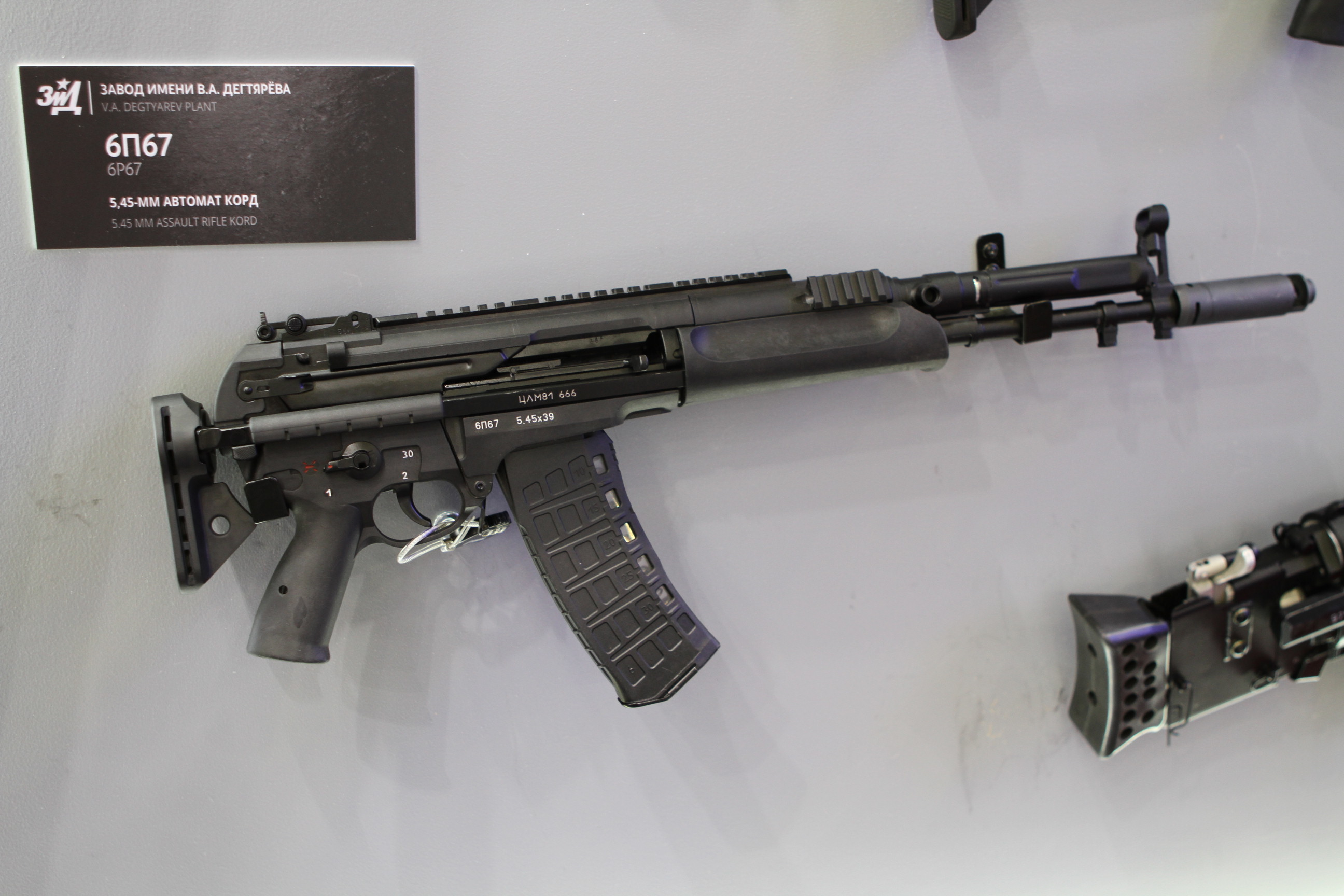
6P67 KORD with its stock retracted

The 6P67 KORD, also known as the A-545 during its developmental stage (official GRAU designation 6P67), is based on the AEK-971 and chambered in 5.45×39mm cartridge. It has numerous internal and external improvements over earlier AEK-971 models. The changes includes iron sights that consist of a rotary rear drum aperture and a hooded front post creating a significantly longer sight line, an ambidextrous fire mode selectors/safety levers, a 2-round burst feature, retractable and adjustable shoulder stock. Also the Warsaw Pact side-rail bracket is omitted and replaced by a Picatinny rail on a redesigned receiver top for mounting auxiliary equipment, such as optical red dot sights.

The first order for the 6P67 KORD was announced in mid-2020, followed by its adoption by the Russian Special Operations Forces in January 2022. It is believed that the order included approximately 500 units intended for Spetsnaz and the Russian Airborne Forces.

A variant equipped with a suppressor is known as the 6P67-1 KORD.

=== 6P68 KORD ===
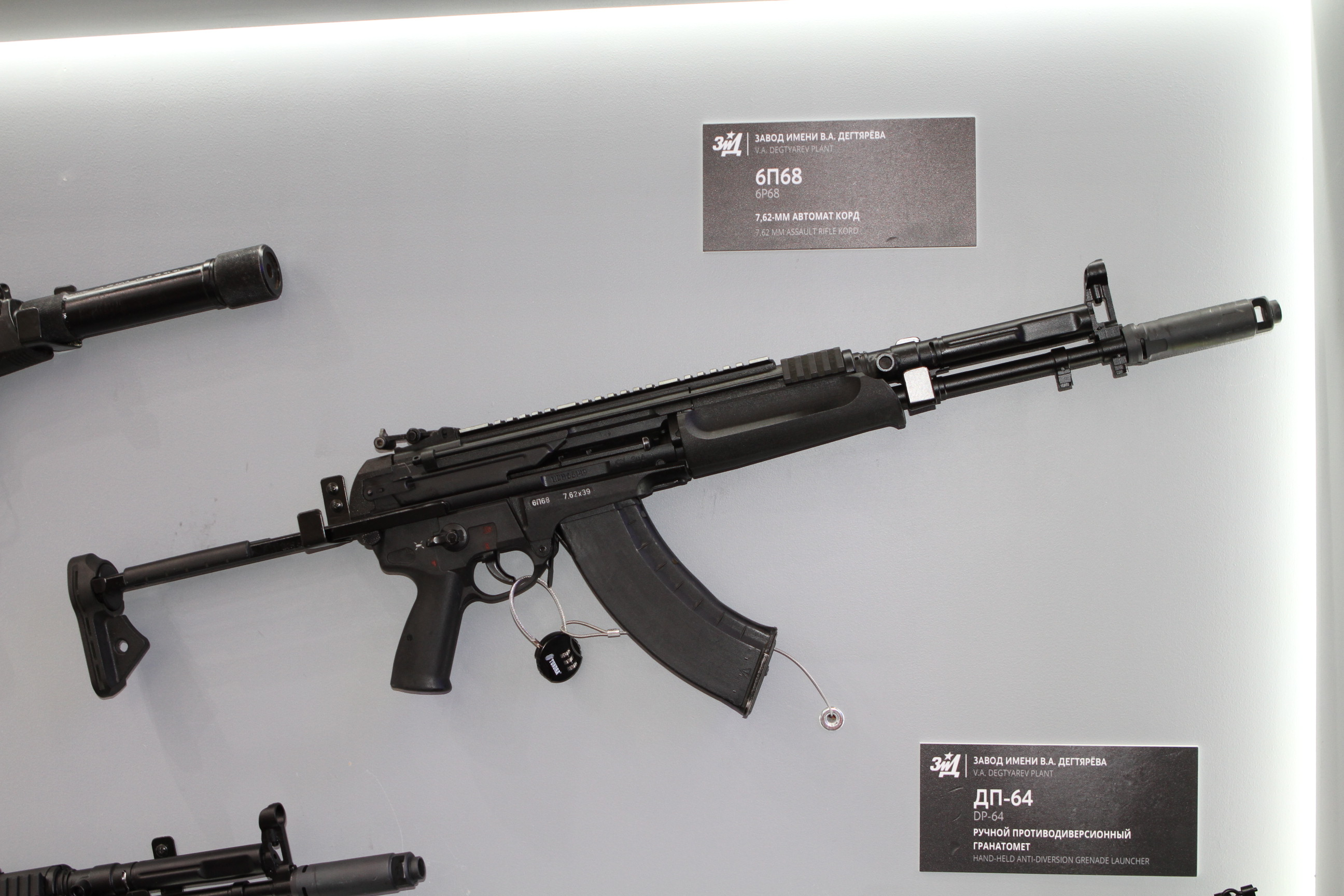
6P68 KORD with its stock deployed

The 6P68 KORD, also known as the A-762 during its developmental stage (official GRAU designation 6P68), is based on the AEK-973, evidently of similar design to the 6P67 KORD, but chambered in 7.62×39mm cartridge.

A variant equipped with a suppressor is also available, known as the 6P68-1 KORD.

== Users ==
- Russia: AEK-971s were produced in small batches and delivered to units of the MVD Internal Troops (paramilitary gendarmerie-like forces) and other law enforcement agencies of Russia. In January 2018, it was announced that the 6P67 KORD (5.45×39mm) and 6P68 KORD (7.62×39mm) had both been adopted by the Russian military. Serial production then began in April 2020.

== See also ==
- Knight's Armament Company LAMG
- SureFire MGX
- Ultimax 100
