= Saiga semi-automatic rifle =

Saiga Semi-Automatic Rifle
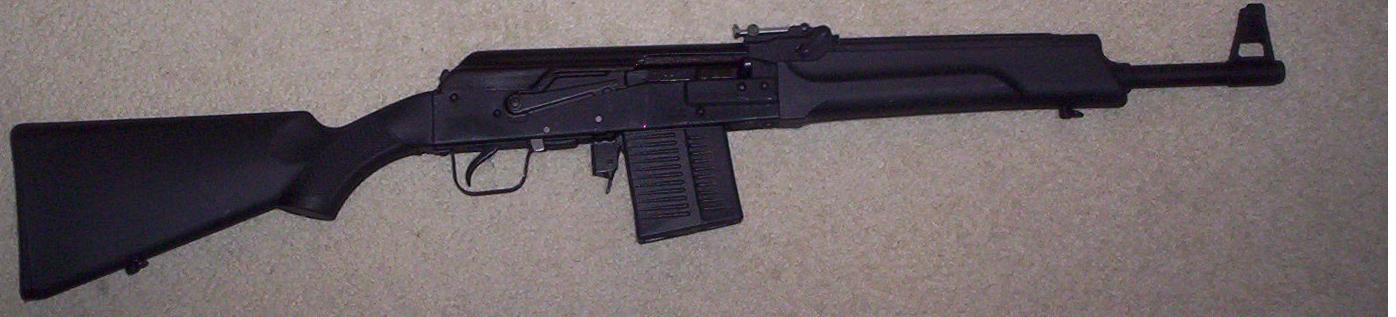
- The Saiga-308 rifle
- Type: Semi-automatic rifles
- Place of origin: Russia

Production history
- Designer: Mikhail Kalashnikov
- Designed: 1990s
- Manufacturer: Kalashnikov Concern (formerly Izhmash)
- Produced: 1990-present
- Variants: (based on the caliber of ammunition used): 7.62×39mm; 5.6×39mm; 5.45×39mm; .223 Remington/5.56×45mm; .308 Winchester/7.62×51mm; .30-06 Springfield; 9×53mmR

Specifications
- Mass: 3.6 kg (7.9 lb)
- Length: 900 mm (35 in)
- Barrel length: 415 mm (16.3 in)
- Width: 70 mm (2.8 in)
- Height: 220 mm (8.7 in)
- Action: Gas-operated, rotating bolt
- Effective firing range: 500 m (550 yd)
- Feed system: Magazine
- Sights: Iron "Leaf" sights

The Saiga semi-automatic rifles (/ˈsaɪɡə/, Saiga) (Russian: сайга, romanized: Sayga) are a family of Russian semi-automatic rifles manufactured by Kalashnikov Concern (formerly Izhmash), which also manufactures the original AK-47 and its variants, Saiga-12 shotguns and Dragunov sniper rifles. Saiga rifles are a sport version of the Kalashnikov rifle, and are marketed for hunting and civilian use. They are sometimes referred to as Saiga Sporters.

== History ==
Named after the Saiga Antelope, the Saiga series of rifles is based on the AK-47 weapon system originally designed by Mikhail Kalashnikov. The series was developed for shooters who wanted the reliability of an AK pattern rifle in a non-military package.

Originally designed in the 1970s, the first rifles were chambered for .220 Russian (5.6×39mm). The project was not a success and only about 300 rifles of this design were produced.

The Saiga was reintroduced in the 1990s and was marketed as a rifle that was capable of hunting medium-sized game. Improvements were added to the initial design from the 1970s which made the rifle capable of handling stronger cartridges such as the .308 Winchester/7.62×51mm and the more prevalent .223 Remington/5.56×45mm, 5.45×39mm, and 7.62×39mm calibers. These improvements contributed to the modern line of the Saiga rifles being adopted by various hunters.

The rifle is currently made in the Izhmash factory in the town of Izhevsk, the same plant that makes Kalashnikov military AKs. The Izhmash factory is the very place that Mikhail Kalashnikov worked at for a number of years.

== Description ==
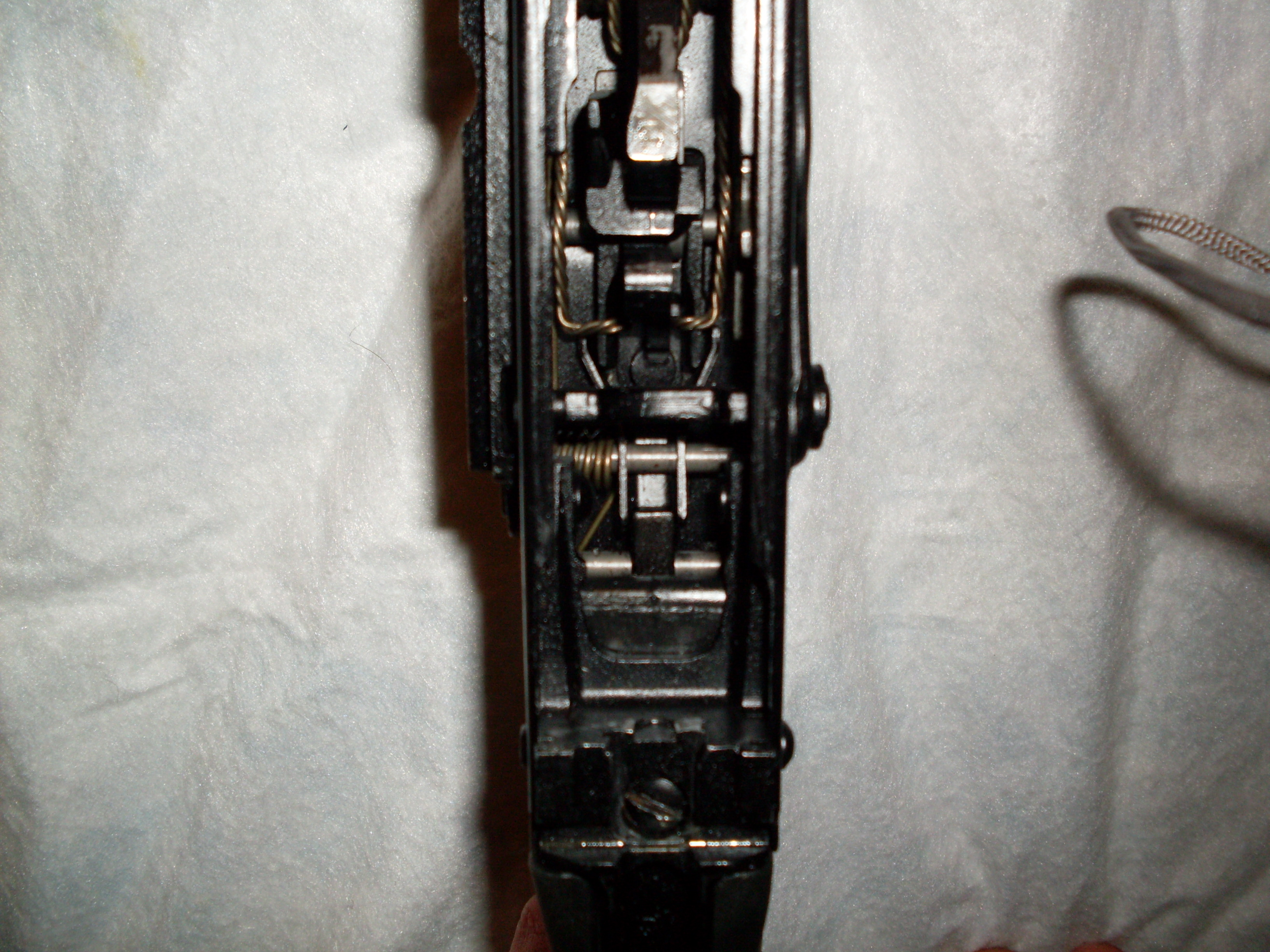
A closer look at the trigger mechanism of the Saiga.

The saiga most resembles an AK-74 and the AK-100 series of rifles. It includes a stamped receiver, and 90-degree gas block unlike the AK-47 which has a milled receiver and 45-degree gas block. The use of a third trunnion rivet gives it resemblance to the AK-100 series of rifles Russia is currently exporting. This rivet is not present on the AK-47, AKM, and AK-74. The bullet guide in these designs incorporate an extra appendage which allows the bolt to lock while this Saiga and AK-100's use a single rivet design. Most of the components of the Saiga are similar if not identical to an AK-101, but there are many cosmetic and functional differences between a Saiga and an AK series rifle. On the Saiga there is a pin that is used to secure the front hand guard onto the front barrel assembly and a screw which secures the hand guard in towards the rear. The 7.62×39 version Saiga is unable to accept standard AK magazines; physically the magazine catch will not allow a magazine to lock into place inside of the receiver. The Saiga's magazine catch has a smaller clearance between the receiver than a "normal" AK. This does not allow the larger lug of a non-Saiga magazine to lock in. The AK type magazines can be modified to lock in place, but cartridges may not feed because the Saiga's receiver lacks a bullet guide. The bullet guide allows a round to be pulled from a magazine and then fed into the chamber without being caught on the front trunnion; this bullet guide is specifically built on the lip of the Saiga magazine. Any magazine used that does not have this feature may not feed reliably in the rifle.

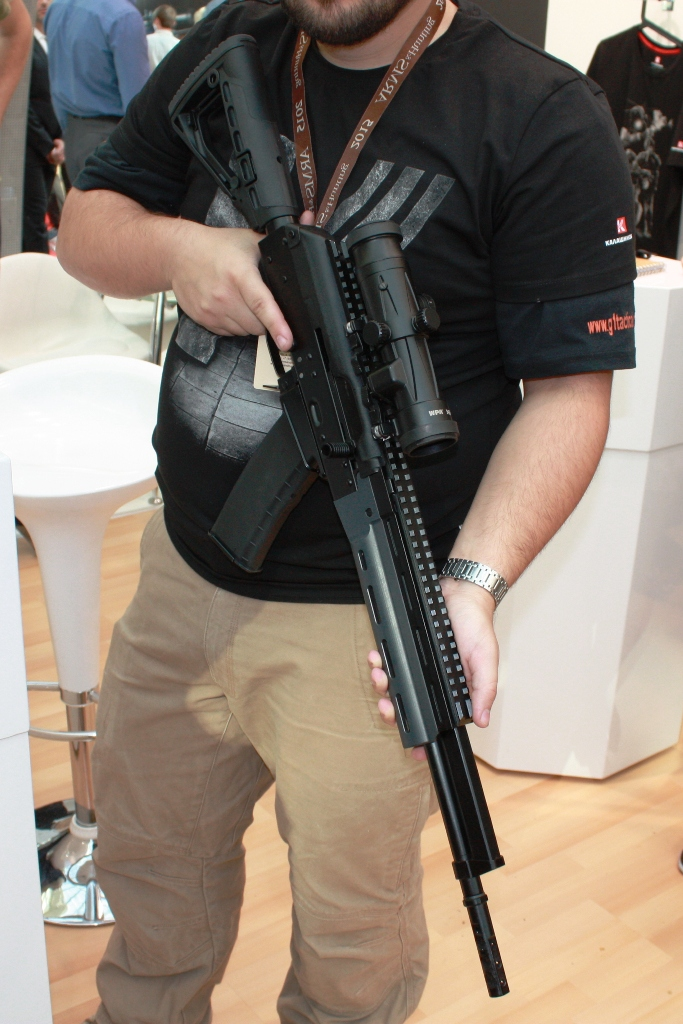
Saiga MK-107

Another difference of some later model Saigas is that they have a bolt hold open button. The Saiga bolt hold open is engaged by manually pressing a lever near the trigger guard and pulling the charging handle rearward although this feature does not automatically hold the rifle's action open after the last round is fired as seen on the AR-15. Most versions of the rifle lack a pistol grip and do not have a threaded front sight block, making it unable to accept muzzle devices. The trigger and trigger guard of most of the US versions are placed further back on the receiver than on a typical AK series rifle, and a transfer bar type system is used to release the hammer. This results in the Saiga having a considerably heavier and grittier trigger pull than that of other Kalashnikov-made firearms.

In March 2013, Izhmash debuted a civilian version of the AK-107/AK-108 rifle designated the Saiga MK-107. The MK-107 features improvements over the original AK-107 design including a rounded ergonomic charging handle, a button-style safety above the trigger guard, an AR-15-style pistol grip, a stock (made by Israeli firm CAA Tactical), and a full length top picatinny rail.

== Design and operation ==
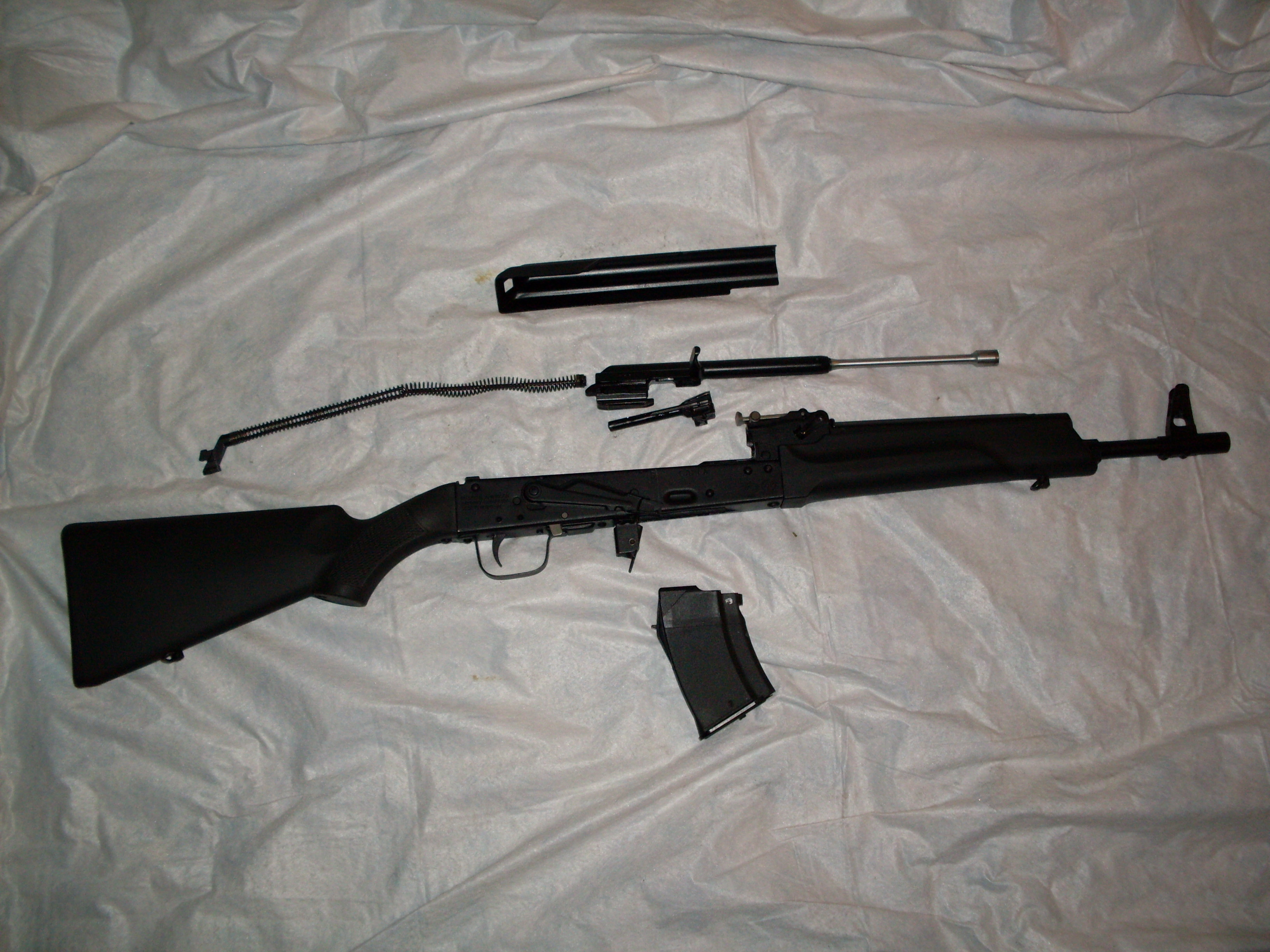
The Saiga 7.62×39 rifle disassembled. The charging handle is attached to the gas piston. Also the recoil spring and Saiga bolt are visible.

The Saiga uses the same type of gas system that the AK series rifle uses: Long-stroke piston. A piston is pushed by the force of the gases from the firearm when a round is discharged, and it keeps powder residue and carbon from impeding the action of the Saiga. It is widely accepted that this type of action provides greater reliability than most other semi-automatic actions. This piston is located inside the gas tube. As gas is siphoned into the gas tube, the gas piston is sent rearward. While the gas piston is sent rearward, the bolt, attached to the gas piston, is unlocked from the trunion and ejects the spent casing. When the bolt and gas piston reach the rearmost position of the receiver, the recoil spring pushes them forward again picking up a new round and chambers it, and the cycle repeats when the trigger is pulled.

Another key feature cited in the reliability of the Saiga is that the rifle is designed to have loose tolerances between moving parts. These loose tolerances allow more space between the moving parts of the rifle, and they let the rifle push any dirt and debris out of the way when the action cycles. All Saiga rifles have a hammer-forged chrome-lined barrel, which influences the Saiga's reliability by making the inside of the barrel more resilient to corrosion and enabling the rifle to withstand more rounds to be fired out of the barrel without an adverse effect on accuracy. This allows the firearms barrel to be cleaned easier than that of a non-chrome lined bore.

== Market ==
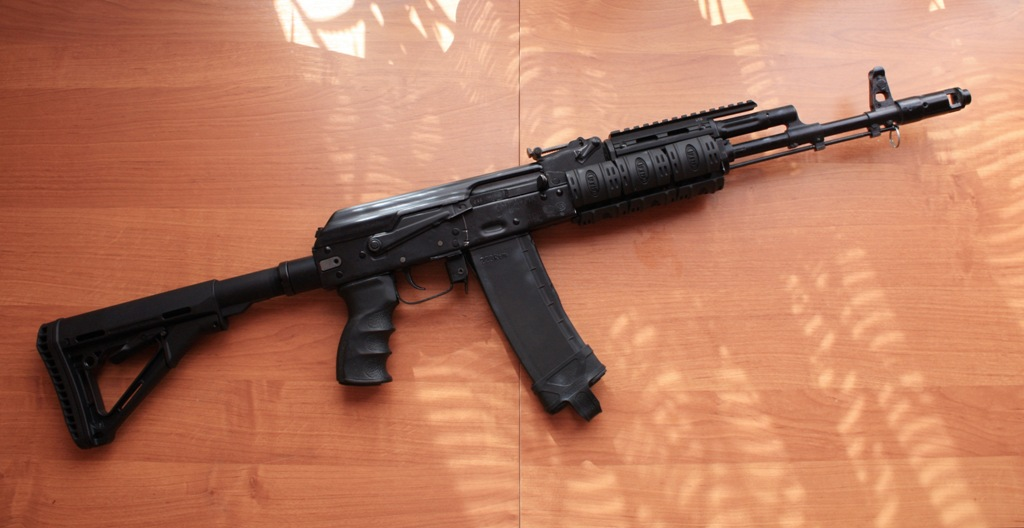
Saiga Mk .223 Rem "Tactical Edition"

Saigas were sometimes called "true" Kalashnikovs, since they were made under license in the same Kalashnikov Concern Izhmash factory where Mikhail Kalashnikov worked. Many Kalashnikov-pattern rifles produced in the world today are unlicensed.

=== In the United States ===
The Saiga line was initially exclusively imported into the United States by Russian American Armory and then Russian Weapons Company (RWC). Some rifles were imported by the FIME group (Arsenal) for conversion and resale under the Arsenal SGL line. On 16 July 2014, U.S. President Barack Obama signed an Executive Order banning the importation of Russian-made firearms (which include the Saiga) into the United States in response to the Russian invasion of Ukraine. RWC (originally from Tullytown, Pennsylvania) then changed their name to "Kalashnikov USA" and has started manufacturing their own AK-pattern rifles in Florida. Kalashnikov USA is now manufacturing the Saiga (now called the US132) and other Kalashnikov rifles in the United States, independently of the Kalashnikov Concern in Russia.

== See also ==
- Kalashnikov USA
- WASR-series rifles
- Zastava PAP series
- Saiga-12
- AK-101
- AK-103
- AK-104
- AK-74M
