= Burst mode (weapons) =

Automatic firing mode

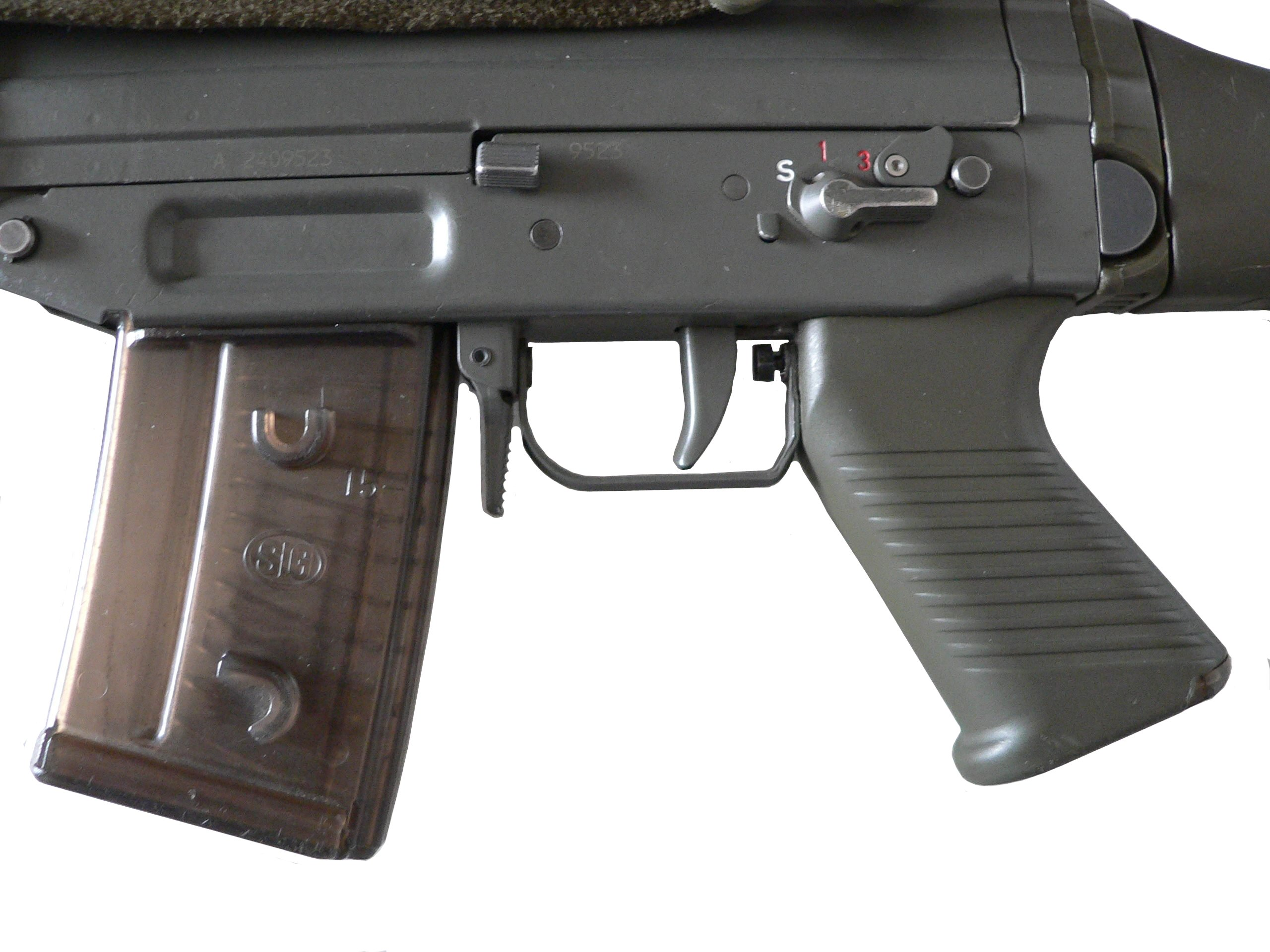
The firing selector of the SIG SG 550 allows for three-round bursts

In automatic firearms, burst mode or burst-fire is a firing mode enabling the shooter to fire a predetermined number of rounds, usually two or three rounds on handheld weapons to fifty or more rounds on autocannons, with a single pull of the trigger. This firing mode is commonly used in submachine guns and assault rifles. Other types of firearms, such as machine pistols, including the Heckler & Koch VP70 and Beretta 93R also have a burst mode.

The burst mode is normally employed as an intermediate fire mode between semi-automatic and fully automatic, although some firearms lack a "full auto" capability and use a burst mode instead. For instance, the M16A4 (the standard-issue service rifle of the USMC) has, in addition to the semi-automatic mode, a three-round burst mode, which replaced the fully automatic mode of the previous M16A1 and M16A3 models. The reason for this replacement was the massive waste of ammunition and very poor performance of soldiers who fired their rifles in fully automatic mode during the Vietnam War.

Some firearms, like the AN-94, A0-63, and the G11 rifles have a feature in which rounds are fired in quick succession. This increases the burst's accuracy, as multiple rounds are fired before the recoil impulse has affected the shooter's aim (before the impulse is even transferred to the shooter, in the case of the G-11).

== See also ==
- Auto sear
- Selective fire
- Bump stock, an accessory designed to help simulate full-automatic fire with a semi-automatic firearm
