= Nikonov =

Nikonov (Russian: Никонов) and Nikonova (Russian: Никонова) are masculine and feminine forms of a common Russian surname. Notable people with the surname include:

- Alexander Nikonov (1893–1937), a Soviet military leader
- Gennadiy Nikonov (1950–2003), a Russian gun engineer
- Pavel Nikonov (1930–2025), a Russian painter and graphic artist
- Vadim Nikonov (b. 1948), a Soviet football player and coach
- Vyacheslav Nikonov (b. 1956), a Russian political scientist
- Yevgeny Nikonov (1920–1941), a Russian war hero
- Angelina Nikonova (b. 1976), a Russian filmmaker, script writer and film producer
- Elena Nikonova, a Russian pair skater
- Matrona Nikonova (1881–1952), a canonized saint of the Russian Orthodox Church
- Ry Nikonova (1942–2014), Russian artist, poet, and writer
- Valentina Nikonova (b. 1952), a Soviet fencer
- Yevgeniya Nikonova (b. 1970), a Russian basketball player
