= Peter Andreevich Tkachev =

Russian weapons engineer

Peter Tkachev
- Occupation: Small arms designer
- Known for: Designer of the Balanced Automatic Recoil System (BARS)

Peter Andreevich Tkachev (Russian: Пётр Андреевич Ткачёв) was a Russian weapons engineer for TsNIITochMash. He is known to have worked on and modified various weapons such as the AO-38, AO-40, AO-46, AO-62 and AO-63 assault rifles as well as developing the Balanced Automatics Recoil System (BARS) used in the AK-107.
