= AO-63 assault rifle =

AO-63
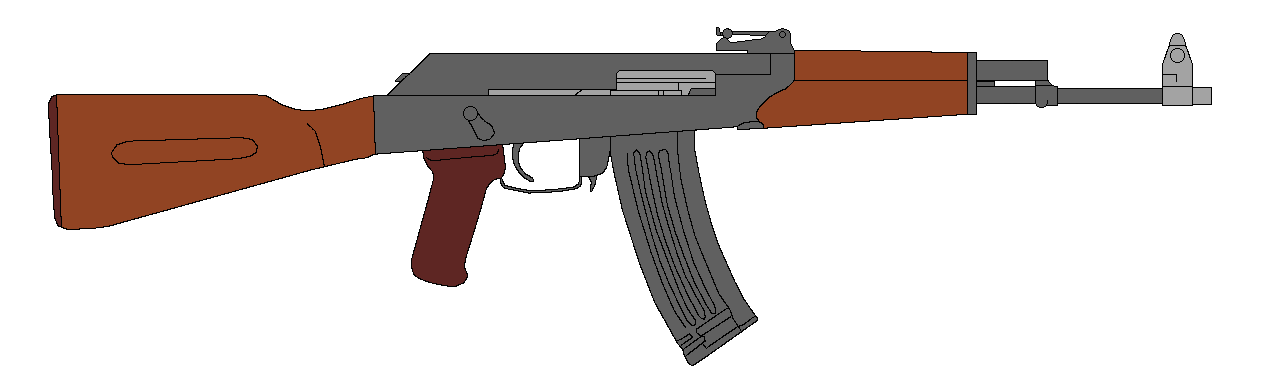
- Drawing of AO-63
- Type: Assault rifle
- Place of origin: Soviet Union

Production history
- Designer: Sergei Simonov, Peter Tkachev
- Designed: 1984
- Manufacturer: TsNIITochMash
- No. built: 1

Specifications
- Mass: 3.68 kg (8.1 lb)
- Length: 890 mm (35.0 in) (Standard)
- Barrel length: 430 mm (16.9 in)
- Cartridge: 5.45×39mm
- Action: Gas-operated
- Rate of fire: 850 rounds/min (Full-automatic); 6000 rounds/min (Burst mode)
- Effective firing range: 850 m (930 yd)
- Feed system: 45-round detachable two-column box magazine
- Sights: adjustable Iron sights

The AO-63 (Автомат АО-63) is a Soviet two-barrel AK derived assault rifle chambered for the 5.45×39mm round. It was designed by Sergei Simonov and Peter Tkachev, and manufactured by TsNIITochMash. It uses a side-by-side barrel configuration, and it can reach a maximum rate of fire of 6000 rounds/min when fired in two-round burst mode with a 0.01 second delay to increase ballistic performance, making it technically the fastest-firing rifle known.

== Development ==
The AO-63 assault rifle was used by the Spetsnaz during the Abakan trials in May/June 1986, in search of a more accurate alternative to replace the standard issue AK-74. It was described in the official report as being highly accurate as well as simple and reliable; despite its accuracy and performance, it was later dropped out of the competition for unknown reasons, with the AN-94 emerging victorious.

== Overview ==
The AO-63 is a gas-operated, 5.45×39mm caliber, twin-barrel assault rifle derived from the Kalashnikov rifle. The weapon has side-by-side barrels with the right barrel predominant, twin rotating bolts/gas pistons and ejects from both sides. The trigger group has a 3-position selector on the right side of the receiver; the first is semi-auto firing one barrel, the second in full auto firing both barrels with a 0.01 second delay, the third is unique as at first it fires a two-round 6000rpm burst then one barrel in 850rpm full auto. The magazine is unusual as it has the main double column holding 30 rounds with a single column holding 15 rounds.
