= Gennadiy Nikonov =

Russian firearm designer (1950–2003)

- Born: Gennadiy Nikolaevich Nikonov; 11 August 1950; Izhevsk, Russian SFSR, Soviet Union
- Died: 5 February 2003 (aged 52); Izhevsk, Russia
- Occupations: Inventor, engineer
- Spouse: Tatiana Nikonova

Gennadiy Nikolaevich Nikonov (Russian: Геннадий Николаевич Никонов; 11 August 1950 – 14 May 2003) was a Russian firearm engineer. Some of his accomplishments were as the designer of the AN-94 assault rifle, and the "straight-back bolt." Nikonov held 44 Copyright Certificates, and was awarded the titles of "The Best Designer of the Company" and "The Best Designer of the Ministry." In his memory there is a memorial plaque on the building design and weapons center of "Izhmash".

== Early life and education ==
Nikonov was born in Izhevsk. His father and mother were employed at Izhmash, a Soviet arms factory. His father was a mechanic. Nikonov graduated from technical school in 1968. At Izhmash, he took evening classes. In 1975 he graduated from the Izhevsk Mechanical Institute as a gun engineer.

== Design career ==
He started work at Izhmash in the Department of the Chief Arms Designer. His first position was as a technician. In technical school, Nikonov became obsessed with underwater rifles. He won his first professional recognition by designing a trigger mechanism for an underwater rifle.

He designed various rifles, including air guns and sporting firearms. One of the most praised was the stylish, accurate "Izjubr" (Buck Deer) carbine, a limited edition luxury weapon. Nikonov was appointed as a senior project engineer to design single-shot bolt-action rifles and fully automatic weapons. In this assignment he patented a number of mechanisms and components. One of the most significant was the "straight-pull bolt," first used in a winter biathlon target rifle.

Nikonov also worked on research projects. In the middle 1970s he entered a post-graduate Ph.D course. From 1980 to 1985 he worked on projects for the Soviet Ministry for Defense Industry. Examples of his innovation include a twin-barreled machine gun and the "blow back shifted pulse (BBSP)" used on the AN-94.

=== Nikonov machine gun ===
The weapon was developed on Nikonov's own initiative, from work connected with competitions and technical tasks. The weapon has no bolt, but a stationary breech and movable barrels, each with its own gas cylinders and pistons connected to the adjacent barrel. Upon firing one barrel, the next one is forced backwards, and thus causes the next barrel to move forward (a Gast gun principle). Firing operates a feeding device that channels rounds into the barrels, with the spent cartridges being ejected from both sides. The barrels move back and forth the full length of the cartridge. The double-barreled design, in combination with the shortest possible stroke, allows for a high rate of fire at more than 3,000 rounds per minute. The prototype is now in the M.T. Kalashnikov museum in Izhevsk.

== Personal life ==
He was married and had two sons.
