= TsNIITochMash =

Russian armament design bureau

Joint-stock Company “Central Scientific - Research Institute for Precision Machine Engineering”
- Native name: Акционерное общество «Центральный научно-исследовательский институт точного машиностроения»
- Romanized name: Aktsioneroye obshchestvo “Tsentralniy nauchno-issledovatelskiy institut tochnogo mashinostroyeniya”
- Type: Joint-stock company
- Industry: Arms industry
- Founded: 1944; 82 years ago
- Headquarters: Klimovsk, Russia
- Products: Firearms, ammunition, ATGMs, self-propelled artillery, mortar carriers, military vehicles
- Parent: Rostec
- Website: cniitm.ru

TsNIITochMash (Russian: ЦНИИТОЧМАШ) is a Russian industrial design bureau which is a major designer and producer of weapons for the Russian Armed Forces and National Guard. The name is an initialism for Central Scientific - Research Institute for Precision Machine Engineering (Центральный научно-исследовательский институт точного машиностроения).

TsNIITochMash determines the development of and develops small arms and simulators for them, individual field equipment, conducts R&D on control systems for precision-guided munitions (as well as protection against them), field artillery systems and new materials. It also develops most cartridges, from small arms up to 14.5×114mm, for the Russian Armed Forces.

== Main activities ==
Development and production of various types of small arms and ammunition, military equipment, mortar and artillery systems, optoelectronic devices, sports and hunting ammunition, sealed containers for transportation and storage, simulators of small arms. Various tests of small arms and cannon weapons.

An important area of activity is the development of precision weapons guidance equipment (PWGE). The Institute has developed control equipment for the first domestic portable and portable-mounted anti-tank complexes "Fagot", "Konkurs". The technical solutions found by the Institute are the basis for the control equipment of the anti-tank complexes "Metis" and others. The Institute is a developer, manufacturer and holder of patents for ground-based control equipment of an effective modern anti-tank complex "Kornet".

== Military products ==
- 9×21mm Gyurza SR-1M Gyurza pistol, cartridges: SP-10, SP-11
- 9×21mm Gyurza SR-2 Udav pistol, cartridges: SP-10, SP-11
- 9×21mm Gyurza SR-2 Veresk submachine gun, cartridges: SP-10, SP-11
- 9×39mm SR-3 Vikhr compact assault rifle, cartridges: SP-5, SP-6
- 9×39mm AS Val "special automatic rifle", cartridges: SP-5, SP-6
- 9×39mm VSS Vintorez "special sniper rifle", cartridges: SP-5, SP-6
- 7.62×42mm PSS silenced pistol, cartridge: SP-4
- 5.66×39mm APS underwater assault rifle, cartridges: MPS, MPST
- 4.5×40mmR SPP-1M underwater pistol, cartridges: SPS
- 7.62×54mmR PKP Pecheneg machine gun
- 9M113M SACLOS anti-tank missile
- 2S9 Nona self-propelled mortar
- Zauralets-D
- RDG-U smoke grenade
- Aerosol-forming ammunition
- Knut fire simulator

== Civil products ==
Aerosol complex "Jasmine" for temporary neutralization of biological objects. It consists of an "Udar M" device complete with pyromechanical cans "BAMP-5 (OS)".

== Concepts ==
- 5.45×39mm AL-7 assault rifle
- 5.45×39mm AO-63 assault rifle

== Services ==
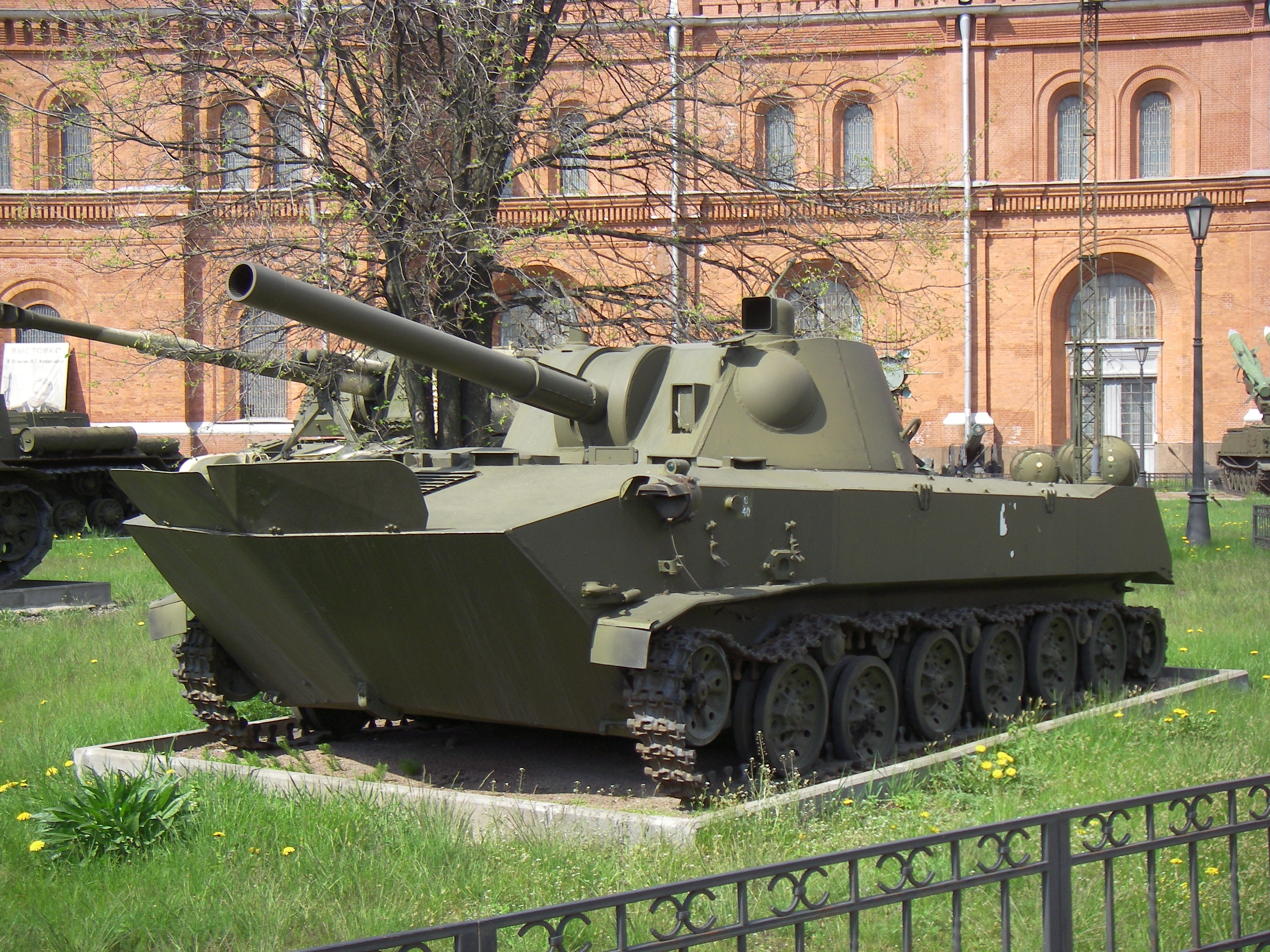
2S9 Nona-SVK

- State Demonstration-Test Center – SDTC
- Ordnance upgrade program for 120mm self-propelled mortars – Nona-SVK, and 2S31 Vena

== Awards ==
- Order of the October Revolution

== Administration ==
- Main Pavel Ivanovich (1944-1946)
- Rudnev Konstantin Nikolaevich (1946-1948)
- Novikov Vladimir Nikolaevich (1948-1953)
- Medvedev Sergey Kirillovich (1953-1954)
- Rozanov Sergey Sergeevich (1954-1963)
- Sabelnikov Viktor Maksimovich (1963-1992)
- Khinikadze Alexandr Valeryanovich (1992-2000)
- Ivanov Vladimir Nikolaevich (2000-2012)
- Semizorov Dmitry Yuryevich (2012-2018)
- Bakov Albert Vladimirovich (2018-2021)
- Morozov Oleg Stepanovich (2021-2023)
- Semenyako Anton Ivanovich (since July 2023)

== See also ==
- List of Russian weaponry
- TsNIIMash
