= AN-94 =

Assault rifle

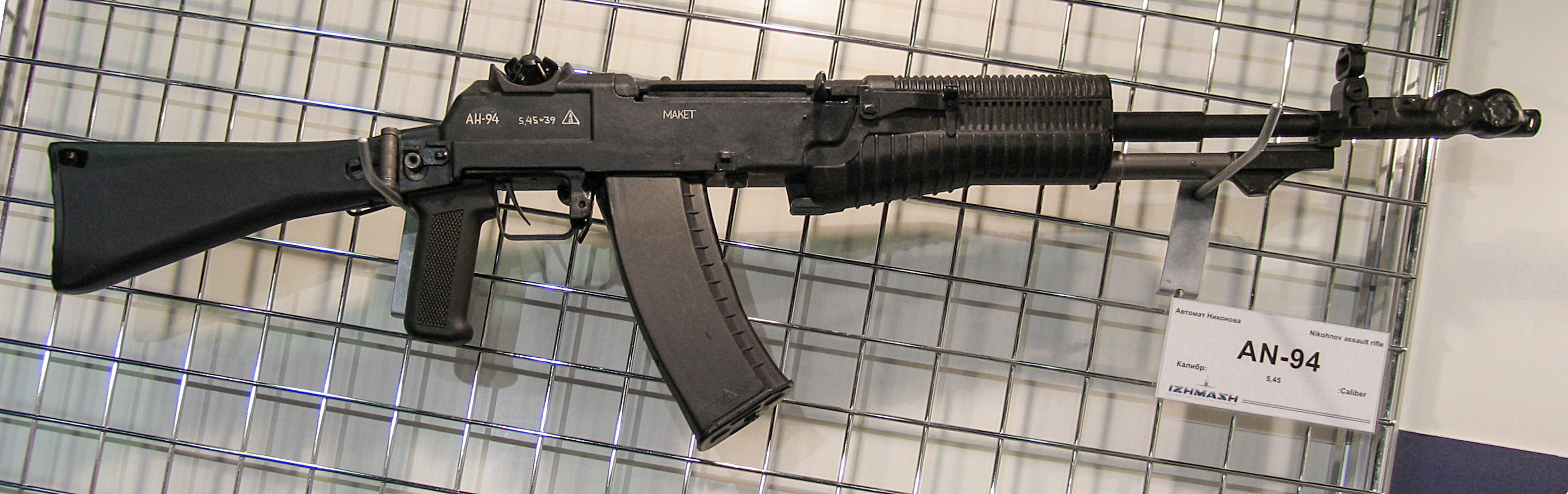
- AN-94 displayed at Engineering Technologies 2012
- Type: Assault rifle
- Place of origin: Russia

Service history
- In service: 1994–present
- Used by: See Users
- Wars: First Chechen War; Annexation of Crimea

Production history
- Designer: Gennadiy Nikonov
- Designed: 1980–1994
- Manufacturer: Kalashnikov Concern (formerly known as Izhmash)
- Produced: 1994–2006

Specifications
- Mass: 3.85 kg (8.49 lb); 728 mm (28.7 in) stock folded
- Barrel length: 405 mm (15.9 in)
- Cartridge: 5.45×39mm
- Action: Blowback shifted pulse, pulley system: Gas-operated for the first shot, Recoil operation for the second shot
- Rate of fire: 1800 (2-round burst) or 600 (fully automatic) rounds/min
- Muzzle velocity: 900 m/s (2,953 ft/s)
- Effective firing range: 800 m (870 yd)
- Feed system: 30, 45 round AK-74 compatible box magazines; 60-round casket magazines
- Sights: Iron sights; 700 mm (27.6 in) sight radius, various optics (optional)

The AN-94 (Russian: 5,45-мм автомат Никонова обр. 1987 г. / АН-94 «Абака́н», GRAU designation 6P33) is a Russian assault rifle. The initials stand for Avtomat Nikonova model of 1994, after its chief designer Gennadiy Nikonov, who previously worked on the Nikonov machine gun. The name Абака́н refers to the Siberian city of Abakan.

The AN-94 was designed as a potential replacement to the AK-74 series of rifles currently in service with the Russian Armed Forces. Due to its complex design and expense, it failed to fill its intended role as a replacement for the AK-74, but it is in limited use as a special purpose weapon.

The AN-94 has the unique feature of delaying felt recoil for the first two rounds. This increases hit probability in adverse combat conditions. The AN-94 offers a unique two-shot burst function at a stated 1800 rounds per minute, with the second shot firing very close to the first round. This feature is often known as the "hyperburst" mechanism.

== Design and operation ==
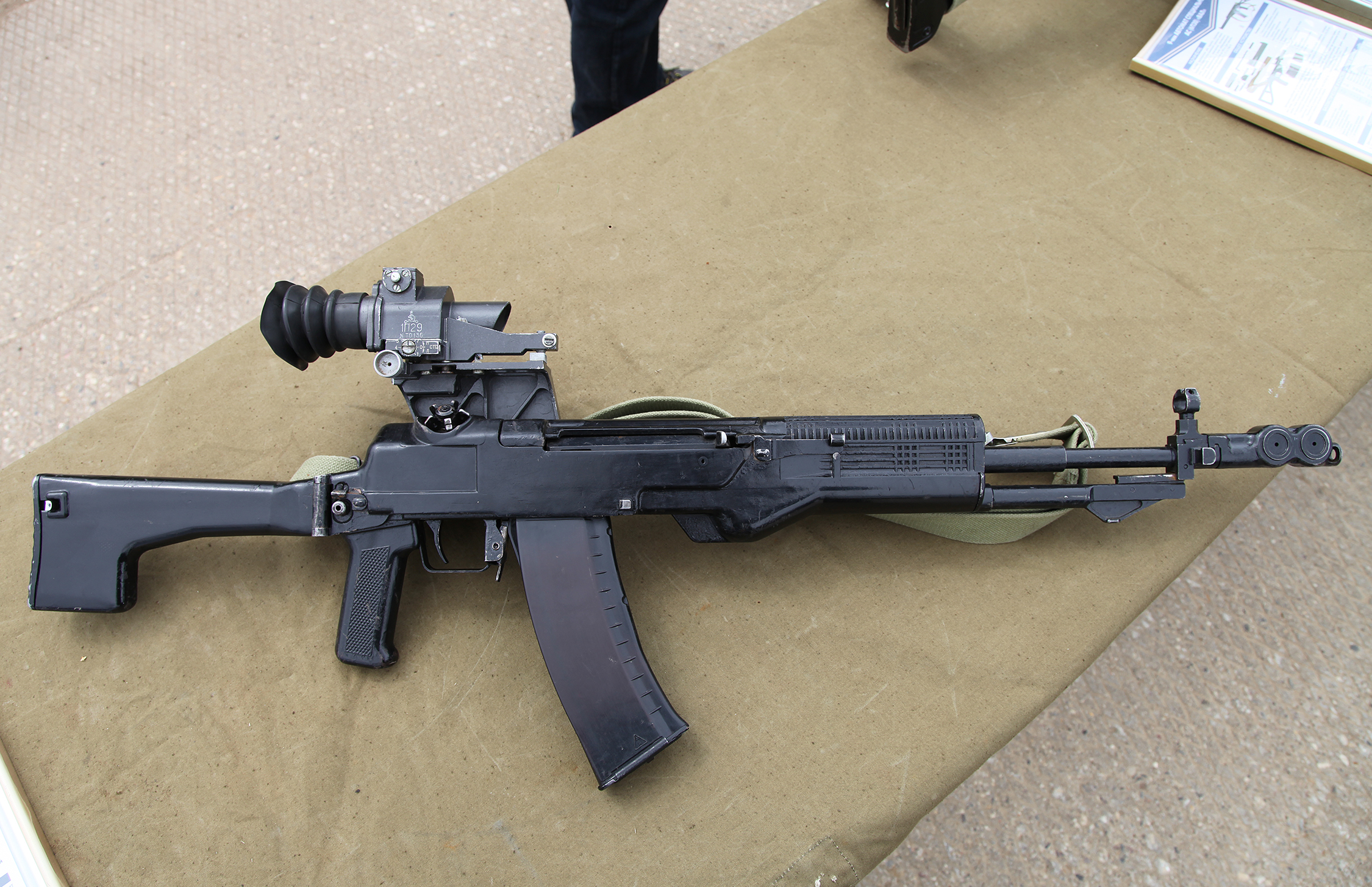
Prototype of AN-94 assault rifle, also known as LI-291

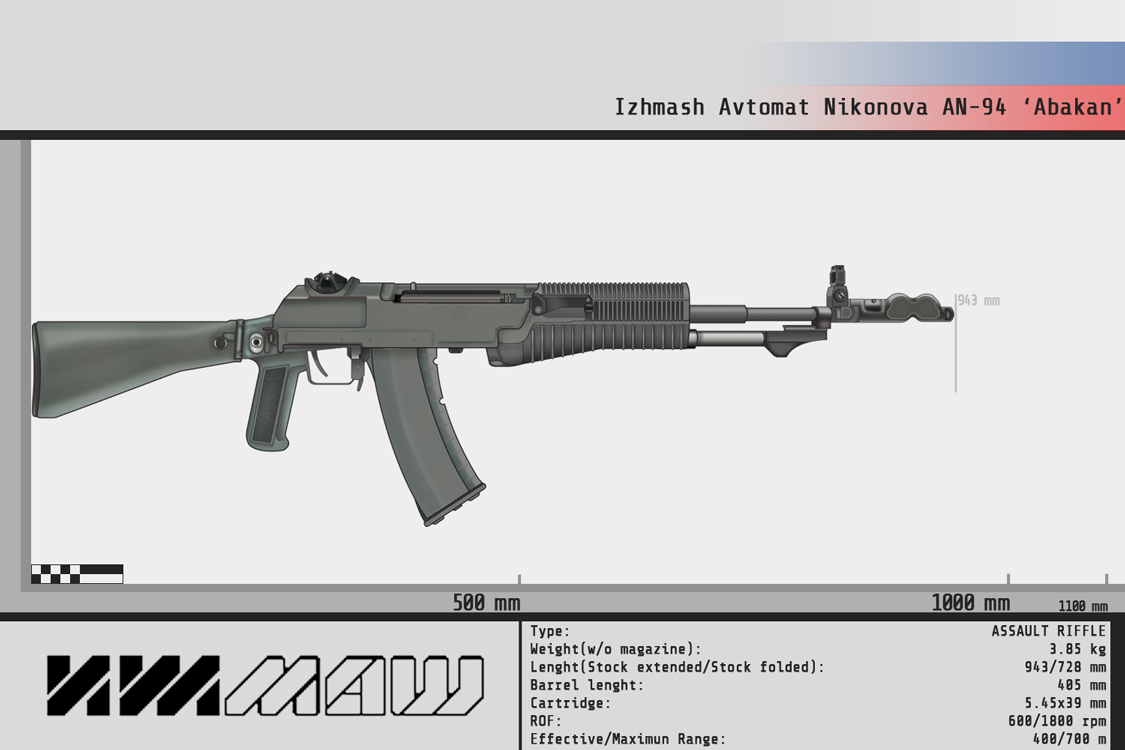
AN-94 infographics

The most conspicuous identifying feature of the AN-94 is its magazine, which is canted several degrees to the right of center (when viewed from a firing position). This design feature is necessary to accommodate the unique ammunition feed mechanism. The AN-94 is chambered in the same 5.45×39mm M74 cartridge as the AK-74, and it utilizes a rotating bolt to lock the action. Gennadiy Nikonov and his engineers used the Russian term смещенный импульс свободного затвора (smeschennyi impuls svobodnogo zatvora) to describe the rifle's method of operation, meaning "recoil shifted pulse". The AN-94 was made to fire in semi and full-auto.

When a round is fired, residual energy from the propellant charge in the cartridge acts upon the safely locked breech and bolt carrier. Simultaneously, a quantity of powder gases driving the bullet through the barrel is trapped and acts upon the piston in the gas tube located above and parallel to the barrel. The movement of the piston and its connecting rod acts upon the locking bolt, causing it to rotate and allow the breech to safely open. This initiates the extraction and ejection cycle for the first spent cartridge. After the first round has been fired, the bolt and carrier group move toward the rear, ejecting the first casing towards the front of the ejection window. The movement of the Carrier is directly connected to a pulley system which is connected to a small metal rod on the rear side of the magazine well. The rod pushes a second round into the firing position.

Once this action is completed, the bolt and carrier group will stop and move back towards the front of the gun before it has hit the rear of the receiver. When the bolt has fully locked it will fire the second round. This whole process happens very quickly, and it is how the 2 round burst works. For any follow-up rounds, the hammer – in fact a horizontal striker, as opposed to the rotating hammer of the AK rifle – is held until every full recoil cycle is finished, to prevent the rifle firing at the extremely high rate continuously. This means that after every bullet the bolt and carrier group will travel the whole distance of possible travel, resulting in a more manageable rate of 600 RPM.

== Service history ==
Production is estimated to have been between 2,000 and 2,500, according to Jonathan Ferguson, a British firearms historian and Keeper of Firearms and Artillery at the Royal Armouries Museum.

At least one was carried by Russian troops carrying out the 2014 Russian occupation of Crimea. They have also been used by Russian troops deployed in Chechnya and Dagestan.

== Users ==
- Kyrgyzstan: 60 AN-94s received as part of a Russian aid package in 2012.
- Russia: Used in limited numbers by the Russian Army, Police, Federal Security Service, Ministry of Internal Affairs; paratroopers and naval infantry.

=== Non-state actors ===
- Provisional Irish Republican Army: The IRA reportedly imported 20 examples in late 2001.

== See also ==
- Heckler & Koch G11
