= 5.45×39mm =

Soviet rimless intermediate cartridge

5.45×39 mm
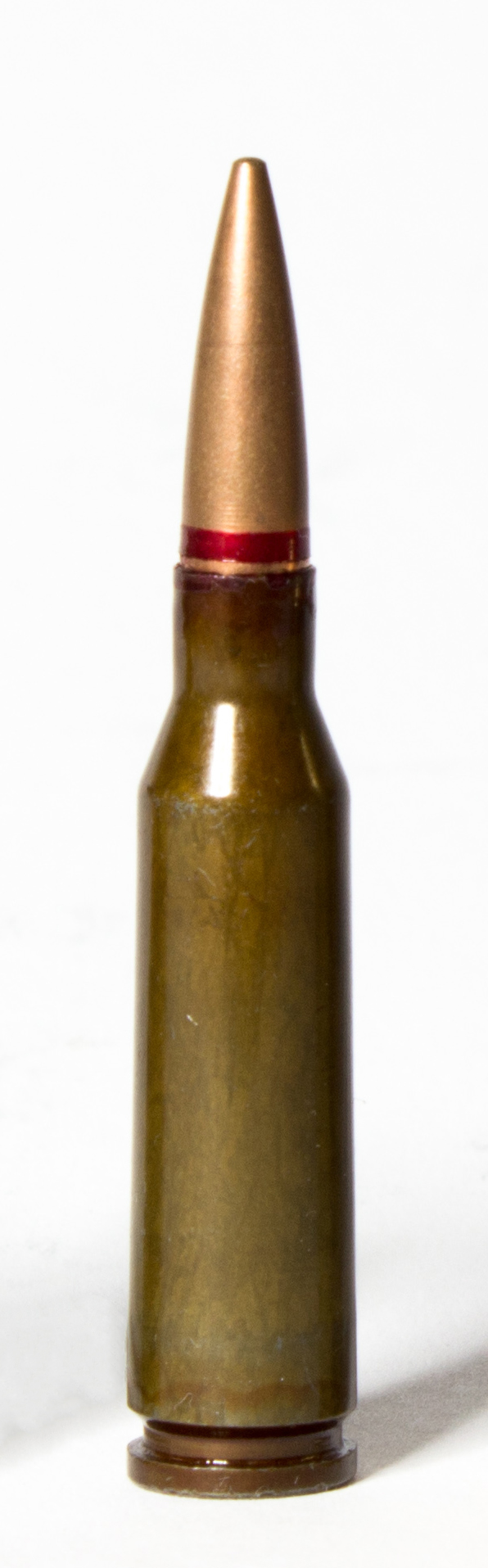
- 5.45×39 mm cartridge
- Type: Rifle
- Place of origin: Soviet Union

Service history
- In service: 1974–present
- Used by: Soviet Union/Russian Federation, former Soviet republics, former Warsaw Pact
- Wars: Afghan War, Georgian Civil War, First Chechen War, Second Chechen War, Yugoslav Wars, War in Afghanistan (2001–2021), Syrian Civil War, 2020 Nagorno-Karabakh conflict, Russian invasion of Ukraine

Production history
- Designed: early 1970s
- Variants: 5.45×39mm PSP

Specifications
- Case type: Rimless, bottleneck
- Bullet diameter: 5.60 mm (0.220 in)
- Land diameter: 5.40 mm (0.213 in)
- Neck diameter: 6.29 mm (0.248 in)
- Shoulder diameter: 9.25 mm (0.364 in)
- Base diameter: 10.00 mm (0.394 in)
- Rim diameter: 10.00 mm (0.394 in)
- Rim thickness: 1.50 mm (0.059 in)
- Case length: 39.82 mm (1.568 in)
- Overall length: 57.00 mm (2.244 in)
- Case capacity: 1.75 cm^{3} (27.0 gr H_{2}O)
- Rifling twist: 255 mm (1 in 10 inch) or 200 mm (1 in 7.87 inch)
- Primer type: Berdan or Small rifle
- Maximum pressure: 355.00 MPa (51,488 psi)

Ballistic performance
Bullet mass/type	Velocity	Energy
3.43 g (53 gr) 7N6 FMJ mild steel core	880 m/s (2,900 ft/s)	1,328 J (979 ft⋅lbf)
3.43 g (53 gr) 7N6M FMJ hardened steel core	880 m/s (2,900 ft/s)	1,328 J (979 ft⋅lbf)
3.62 g (56 gr) 7N10 FMJ enhanced penetration	880 m/s (2,900 ft/s)	1,402 J (1,034 ft⋅lbf)
3.69 g (57 gr) 7N22 AP hardened steel core	890 m/s (2,900 ft/s)	1,461 J (1,078 ft⋅lbf)
5.2 g (80 gr) 7U1 subsonic for silenced AKS-74UB	303 m/s (990 ft/s)	239 J (176 ft⋅lbf)
- Test barrel length: 415 mm (16.3 in) and 200 mm (7.9 in) for 7U1; Source

The 5.45×39 mm cartridge is a rimless bottlenecked intermediate cartridge. It was introduced into service in 1974 by the Soviet Union for use with the new AK-74. The 5.45×39 mm gradually supplemented and then largely replaced the 7.62×39mm cartridge in Soviet and Warsaw Pact service as the primary military service rifle cartridge. This change was made in order to compete with the American 5.56×45mm NATO for a light, flat shooting round.

== History ==
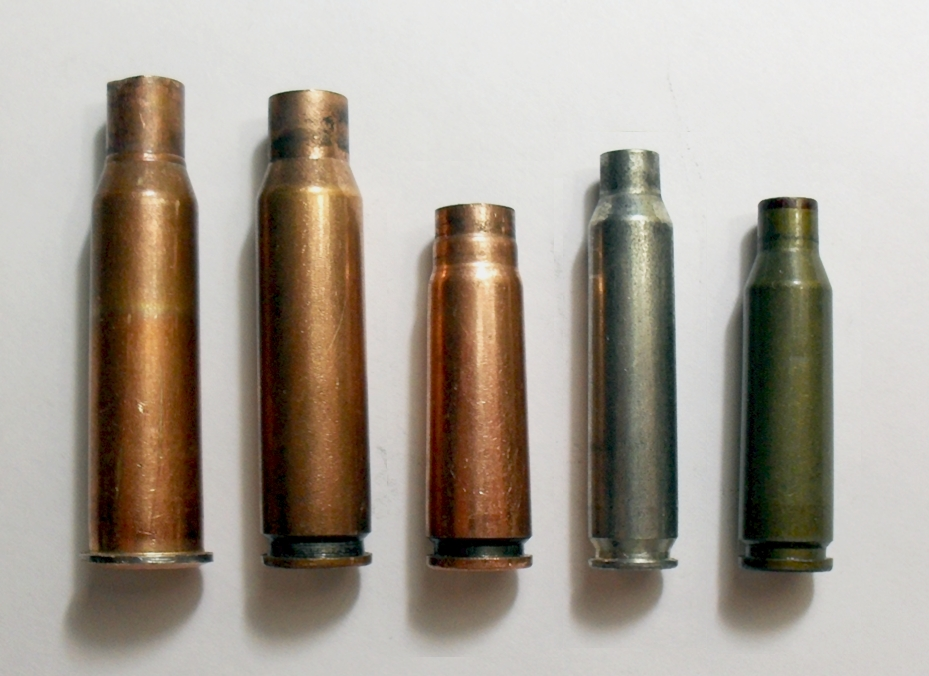
Service rifle cartridge cases: (Left to right) 7.62×54mmR, 7.62×51mm NATO, 7.62×39mm, 5.56×45mm NATO, 5.45×39 mm.

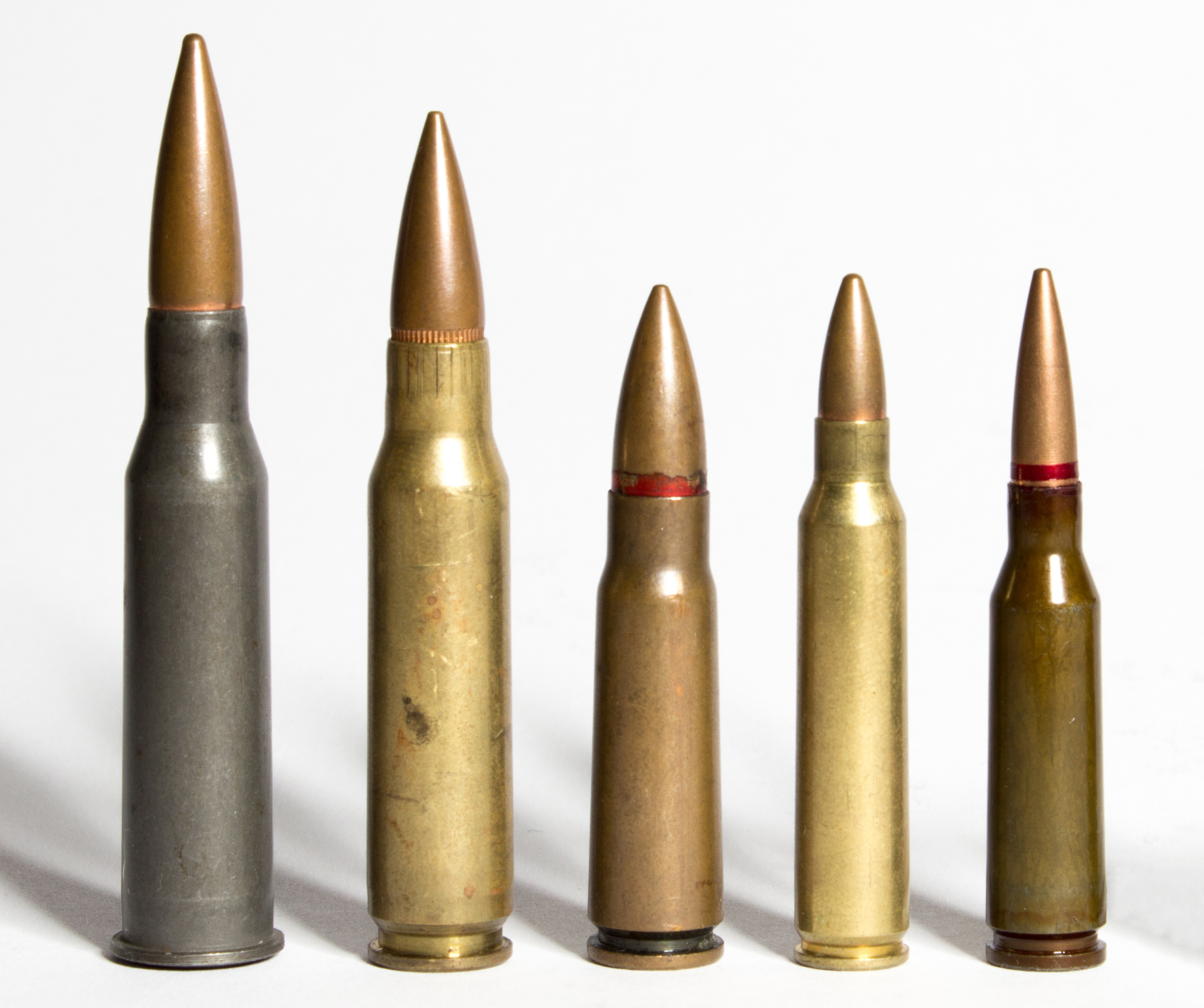
Service rifle cartridges loaded with projectiles: (Left to right) 7.62×54mmR, 7.62×51mm NATO, 7.62×39mm, 5.56×45mm NATO, 5.45×39mm.

The 5.45×39 mm cartridge was developed in the early 1970s by a group of Soviet designers and engineers under the direction of M. Sabelnikov. Further group members were: L. I. Bulavsky, B. B. Semin, M. E. Fedorov, P. F. Sazonov, V. Volkov, V. A. Nikolaev, E. E. Zimin and P. S. Korolev. The 5.45×39 mm couples a sensible case volume (1.75 ml) to bore area (23.99 mm^{2}/0.2399 cm^{2}) ratio with ample space for loading relatively long slender projectiles that can provide good aerodynamic efficiency and external ballistic performance for the projectile diameter.

The 5.45×39 mm is an example of an international tendency towards relatively small-sized, lightweight, high-velocity military service cartridges. Cartridges like the 5.45×39 mm, 5.56×45mm NATO and Chinese 5.8×42mm allow a soldier to carry more ammunition for the same weight compared to their larger and heavier predecessor cartridges, have favourable maximum point-blank range or "battle zero" characteristics and produce relatively low bolt thrust and free recoil impulse, favouring lightweight arms design and automatic fire accuracy.

The Soviet original military issue 7N6 cartridge variant introduced in 1974 is loaded with full metal jacket bullets that have a somewhat complex construction. The 3.43 g (52.9 gr) 25.55 mm (1.01 in) long boat-tail projectile's jacket is clad in gilding metal. The unhardened 1.43 g (22.1 gr) steel (steel 10) rod penetrator core is covered by a thin lead inlay which does not fill the entire point end, leaving a hollow cavity inside the nose. The bullet is cut to length during the manufacturing process to give the correct weight. The 7N6 uses a boat-tail design to reduce drag and there is a small lead plug crimped in place in the base of the bullet. The lead plug, in combination with the air space at the point of the bullet, has the effect of moving the bullet's center of gravity to the rear; the hollow air space also makes the bullet's point prone to deformation when the bullet strikes anything solid, inducing yaw. The brown-lacquered steel case is Berdan primed. Its 39.37 mm (1.55 in) length makes it slightly longer than the 7.62×39 mm case which measures exactly 38.60 mm (1.52 in). The primer has a copper cup and is sealed with a heavy red lacquer. The propellant charge is a ball powder with similar burning characteristics to the WC844 powder used in 5.56×45mm NATO ammunition. The 7N6 cartridge weight is 10.75 g (165.9 gr).

Tests indicate the free recoil energy delivered by the 5.45×39 mm AK-74 assault rifle is 3.39 J (2.50 ft⋅lb), compared to 6.44 J (4.75 ft⋅lb) delivered by the 5.56×45 mm NATO in the M16 assault rifle and 7.19 J (5.30 ft⋅lb) delivered by the 7.62×39 mm in the AKM assault rifle.

Military 5.45×39 mm ammunition was produced in the former Soviet Union, and in the GDR, and is produced in Bulgaria, Poland and Romania. In the former Soviet Union this ammunition is produced in Russia, Armenia, and Azerbaijan. Ukraine used to produce Soviet small arms ammunition before the Russians took over the Luhansk Cartridge Plant in 2014, but managed to resume production of 5.45×39 mm in 2024 and start producing 5.56×45 mm NATO ammunition as well. Kazakhstan plans on producing several types of small arms ammunition including the 5.45×39 mm, with mass production expected to begin in 2024.

=== Use in the Soviet-Afghan War ===
When the AK-74 saw service during the Soviet-Afghan War, the original 5.45×39 mm 7N6 ball round quickly became known amongst the Afghan mujahideen as the "poison bullet": it caused more damage to internal tissue and organs in comparison to the 7.62×39 mm round used by the AK-47 and AKM (thanks to tumbling caused by the air space in the tip). Wounded fighters, often left untreated for days coupled with a severe shortage of antibiotics, quickly developed infections including gangrene, leading the mujahideen to mistakenly believe that the Soviets made use of poisoned bullets. (Note: Erroneously referred by Rottman as the 5N7)

=== Use in Russo-Ukrainian War ===
During April 2024 of the Russo-Ukrainian War, Ukrainian forces used predominately 5.45×39 mm ammunition according to American national Jonathan Poquette, a member of the Chosen Company, attached to the Ukrainian 59th Motorized Brigade. He cited a number of reasons, firstly an unorganised donation of rifles that fired NATO standard 5.56×45mm NATO. Some units received these weapons, others did not. Secondly, the donation of 5.56×45 mm NATO ammunition recently along with other aid from the West was lacking. The third reason is the fact that Ukraine was part of the Soviet Union, meaning that weapons firing 5.45×39 mm ammunition were more widely available. Further, Russian forces use it as their standard ammunition. Saying that "if you go and you attack a Russian position and you need to resupply, the Russians are usually going to have 5.45×39 mm."

== Cartridge dimensions ==
The 5.45×39 mm has a 1.75 mL (27 gr H_{2}O) cartridge case capacity.

5.45×39 mm maximum C.I.P. cartridge dimensions.

Americans would define the shoulder angle at α/2 ≈ 20.3°. The common rifling twist rate for this cartridge is 255 mm (1 in 10 inches), 4 grooves, Ø lands = 5.40 mm, Ø grooves = 5.60 mm, land width = 2.60 mm and the primer type is either berdan or small rifle.

According to the official C.I.P. (Commission Internationale Permanente pour l'Epreuve des Armes à Feu Portatives) rulings the 5.45×39 mm can handle up to 355.00 MPa (51,488 psi) P_{max} piezo pressure. In C.I.P. regulated countries every rifle cartridge combo has to be proofed at 125% of this maximum C.I.P. pressure to certify for sale to consumers. This means that 5.45×39 mm chambered arms in C.I.P. regulated countries are currently (2014) proof tested at 443.80 MPa (64,368 psi) PE piezo pressure.

== Wounding effects ==
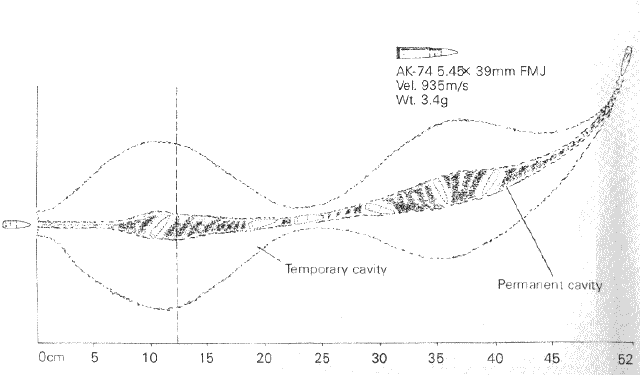
AK-74 5.45×39mm wound ballistics

Early ballistics tests demonstrated a pronounced tumbling effect with high speed cameras. Some Western authorities believed this bullet was designed to tumble in flesh to increase wounding potential. At the time, it was believed that yawing and cavitation of projectiles were primarily responsible for tissue damage. The tumbling effect was caused by the hollow point of the bullet - as the bullet strikes a target, the core inside the bullet flies forward, shifting the center of gravity and causing the bullet to tumble. Martin Fackler conducted a study with an AK-74 assault rifle using live pigs and ballistic gelatin: "The result of our preset test indicate that the AK-74 bullet acts in the manner expected of a full-metal-cased military ammunition—it does not expand or fragment when striking soft tissues". Multiple x-rays done on human tissue support this assertion. The average frequency of fragmentation with 7N6 fired into extremities with injuries was 18%. This is compared to 57% with M193 5.56×45 in the same testing. Fragmentation of 5.45 mm bullets was observed predominantly in wounds of the lower extremities with fractures of long bones. Most organs and tissue were too flexible to be severely damaged by the temporary cavity effect caused by yaw and cavitation of a projectile. With the 5.45 mm bullet, tumbling produced a temporary cavity twice, at depths of 100 mm (3.9 in) and 350 mm (13.8 in). This is similar to (but more rapid than) modern 7.62×39mm ammunition and to (non-fragmenting) 5.56 mm ammunition.

Military 5.45×39 mm rounds offer better penetration over (fragmenting) military 5.56×45 mm NATO rounds.

=== Terminal ballistics against body armor ===
According to the Russian Defense Ministry's third Central Research Institute, the Russian military should consider switching back to improved 7.62×39 mm ammunition due to 5.45×39 mm penetration insufficiency against body armor at longer ranges. However, the change is yet to happen due to the development of the 7N39 cartridge with great penetration capabilities.

== 5.45×39mm cartridge variants ==
=== Enhanced penetration cartridges ===
As body armor saw increasing use in militaries, the original 7N6 standard service cartridge bullet construction was changed several times to improve penetration. This resulted in the 7N6M, 7N10, 7N22, 7N24 and 7N39 variants.

The 7N6M (M—Russian: Модернизированный; Modernizirovanniy or "modernized") cartridge was introduced in 1987. In contrast to the original 7N6 unhardened steel rod penetrator the 7N6M rod penetrator is made of steel 65 and hardened to 60 HRC. The 7N6M 3.43 g (52.9 gr) boat-tail bullet can penetrate a 6 mm thick St3 steel plate at 300 m. 7N6(M) bullets have a red identification ring above the cartridge neck. The US Army's Ballistic Research Laboratory measured a ballistic coefficient (G7 BC) of 0.168 and form factor (G7 i) of 0.929 for the 7N6(M) projectile, which indicates good aerodynamic efficiency and external ballistic performance for the bullet diameter. The rounds are loaded to produce a maximal pressure of 290.00 MPa (42,061 psi).

The Bureau of Alcohol, Tobacco, Firearms and Explosives classified the 7N6 cartridge as "armor piercing handgun ammunition" on 7 April 2014, and, as such, it is illegal to import from Russia to the United States.

The 7N10 "improved penetration" cartridge was introduced in 1992. The 7N10 boat-tail bullet weighs 3.60 g (55.6 gr) and the weight of the lengthened sleeker steel (high-carbon steel U12A) penetrator made of steel 70 was increased to 1.80 g (27.8 gr) and the lead plug in front of it was discarded. The hollow cavity at the front of these projectiles was reduced significantly compared to previous 7N6(M) projectiles. In 1994 the 7N10 design was improved by filling the remaining hollow cavity in the projectiles front with lead and reducing the weight of the penetrator to 1.72 g (26.5 gr) resulting in a bullet weighing 3.62 g (55.9 gr). Upon impacting a hard target, soft lead is pressed sideways by the steel penetrator, tearing the jacket. It has a ballistic coefficient (G1 BC) of approximately 0.351 and (G7 BC) of approximately 0.176. The 7N10 cartridge replaced the previous variants as standard Russian service round and can penetrate a 16 mm thick St3 steel plate at 100 m and 6B3TM ballistic vest at 200 m. 7N10 bullets have a violet/purple identification ring above the cartridge neck. The 7N10 and 7N6(M) cartridges have practically identical external ballistic characteristics, meaning they can share identical sighting lines and optics on firearms. The rounds are loaded to produce a maximal pressure of 300.00 MPa (43,511 psi).

The 7N22 armour-piercing bullet, introduced in 1998, has a 1.75 g (27.0 gr) sharp-pointed steel penetrator made of steel U12A and retains the soft lead plug in the nose for jacket discarding. 7N22 boat-tail bullets weigh 3.69 g (56.9 gr) and can be identified by their red identification ring above the cartridge neck and a black tip. It has a ballistic coefficient (G7 BC) of approximately 0.180. The rounds are loaded to produce a maximal pressure of 290.00 MPa (42,061 psi).

The 7N24 "super-armor-piercing" cartridge, introduced in 1999, has a stub cone nosed penetrator made of tungsten carbide (hard alloy VK8). The 7N24 round is loaded with a 4.15 g (64.0 gr) projectile containing a 1.8 g (27.8 gr) penetrator which is fired with a muzzle velocity of 840 m/s (2,756 ft/s) yielding 1,464 J (1,080 ft⋅lbf) muzzle energy. The rounds are loaded to produce a maximal pressure of 300 MPa (44,000 psi). 7N24 bullets have a black identification ring above the cartridge neck.

The 7N39 armor-piercing cartridge, introduced in 2013, has a penetrator made of a tungsten carbide (92%) and cobalt (8%) alloy. The round is loaded with a 4.1 g (63.3 gr) bullet containing a 1.9 g (29.3 gr) penetrator which is fired at a muzzle velocity of 850 m/s (2,789 ft/s) yielding 1,481 J (1,092 ft⋅lbf) muzzle energy. The rounds are loaded to produce a maximal pressure of 300 MPa (44,000 psi). 7N39 cartridges have a black identification ring above the cartridge neck.

=== Tracer cartridges ===
Besides that the tracer cartridges 7T3 and 7T3M were developed. The 7T3 production bullet length was 26.54 mm (1.04 in) long and weighed 3.36 g (51.9 gr). After 1976 a new lighter 3.2 g (49.4 gr) and shorter 25.32 mm (1.00 in) long bullet was selected as a replacement for the original bullet. These bullets can be identified by their green marked tips. The tracer projectile has a shorter ogival profile and for 7T3 ammunition burns out to 800 m (870 yd) and for 7T3M ammunition ignites at 50 m (55 yd) burning out to 850 m (930 yd). The rounds are loaded to produce a maximal pressure of 290 MPa (42,000 psi).

An armor piercing tracer load was also developed (7BT4), adopted in 2005. The round was loaded with a 4.4 g (67.9 gr) bullet containing a hardened tool-grade steel core with lead wrapping which is fired at a muzzle velocity of 879-895 m/s. It can be identified by its green bullet tip. It was made to achieve 100% penetration of 5 mm thick steel plate "5P" up to 70 metres.

=== Training and instruction cartridges ===
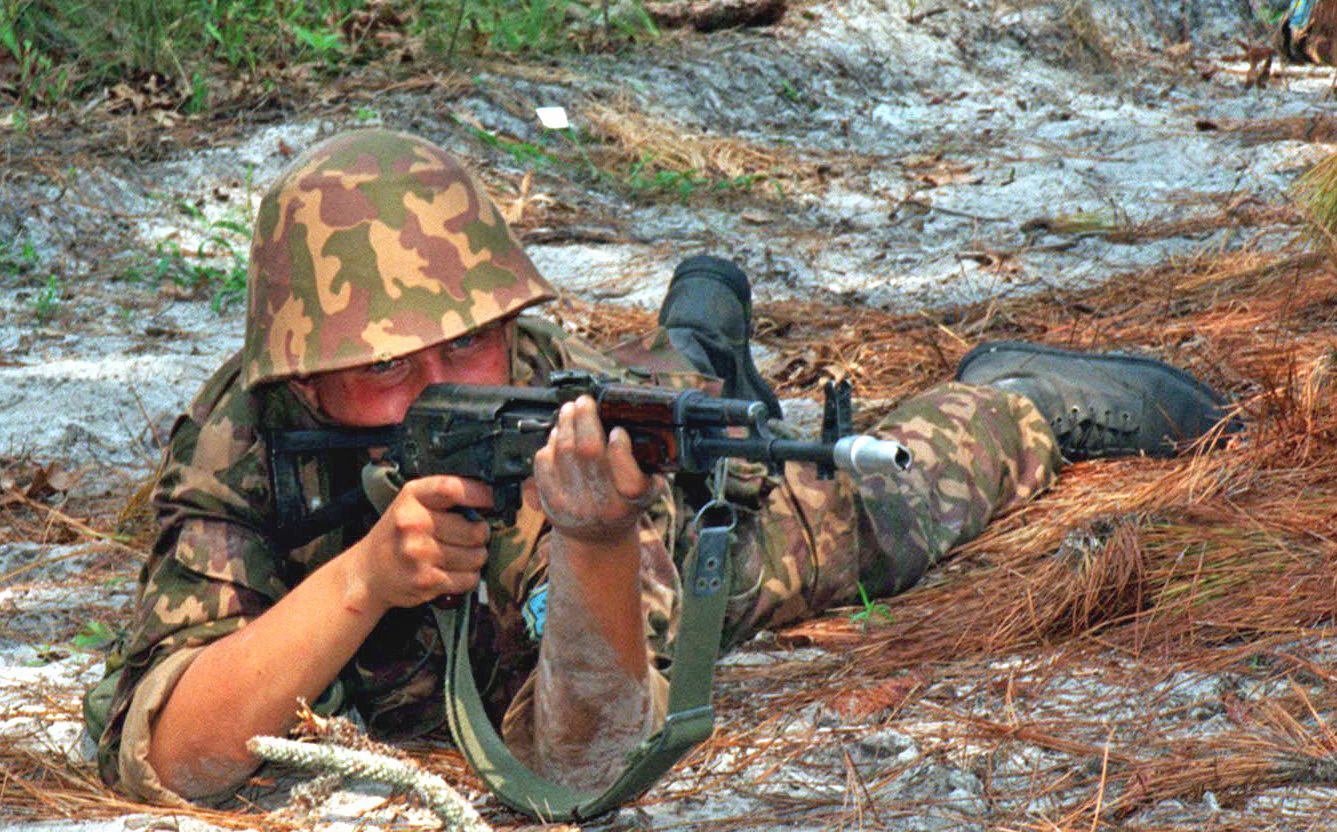
Kazakh soldier training with an AKS-74 rifle equipped with a blank fire adaptor

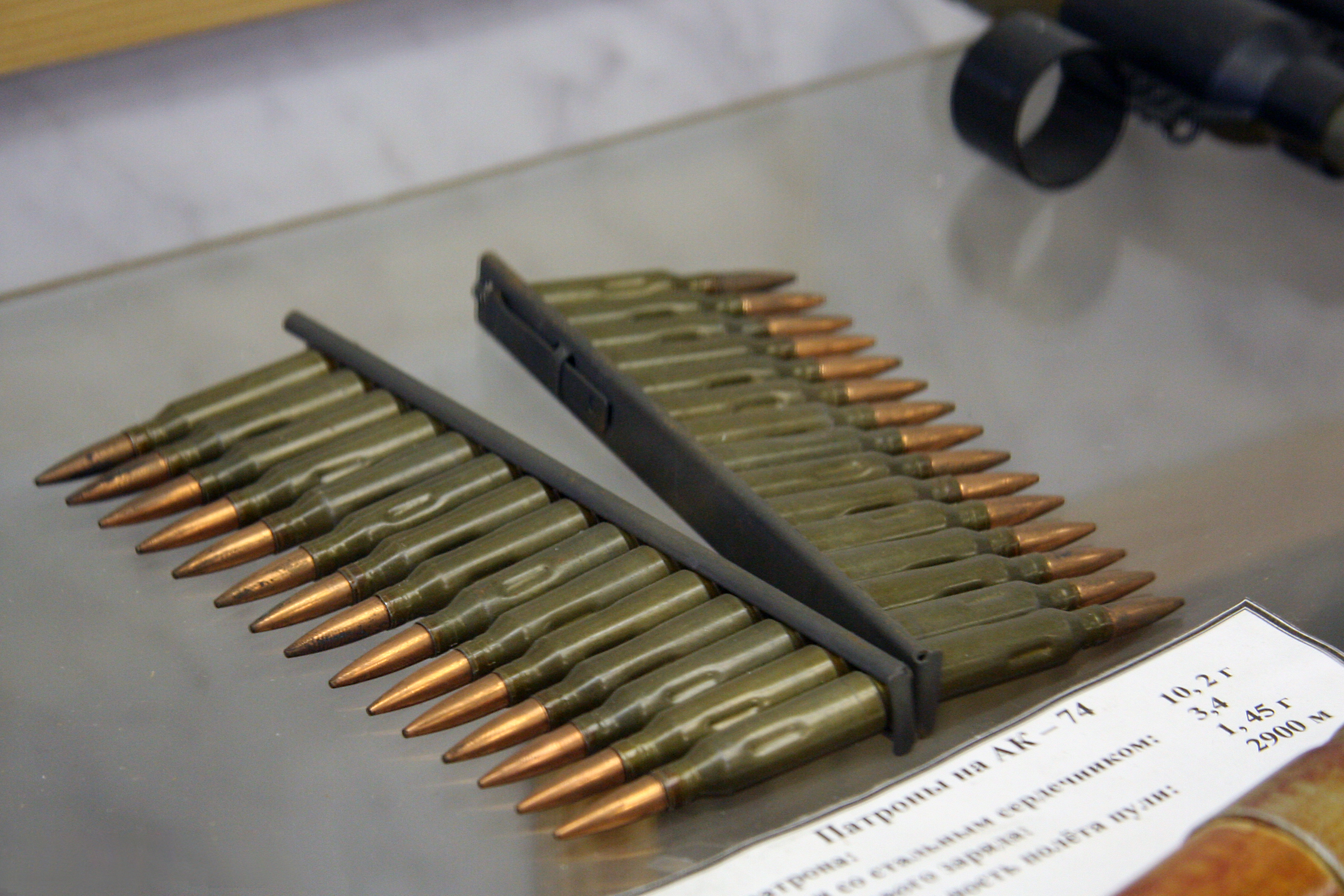
7H4 training or dummy cartridges

For training purposes the blank cartridges 7H3, 7H3M and 7Kh3 were developed. These rounds have a hollow white plastic imitation projectile. When these training rounds are used, the barrel of the gun is fitted at the muzzle with a blank fire adapter to produce a gas pressure build-up for cycling the gun, as well as a breakup aid for their plastic projectiles.

For instruction purposes the 7H4 training or dummy cartridge (which has longitudinal grooves) was developed.

=== Special purpose cartridges ===
For special purposes the 7U1 subsonic cartridge with a black and green painted meplat and CAP (cartridge for underwater) were developed.

The 7U1 subsonic cartridge weight is 11 g (170 gr) and is loaded with a 5.2 g (80 gr) projectile which is fired with a muzzle velocity of 303 m/s (994 ft/s) yielding 239 J (176 ft⋅lbf) muzzle energy. Accuracy of fire at 100 m (109 yd) (R_{50}) is 35 mm (1.4 in)

=== Basic specifications ===
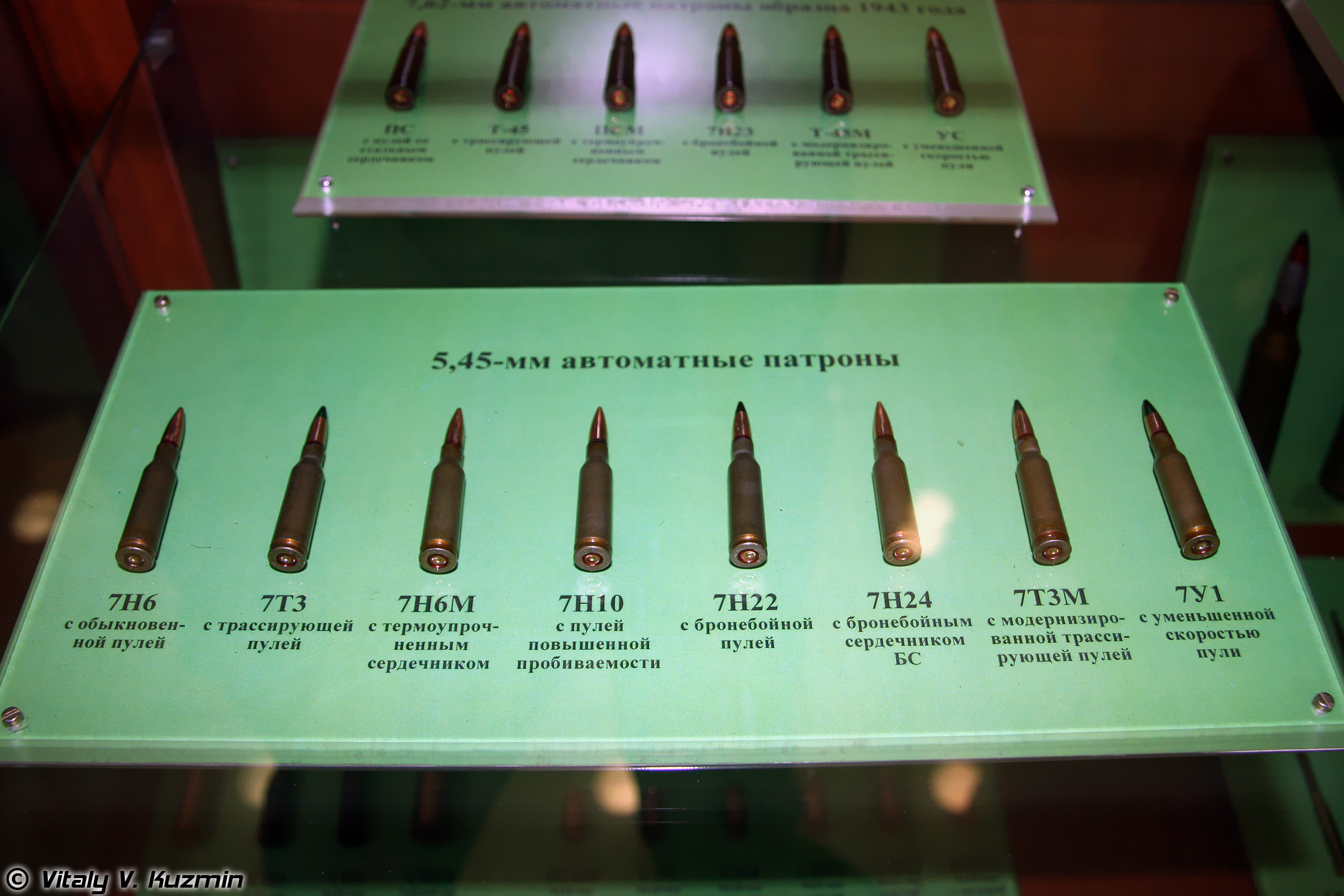
Various 5.45×39mm military cartridge variants

Cartridge designation	7N6M	7N10	7N22	7N24	7N39	7T3 (tracer)	7Kh3 (training)
Cartridge weight	10.5 g (162 gr)	10.7 g (165 gr)	10.75 g (166 gr)	11.20 g (173 gr)	11.72 g (181 gr)	10.3 g (159 gr)	6.65 g (103 gr)
Bullet weight	3.43 g (52.9 gr)	3.62 g (55.9 gr)	3.69 g (56.9 gr)	4.15 g (64.0 gr)	4.10 g (63.3 gr)	3.2 g (49.4 gr)	0.24 g (3.7 gr)
Muzzle velocity	880 m/s (2,887 ft/s)	880 m/s (2,887 ft/s)	890 m/s (2,920 ft/s)	840 m/s (2,756 ft/s)	850 m/s (2,789 ft/s)	883 m/s (2,897 ft/s)	
Muzzle energy	1,328 J (979 ft⋅lbf)	1,402 J (1,034 ft⋅lbf)	1,461 J (1,078 ft⋅lbf)	1,464 J (1,080 ft⋅lbf)	1,481 J (1,092 ft⋅lbf)	1,259 J (929 ft⋅lbf)	
Pressure	290 MPa (42,061 psi)	300 MPa (43,511 psi)	290 MPa (42,061 psi)	300 MPa (43,511 psi)	300 MPa (43,511 psi)	290 MPa (42,061 psi)	
Accuracy of fire at 300 m (328 yd) (R_{50})	75 mm (3.0 in)	90 mm (3.5 in)	90 mm (3.5 in)	96 mm (3.8 in)		140 mm (5.5 in)	

- R_{50} at 300 m (328 yd) means the closest 50 percent of the shot group will all be within a circle of the mentioned diameter at 300 m (328 yd).
- The twist rate used in the AK-74M assault rifle that has been adopted as the new service rifle of the Russian Federation in 1991 is 200 mm (7.87 in).

== Civil use ==
The 5.45×39 mm was developed by the Soviet Union for military use and it was not intended to create civilian weapons in this chambering. When 5.45×39 mm ammunition finally became available for sale to civilians, several arms manufacturers started to offer semi-automatic AK-74 variants in the calibre for civilian use. Sometimes these weapons combine parts originating from Russia or Eastern European states and parts produced elsewhere. Only a few civilian 5.45×39 mm weapons were developed and commercially offered. Non-AK-74 rifles and commercial offerings include the East German SSG 82 bolt action rifle and the Russian CRS-98 "Vepr-5, 45" semi-automatic carbine and Saiga semi-automatic rifle. In May 2008 the Smith & Wesson M&P15R was introduced. This was a standard AR-15 rifle chambered for the 5.45×39 mm cartridge and was Smith & Wesson's first AR-variant rifle in a chambering other than 5.56×45 mm NATO and is no longer in current (2012) production. The civilian version of the Tavor TAR-21 rifle produced for the US market includes an optional 5.45×39mm conversion kit.

=== Commercial 5.45×39 mm ammunition ===
The US ammunition manufacturer Hornady produces commercial polymer-coated steel case 5.45×39 mm ammunition loaded with 3.89 g (60.0 gr) polymer tipped V-MAX bullets with a stated ballistic coefficient (G1 BC) of 0.285. It is unknown if Hornady plans to continue manufacturing this caliber, as the last confirmed lot number was released in 2021. WOLF Performance Ammunition offers several Berdan primed commercial 5.45×39mm loads. The Russian ammunition manufacturer Barnaul Cartridge Plant also offers several Berdan primed commercial sporting and hunting 5.45×39 mm cartridges. Barnaul states that their 5.45×39mm cartridges produce a maximal pressure of 294,2 MPa (41,054 psi) and have a bullet dispersion R_{100} of 25 mm (1.0 in) at a range of 100 m (109 yd), meaning every shot of a shot group will be within a circle of the mentioned diameter at 100 m (109 yd). The American firearms corporation Century International Arms offers Ukrainian made 5.45×39mm cartridges with steel casings and bi-metal (copper/steel) jacketed bullets under the Red Army Standard Ammunition brand. The Russian manufacturer Tula Arms Plant states that its Tula Ammunition cartridges comply with the 5.45×39 mm C.I.P. rulings producing a maximal pressure of 302.7 MPa (43,900 psi) and keeps their qualities under various climatic and weather conditions independent of the season and at a temperature range from −50 to 50 °C (−58 to 122 °F). Tula's 3.89 g (60.0 gr) full metal jacket bullet has a stated ballistic coefficient (G1 BC) of 0.329 and its 3.89 g (60.0 gr) hollow-point bullet has a stated ballistic coefficient (G1 BC) of 0.301.

As of August 20, 2021, ammunition manufactured in Russia was added to the sanctions found in the CBW Act of 1991, (in retaliation to the Russian invasion of Ukraine) barring the importation of the majority of the cartridges listed above, to the United States.

Cartridge designation	Hornady V-MAX	WOLF Performance FMJ HP	WOLF Military Classic FMJ	WOLF Military Classic HP SP	Barnaul FMJBT	Barnaul SPBT	Barnaul HPBT	TULAMMO FMJ	TULAMMO HP
Bullet weight	3.89 g (60.0 gr)	3.89 g (60.0 gr)	3.89 g (60.0 gr)	3.565 g (55.0 gr)	3.85 g (59.4 gr)	3.56 g (54.9 gr)	3.56 g (54.9 gr)	3.89 g (60.0 gr)	3.89 g (60.0 gr)
Muzzle velocity	856.5 m/s (2,810 ft/s)	895 m/s (2,936 ft/s)	860 m/s (2,822 ft/s)	881 m/s (2,890 ft/s)	860 m/s (2,822 ft/s)	878 m/s (2,881 ft/s)	883 m/s (2,897 ft/s)	895 m/s (2,936 ft/s)	895 m/s (2,936 ft/s)
Muzzle energy	1,427 J (1,053 ft⋅lbf)	1,558 J (1,149 ft⋅lbf)	1,439 J (1,061 ft⋅lbf)	1,384 J (1,021 ft⋅lbf)	1,424 J (1,050 ft⋅lbf)	1,372 J (1,012 ft⋅lbf)	1,388 J (1,024 ft⋅lbf)	1,558 J (1,149 ft⋅lbf)	1,558 J (1,149 ft⋅lbf)

== Gallery ==
5.45×39mm 7N6(M) Cartridge Sectional Drawing
A: projectile jacket
B: steel core
C: hollow cavity
D: lead inlay
E: propelling charge

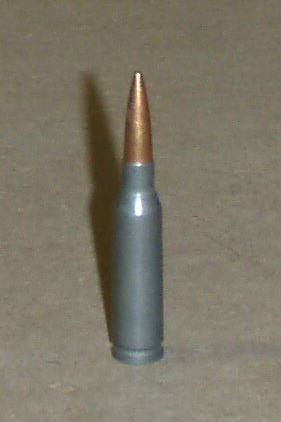
5.45×39mm cartridge with steel cartridge case.

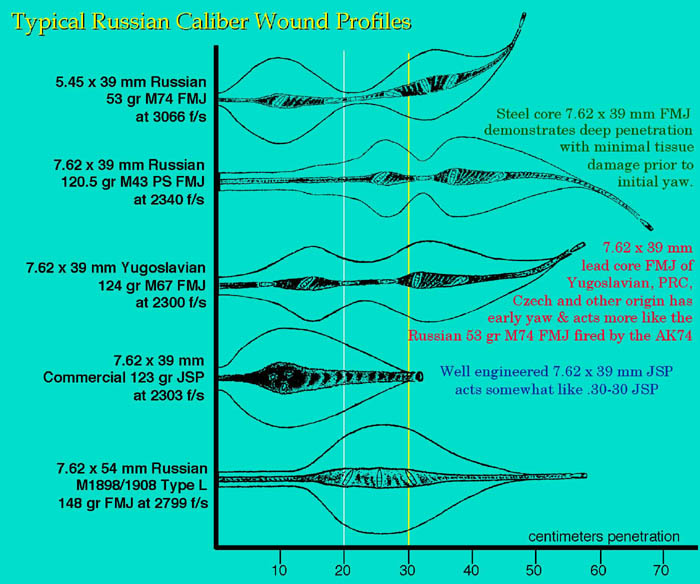
Wound profiles of Russian small-arms ammunition compiled by Martin Fackler on behalf of the U.S. military

== See also ==
- 5.56×45mm NATO
- 5.8×42mm
- 7.62×39mm
- 9×39mm
- 5.45×18mm
- Table of handgun and rifle cartridges
