= Korwa =

Korwa may refer to:

- Korwa people, an ethnic group in Jharkhand and Chhattisgarh, India
  - Korwa language, their Munda (Austroasiatic) language
- Korwa, Uttar Pradesh, a town in Uttar Pradesh, India
  - Korwa Ordnance Factory or Indo-Russia Rifles, a rifle factory in Korwa

== See also ==
- Kurwa (disambiguation)
- Kaurava, fictional faction in the ancient Indian epic Mahabharata
