= AK-12 =

Russian assault rifle and variants

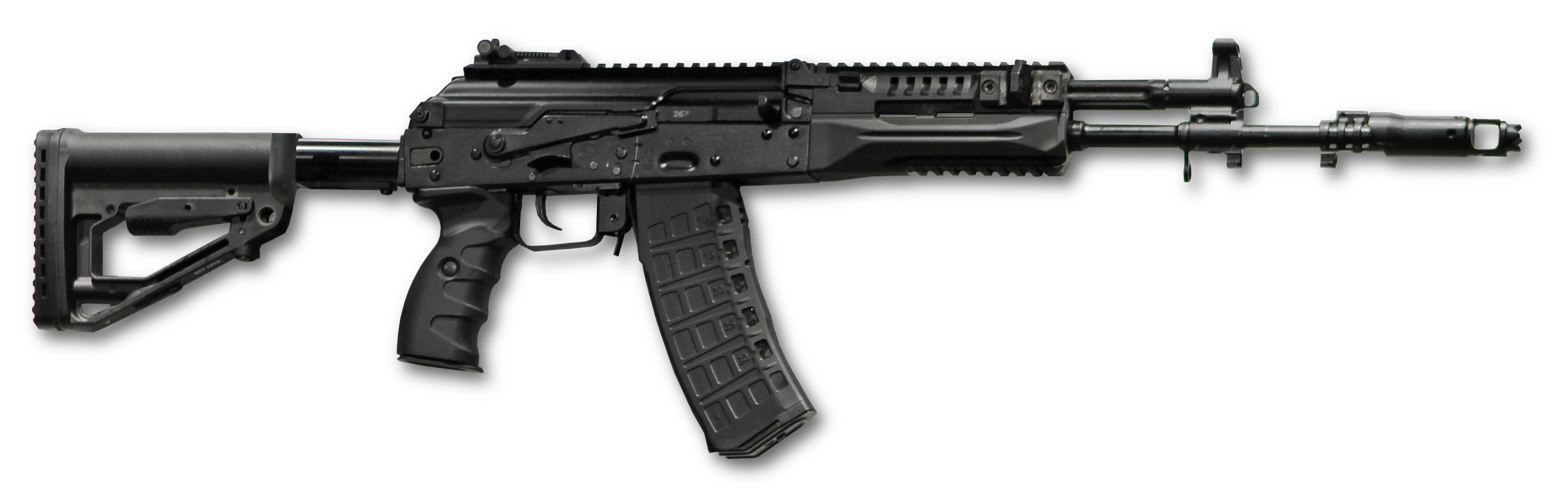
- Kalashnikov Concern AK-12 5.45×39mm assault rifle
- Type: Assault rifle; Carbine; Battle rifle
- Place of origin: Russia

Service history
- In service: 2018–present
- Used by: See Users
- Wars: Syrian civil war; Russo-Ukrainian War; Russo-Ukrainian war (2022–present)

Production history
- Designer: Mikhail Kalashnikov, Vladimir Zlobin, Sergey Urzhumcev
- Designed: 2011
- Manufacturer: Izhmash (now Kalashnikov Concern)
- Produced: 2018–present
- No. built: 150,000+
- Variants: See Variants

Specifications
- Mass: 3.7 kg (8.2 lb) empty (AK-12); 3.75 kg (8.27 lb) empty (AK-15); 3.8 kg (8.38 lb) empty (AK-19); 4.3 kg (9.48 lb) empty (AK-308)
- Length: 922 mm (36.3 in) full length; 688 mm (27.1 in) stock folded
- Barrel length: 415 mm (16.3 in); 290 mm (11.4 in) (AK-12K, AK-15K); 228 mm (9 in) (AK-12SK, AK-15SK)
- Cartridge: 5.45×39mm (AK-12); 7.62×39mm (AK-15); 5.56×45mm NATO (AK-19); 7.62×51mm NATO (AK-308)
- Action: Gas-operated long-stroke piston system, closed rotating bolt
- Rate of fire: 700 rounds/min
- Muzzle velocity: 880–900 m/s (2,887–2,953 ft/s) (AK-12); 715 m/s (2,346 ft/s) (AK-15); 910 m/s (3,000 ft/s) (AK-19)
- Effective firing range: 440 m (481 yd) point blank (AK-12); 350 m (383 yd) point blank (AK-15); 500 m (550 yd) (AK-19)
- Maximum firing range: 3,150 m (3,440 yd)
- Feed system: AK-12, AK-12K: 30-round detachable box magazine; 45-round detachable box magazine from the RPK-74; 60-round detachable casket magazine; 95-round detachable drum magazine from the RPK-16; AK-15, AK-15C: 30-round detachable box magazine; 40-round detachable box magazine from the RPK; 75-round detachable drum magazine from the RPK
- Sights: Back-up iron sights and integrated Picatinny rail for various optical sights

The AK-12 (Russian: Avtomat Kalashnikova, 2012 – GRAU index 6P70) is a Russian gas-operated assault rifle chambered in 5.45×39mm cartridge, designed and manufactured by Kalashnikov Concern (formerly Izhmash), making it the fifth generation of Kalashnikov rifles.

At the request of the Russian military during the Ratnik trials, a variant chambered in 7.62×39mm was developed alongside the AK-12, designated as the AK-15 (GRAU index 6P71). Compact variants of the AK-12 and AK-15 that feature shorter barrel lengths were also developed, respectively the AK-12K, AK-12SK, AK-15K and AK-15SK. To meet the interest of international clients, Kalashnikov Concern later developed a variant chambered in 5.56×45mm NATO, designated as the AK-19. A battle rifle variant chambered in 7.62×51mm NATO was later unveiled to further pique their interest, designated as the AK-308. A light machine gun based on the AK-12 was also designed in response to the "Tokar-2" program, designated as the RPK-16.

== History ==
The AK-12 project began in 2011 by the IZHMASH factory, which became part of the Kalashnikov Concern as a private venture, in an attempt to participate in the "Ratnik" trials which were held by the Russian army. The original design of the AK-12 went through three different prototype modifications to improve upon the range of defects discovered in the original design, to meet the Russian military's standard and to address the Russian army's concerns regarding the cost and issues in fully automatic fire. When Kalashnikov Concern took over development, the original prototype designs were later abandoned in favour of the well-proven design of the AK-400 prototype, which took over the "AK-12" designation and became the basis for the finalised model of the AK-12.

=== Developmental trials ===
On 25 May 2010, the Russian media published a Russian Ministry of Defence statement that the AK-12 was to be tested in 2011. The first prototype was presented to the Russian Prime Minister Vladimir Putin during his official visit to inspect the products of the Izhmash arms manufacturing plant in Izhevsk in February 2012. The prototype was fitted with a large-capacity 60-round casket magazine. On the early prototype model, the traditional locations of the cocking handle, safety lever, and fire selector remained unchanged, but the AK-12's production model featured revisions to all of these features.

In June 2012, the AK-12 was unveiled to the public for the first time at the defence exhibition in Moscow, Engineer Technologies 2012. On 16 September 2013, the Deputy Chairman of the Military-Industrial Commission of Russia said the Russian Army would start receiving AK-12 assault rifles chambered in 5.45 mm and 7.62 mm in 2014. The new rifle would be put into service along with the new handguns, machine guns and sniper rifles. The AK-12 basic platform allows for nearly 20 different modifications to change into other configurations.

State trials were to begin in fall 2013. However, on 23 September 2013, the Izvestiya tabloid wrote that, according to an anonymous source, the AK-12 will not be adopted or even undergo state tests due to shortcomings in preliminary tests. The AK-12 was intended to replace three previous generations of AK models and to be standardised as the primary assault rifle of the Russian military. The government rejected the AK-12 because senior commanders said they had millions of stockpiled AK-74s and did not need a new rifle. However, trials would continue for law enforcement agencies.

However, on 23 December 2014, the Russian Army announced that the AK-12, as well as the 6P67 KORD, had passed state trials and would be accepted into service with operational units for evaluation. It was expected that both rifles would begin being trialled operationally by Russian forces by March 2015.

On 6 September 2016, it was reported that Kalashnikov Concern introduced the final production model of the AK-12, which was derived from the AK-400 prototype model and has replaced the earlier prototype models. There were two base models that were introduced, the AK-12 which is chambered in 5.45×39mm cartridge and the AK-15 which is chambered in 7.62×39mm cartridge. Kalashnikov Concern also introduced a new light machine gun that is chambered in 5.45×39mm cartridge, the RPK-16 which is based on the traditional Kalashnikov layout and design and has several novel technical and ergonomic features derived from the AK-12 program.

It was also reported that the final production model of the AK-12 and AK-15 began participating in troop trials with the Russian Army, where it competed against the Degtyarov 6P67 KORD and 6P68 KORD balanced action assault rifles. The AK-12 completed its operational testing and passed military field tests in June 2017. Both AK-12 and AK-15 completed testing in December 2017.

=== Military adoption and service ===
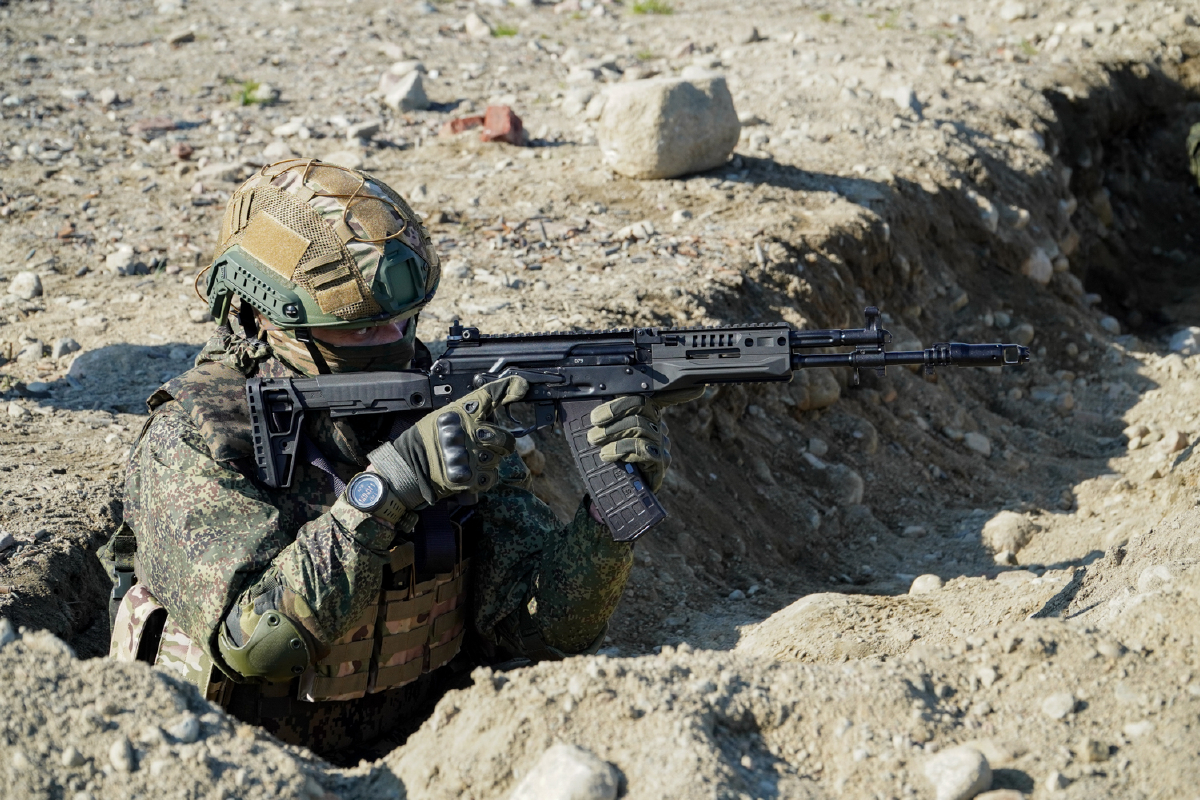
Russian Naval infantryman of the Northern Fleet with an AK-12

Testing of the AK-12 concluded in December 2017, and in January 2018 it was announced that the AK-12 and AK-15 have been adopted by the Russian military forces.

The AK-12's first confirmed use in a conflict was during the Russian invasion of Ukraine by some units of the Russian armed forces. Ukrainian forces have captured a few AK-12s, in addition to limited usage by members of its Territorial Defense Forces. Videos posted on YouTube by the Ukrainian 3rd Assault Brigade, showed several of their soldiers using AK-12s.

== Design details ==
=== 2012–2015 prototype models ===
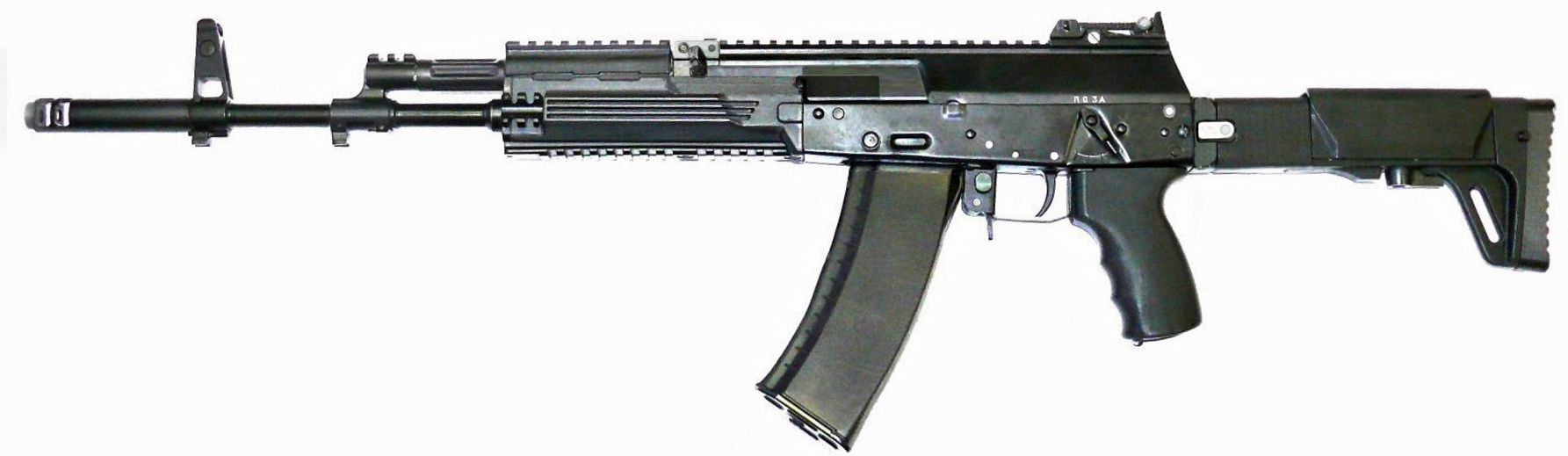
2012 prototype of the AK-12

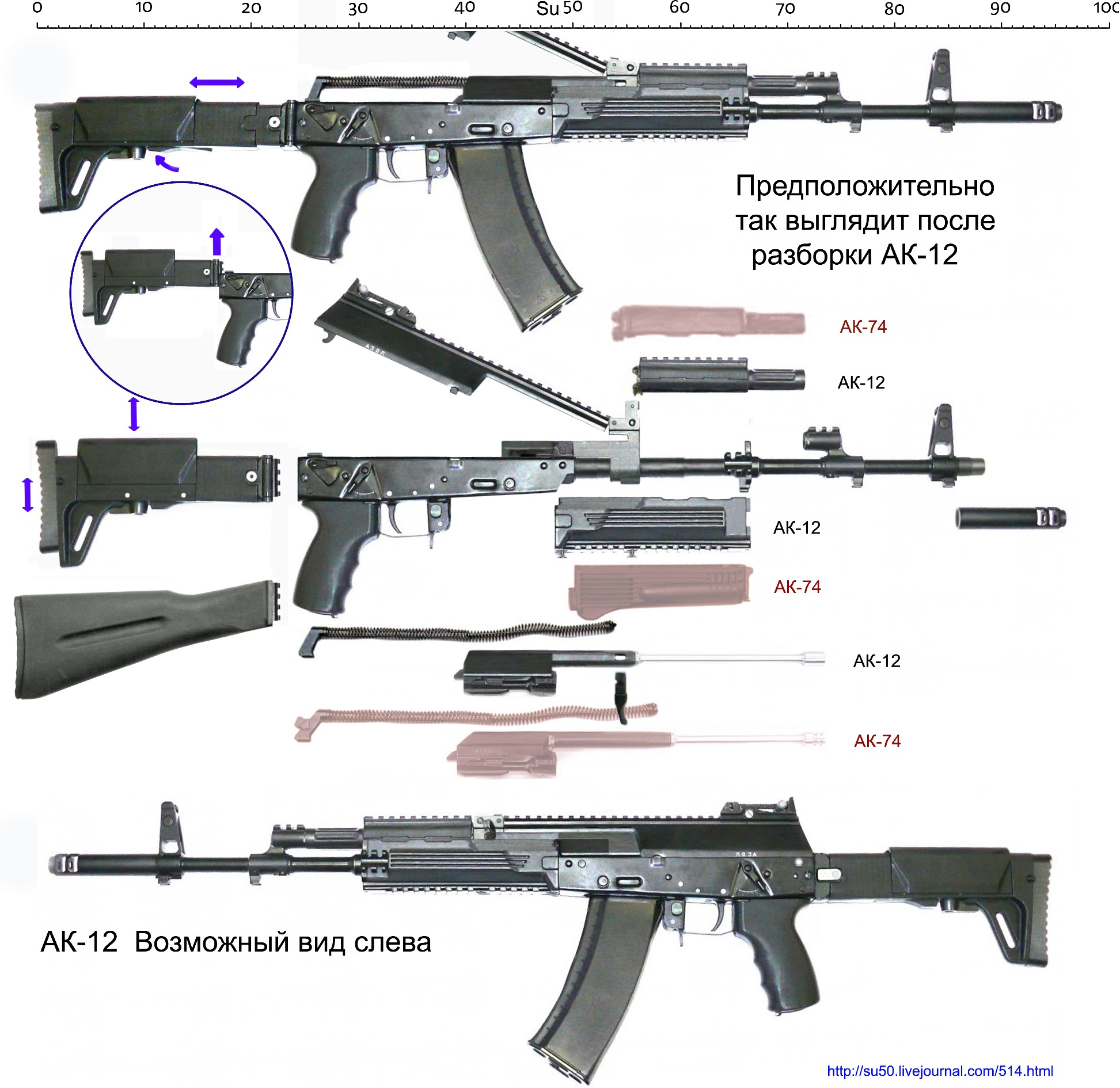
Field-stripped view of the AK-12 2012 prototype, in a side-by-side comparison with AK-74 parts

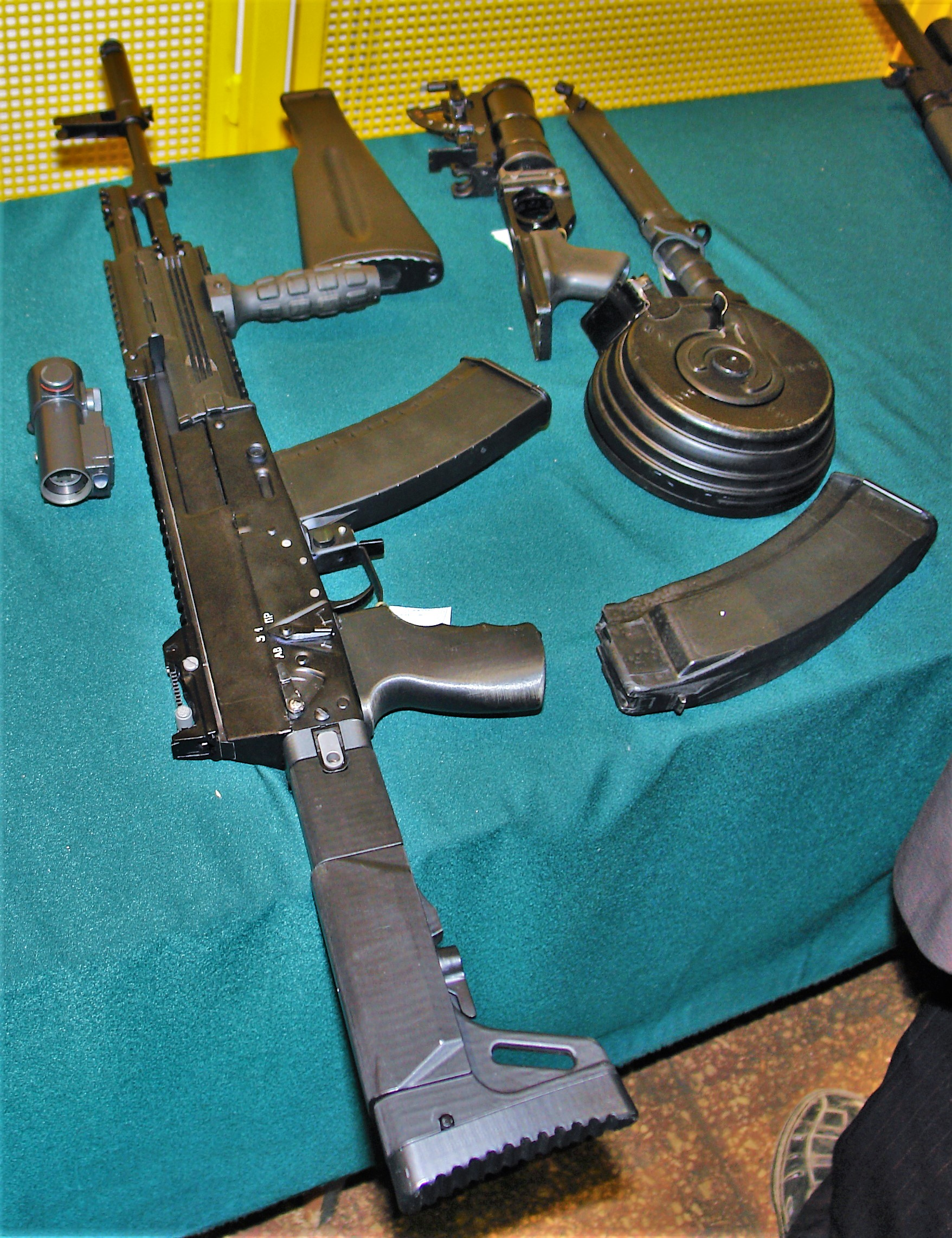
2012 prototype of the AK-12 with various accessories

The prototype model from 2012 uses the same gas-operated long-stroke piston system of the previous Kalashnikov rifles, but many features are radically different from the other rifles in its family. The light version has the ability to change calibres by swapping the barrels. It is chambered in 5.45×39mm cartridge as for the standard configuration and can be either changed to the 7.62×39mm or 5.56×45mm NATO cartridge. Other intermediate calibres are also expected. The heavy version will chamber the larger 7.62×51mm NATO cartridge. It is fed through the standard AK-74M 30-round magazines and can also accept the 45-round magazines from the RPK-74. The 7.62×39mm Soviet-chambered version is compatible with the AKM's 30-round magazine and RPK's 40-round box magazine and 75-round drum magazines. The magazines specifically for the cancelled prototype model of the AK-12 includes a 30-round magazine with a bolt-catch actuator, a 60-round quad-stack magazine and a 95-round drum.

The 2012 prototype model of the AK-12 is very different from its predecessors ergonomically. It features a telescoping buttstock that is in-line with the barrel for better recoil control and a stock latch, allowing for it to be folded to either side of the rifle. It has a rubber height-adjustable cheek piece and butt plate. The cocking handle is moved forward and can be attached to both sides for ambidextrous use. The receiver is hinged and more rigid with a Picatinny rail for mounting optics. There are several other accessory rails on the AK-12, including on both sides, bottom and on the top of the handguard (in-line with the receiver for a longer monolithic rail), and on top of the gas block. There is also a lug under the gas chamber that can mount a GP-34 grenade launcher and another one under the front sight holder mounts a bayonet. The rear iron sight is further back on the receiver and can be set for aiming when the stock is extended or folded. The magazine release is in the same position but can be used by the trigger finger to detach magazines. In a departure from previous AK-type rifles, the dust cover safety selector has been replaced with an ambidextrous fire selector; it has four positions safe, semi-automatic, three-round burst fire and fully automatic fire. Other improvements include a smaller ejection port, more ergonomic pistol grip, improved rifling and a muzzle brake with a 22 mm threading that can fire NATO-standard rifle grenades.

The 2012 prototype design of the AK-12 was significantly redesigned after the first round of testing. In 2013, the second prototype design was developed, and it had a different stock, receiver cover, bolt stop and magazine release. In spring of 2015, the third prototype design was introduced. The handguard, muzzle device and fire selector have been redesigned, and the gas block and front sight were combined into a single unit.

=== Final production model ===
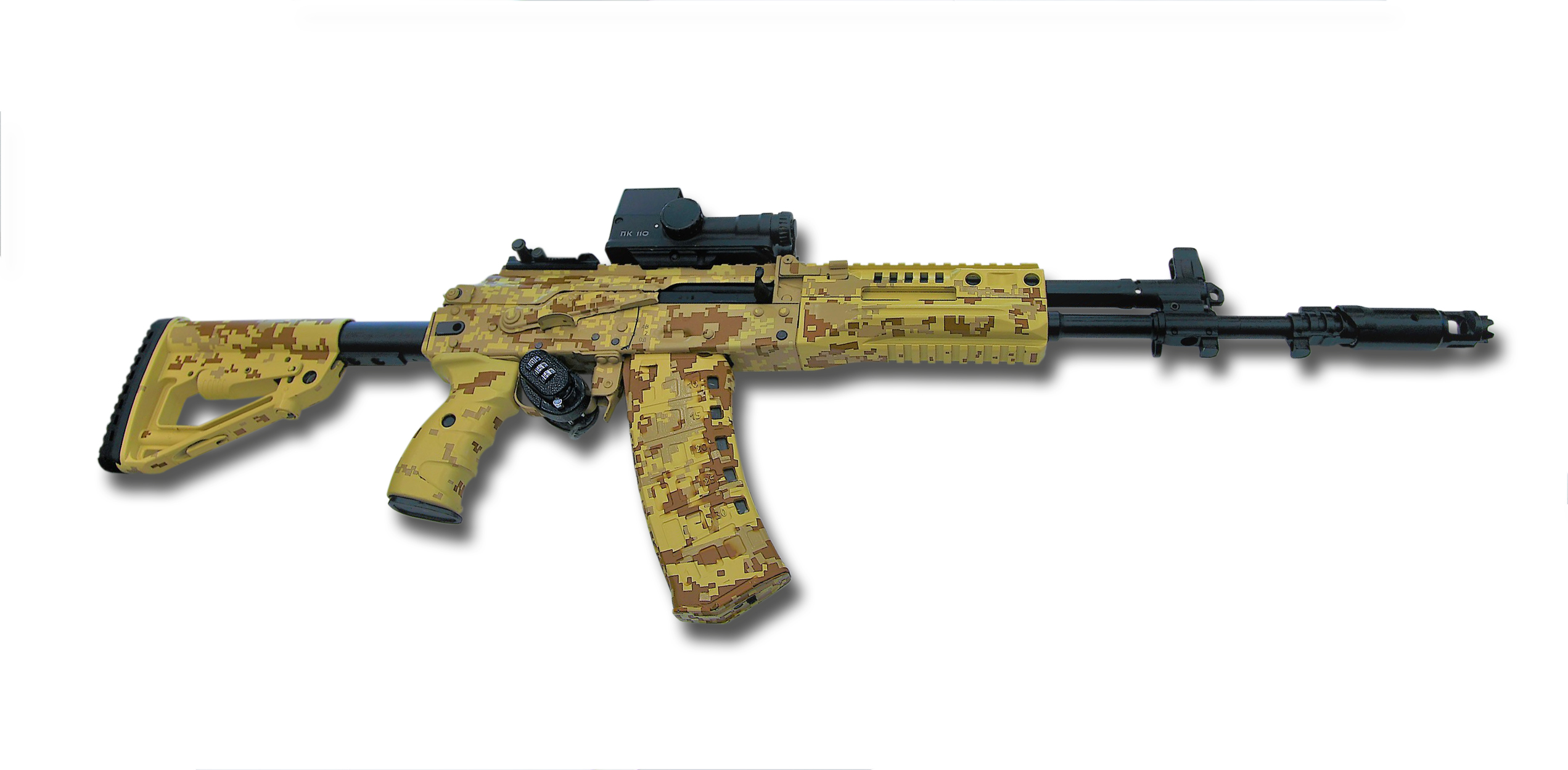
Final production model of the AK-12, based on the AK-400 prototype

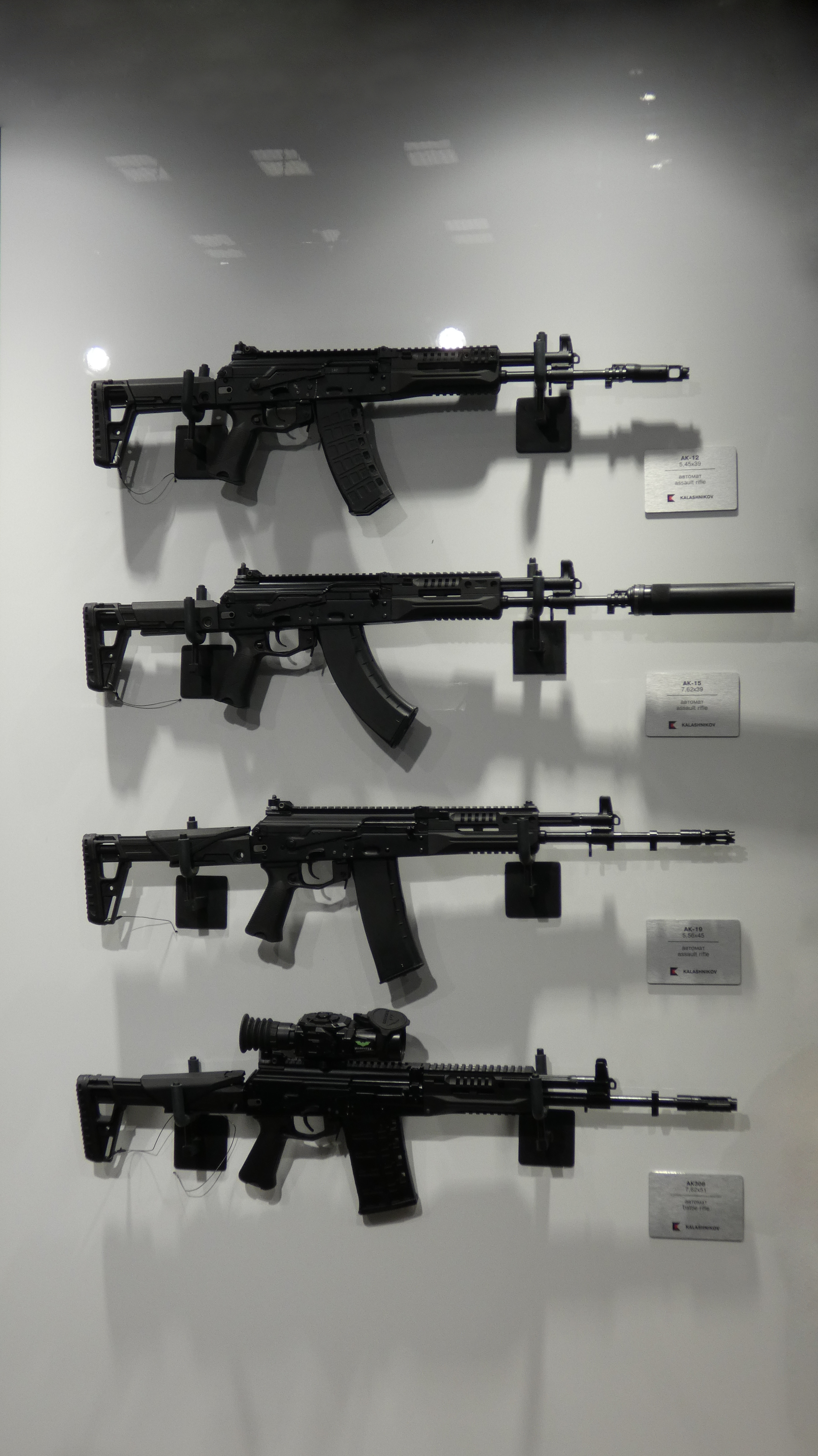
AK-12, AK-15, AK-19, and AK-308 (top to bottom) at the ARMY-2021 exhibition

The final production model of the AK-12 is based on the well-proven design from the AK-400 prototype, which is said to be more reliable, more accurate and better suited to the latest Russian military requirements. A major technical alteration in the AK-400 prototype versus legacy AKs was the free-floating of the barrel from the handguards. On all previous AK rifles, the lower handguard of the rifle was mounted directly on the barrel with a stamped steel handguard retainer. As a result, a force exerted on the handguard affects the zero of the rifle. In the AK-400 prototype, the handguard is attached to the receiver and to a revised more rigid and non-removable gas tube, allowing the barrel to remain relatively isolated and flex and vibrate unrestricted for increased accuracy.

With the final production model, it addresses the Russian Army's concerns regarding the issues in fully automatic fire and the cost of the earlier prototype models and is also expected to be much cheaper to build. It also incorporates many of the same improvements developed for the earlier prototype models of the AK-12 but also improves the strength and resilience of some of the components of the rifle.

The design of the final production model of the AK-12 shares more in common with the existing AK-74M than its earlier prototype models, but will not be a retrofit to existing assault rifles. Several improvements were made to the AK-12's receiver, such as an improved and far more rigid top cover interface and a new free-floating barrel. The final production model of the AK-12 reportedly outperforms the existing AK-74 by at least the margin requested by the Russian government.

The final production model of the AK-12 has a cyclic rate of fire of 700 rounds per minute. The three-round burst feature from the earlier prototype models was replaced by a two-round burst feature in the final production model.

Reports from soldiers during the Russian invasion of Ukraine, stated that the AK-12 did not hold zero when the dust cover was removed and reinstalled. Additionally, the selector switch could be easily be set too far down far beyond the original intent, partially obstructing the pistol grip and trigger. Several AK-12s were captured by Ukrainian forces with the selector being set so far down that they were almost perpendicular to the lower receiver.

==== Muzzle device ====
The distinctive quick detachable muzzle brake features a large expansion chamber, two symmetrical vertical cuts at the forward end of the brake and three non-symmetrical positioned vent holes to counteract muzzle rise and climb as well as lateral shift to the right and features a crown-shaped glass breaker at the end. A flat plate near the end of the brake produces a forward thrust when emerging exhaust gases strike its surface, greatly reducing recoil.

==== Pistol grip and fire selector ====
The AK-12 features an ergonomic pistol grip with an internal maintenance kit storage room, a retractable side-folding telescoping 4 position shoulder stock which is adjustable for length of pull and height adjustable buttpad and has storage room for a 3-piece cleaning rod and a free floating handguard with ventilation holes. The stock visually resembles the Magpul CTR stock and the 'buffer tube' that the stock is attached to is propriety. The dust cover firing modes (semi-automatic, 2-round burst and fully automatic) and safety selector lever is similar to previous AK-type rifles, but has extensions added for making it possible to manipulate the lever with the right-hand index finger or left-hand thumb. This style of selector lever was and is sold as an aftermarket part outside Russia and is known in the United States as the Krebs-style safety.

==== Sights ====
The AK-12 uses a range and windage adjustable aperture-type rear tangent iron sight calibrated in 100 m (109 yd) increments from 100 to 800 m (109 to 875 yd). The front sight is a shrouded post adjustable for elevation in the field. The Warsaw Pact side dovetail rail for mounting optical sights on legacy AKs and other small arms was replaced by a Picatinny rail for mounting sights.

==== Magazines ====
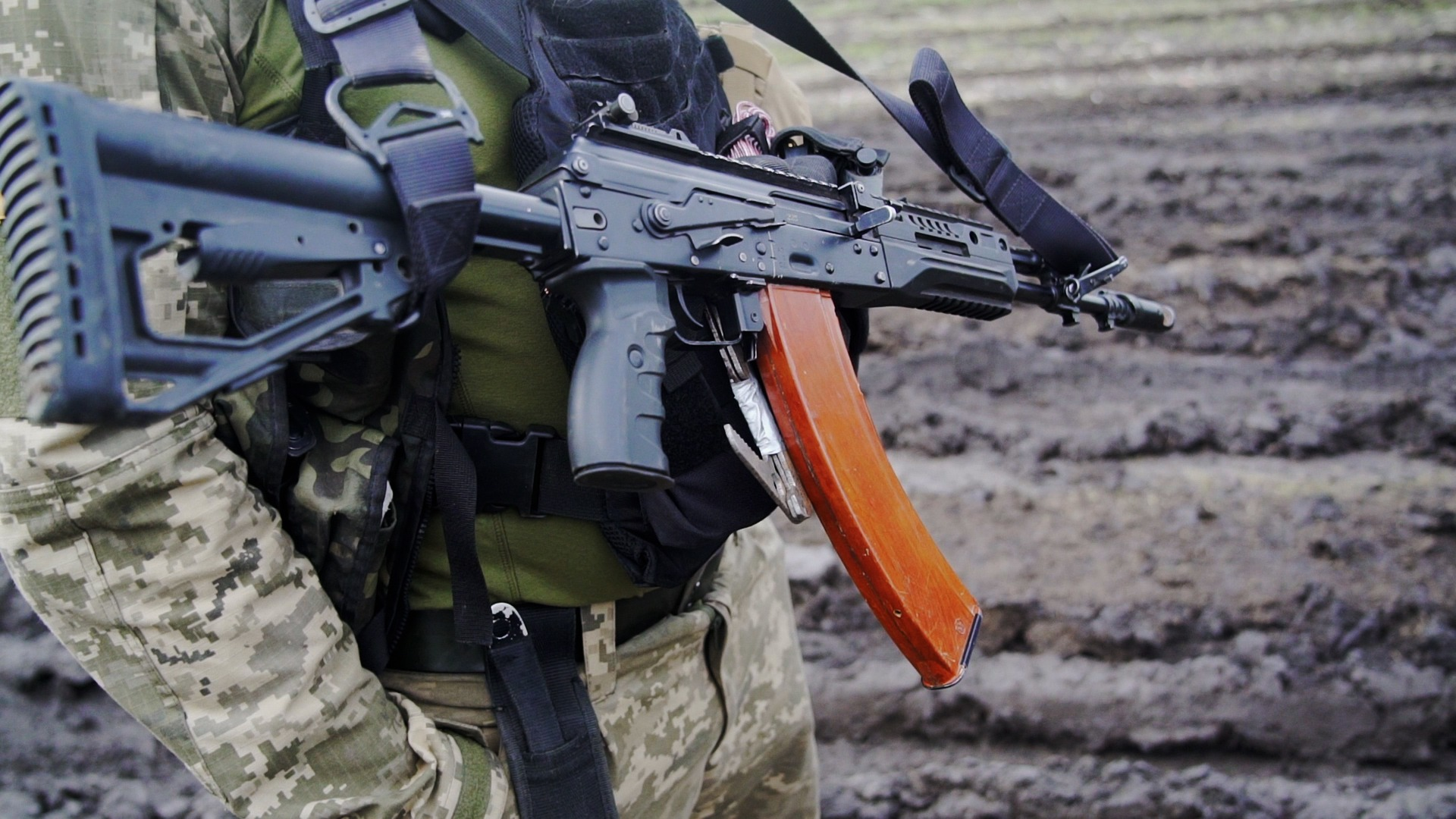
AK-12 with a 5.45×39mm 1970s orange pattern 45-round magazine made of Bakelite AG-4S polymer

The new 5.45×39mm box magazines are backwards compatible with other 5.45×39mm Kalashnikov rifles and feature a slant angle on the bottom rear portion to provide a more rigid and stable contact with the ground when the gun is rested on the magazine. It also features witness windows at the 10-, 15-, 20-, 25- and 30-rounds positions to indicate the current loaded number of rounds, similar to Magpul PMAGs. The witness windows numbering indicate the position of the follower inside the magazine. The follower has glow in the dark paint applied to both sides that can be viewed through the witness windows during low light conditions. When the new box magazine is fully loaded, a pin protrudes on the baseplate providing a possibility of a visual and tactile identification of a fully loaded magazine in the pouch. The AK-12 is also compatible with preceding 5.45×39mm box magazines from the AK-74, RPK-74, and the 95-round drum magazine from the RPK-16.

==== Accessories ====
The AK-12 can also be fitted with a quick detachable sound suppressor and a bayonet. To further increase the combat effectiveness of the rifle, it can be equipped with a 40 mm GP-25/GP-34 single-shot underbarrel grenade launcher.

== Variants ==
=== AK-12 (2018 model) ===
The AK-12 (GRAU index 6P70) is chambered in 5.45×39mm and served as a template for several variants. It features a Picatinny rail on top of the receiver for mounting optical sights, as well as additional rails on the handguard's top, bottom, and sides for attaching various accessories. It has a barrel length of 415 mm (16.3 in), an empty weight of 3.5 kg (7.72 lb) a maximum firing range of 800 m (870 yd), and a standard magazine capacity of 30 rounds.

=== AK-12 (2020 and 2021 models) ===
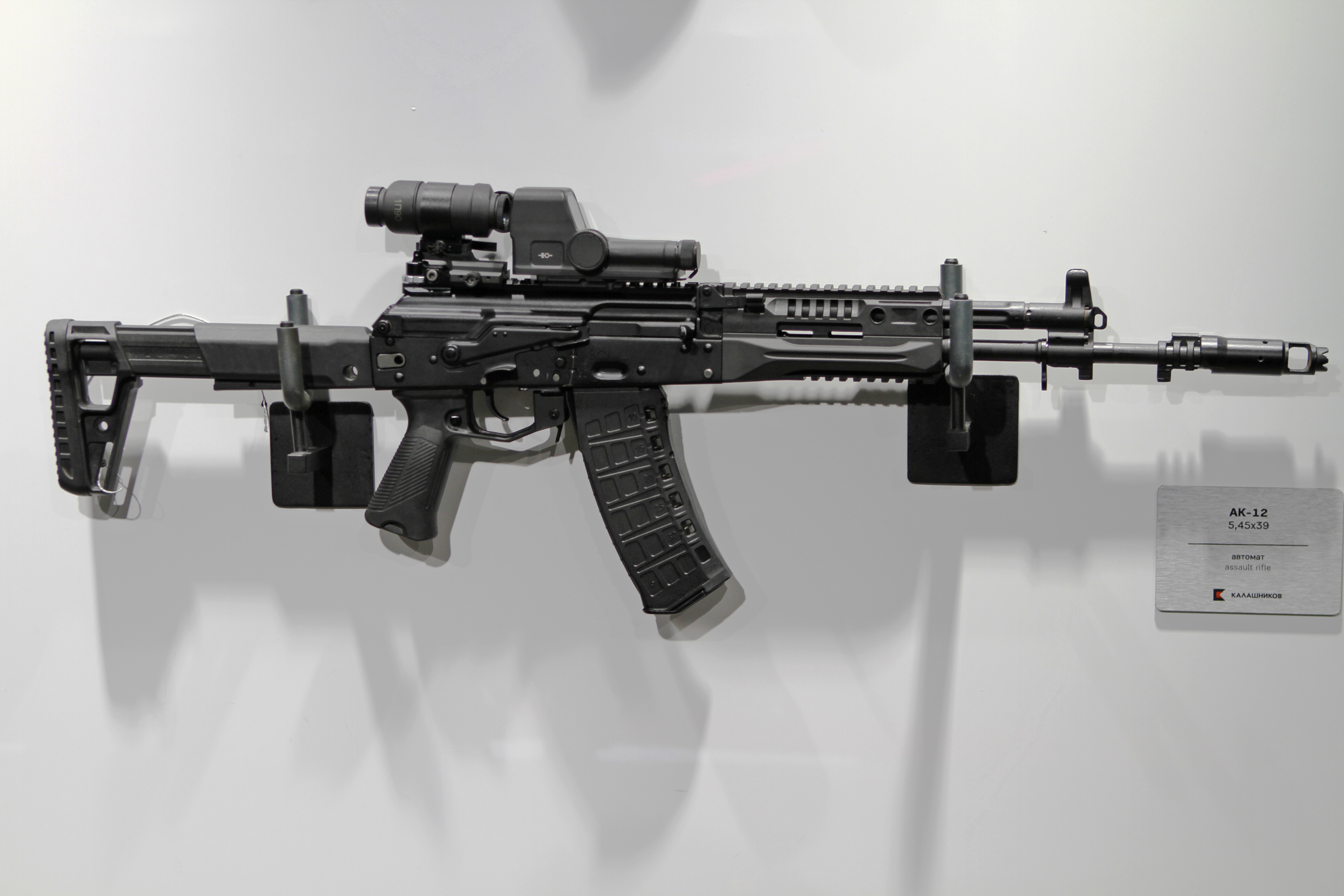
AK-12 (2020 model) with the redesigned stock, pistol grip, trigger guard and new rear sight at the ARMY-2020 exhibition

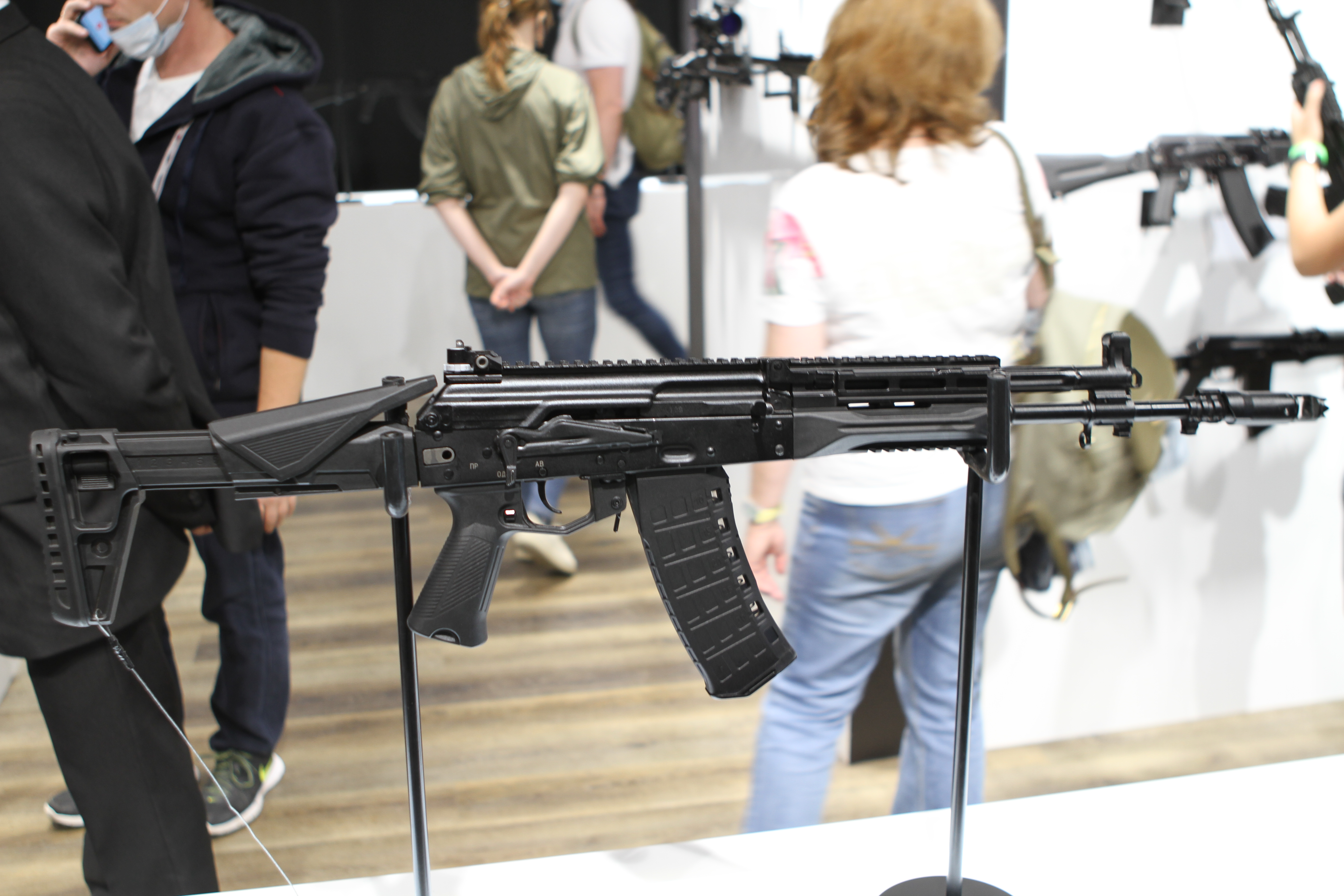
AK-12 (2021 model) with the additional cheek riser at the ARMY-2021 exhibition

At the ARMY-2020 exhibition, ergonomic upgrades of the AK-12 was revealed. The updates are no major redesign, but centred around ergonomic improvements such as a lightweight polymer L-shaped side-folding telescoping 6 position shoulder stock which is adjustable for length of pull, ergonomic polymer pistol grip and trigger guard unit, and updated rotary dioptre rear sight.

At the ARMY-2021 exhibition, an optional cheek riser with sight axis height adjustable comb piece for ergonomic preferences was shown on the shoulder stock.

=== AK-12 (2023 model) ===
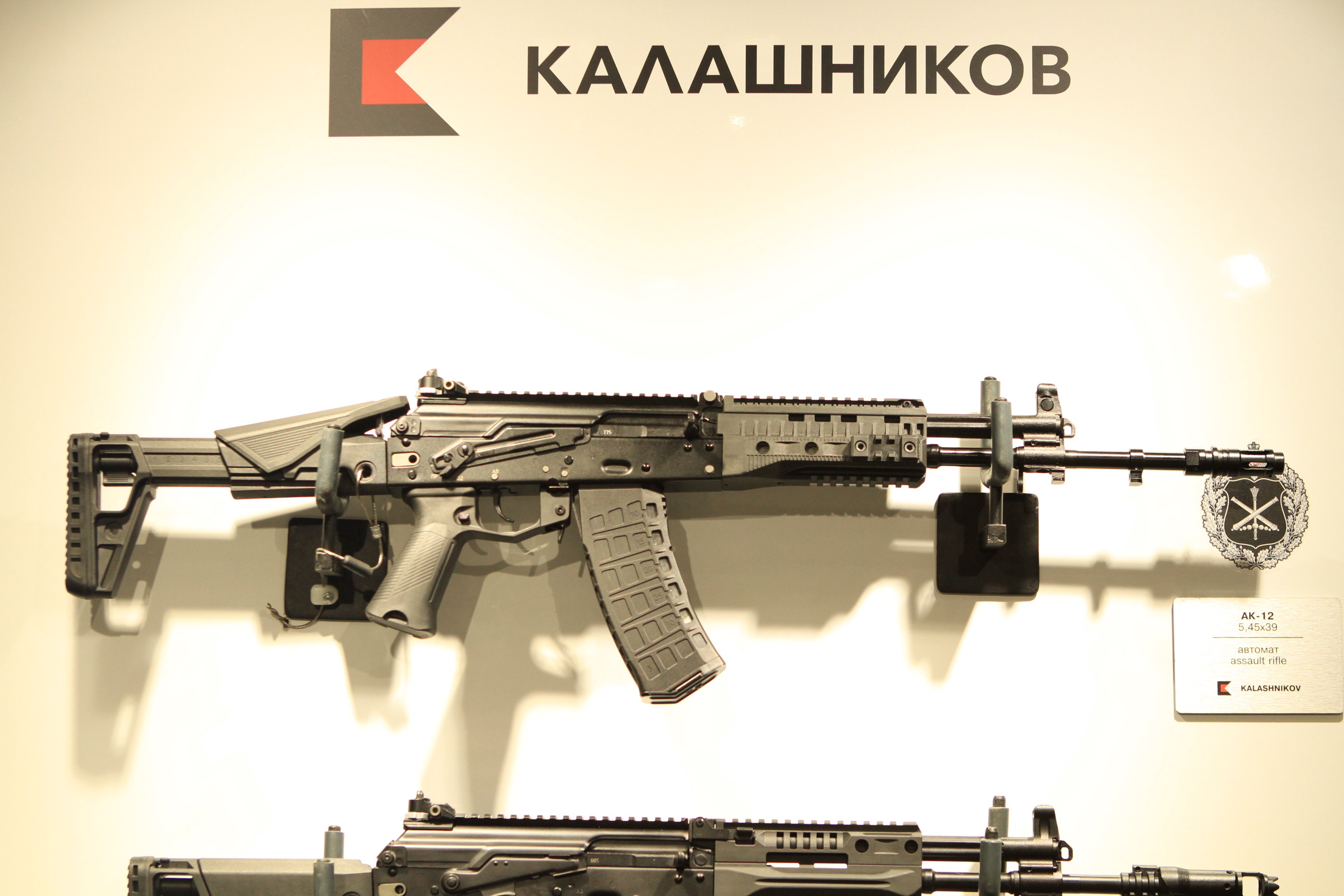
AK-12 (2023 model) displayed during ARMY-2023 exhibition

Kalashnikov Concern unveiled a further improved version of the AK-12 in January 2023.

The AK-12 (2023 model) entered serial production in December 2023. According to Kalashnikov Concern, another shipment of the AK-12 (2023 model) was made in April 2024, and a "substantial" batch was delivered in July 2026.

The improvements and changes on the AK-12 (2023 model):

- The muzzle brake device with a bayonet mount was replaced by a birdcage-type flash suppressor that features slots for a quick detachable sound suppressor that is mounted over the flash suppressor.
- New handguard. Due to prior complaints about old AK-12 handguard, the new one will be significantly strengthened and will be less susceptible to overheating during intense shooting.
- New, third iteration of the iron sights line.
- New safety mechanism. The AK-12 (2023 model) is equipped with a new safety switch with an ambidextrous flag.
- A bolt frame stop has been introduced into the trigger mechanism, which prevents the cocking handle from coming into contact with the curtain and its deformation during strong impacts with the back of the butt or the rear receiver liner.
- Grip from the 2020-2021 version.
- Stock from the 2020-2021 version.
- Based on the Russian military’s experience with the AK-12 during the Russian invasion of Ukraine, the 2-round burst firing mode has been omitted in the 2023 model, as it did not significantly contribute to the AK-12's efficiency.

=== AK-12SP and AK-12SPK ===
During the ARMY-2021 exhibition, Kalashnikov Concern displayed the AK-12SP (standard-length barrelled) and AK-12SPK (short-barrelled) prototypes developed for Russian special forces use. The AK-12SP features lower and upper aluminium upper handguard/gas tube covers with M-LOK slots for direct accessory attachment onto the "negative space" (hollow slot) mounting points. The AK-12SPK features an AK-12 pattern lower handguard with an aluminium upper handguard/gas tube cover that has M-LOK slots. The AK-12SP and AK-12SPK have excluded the 2-round burst mode.

=== AK-15 ===
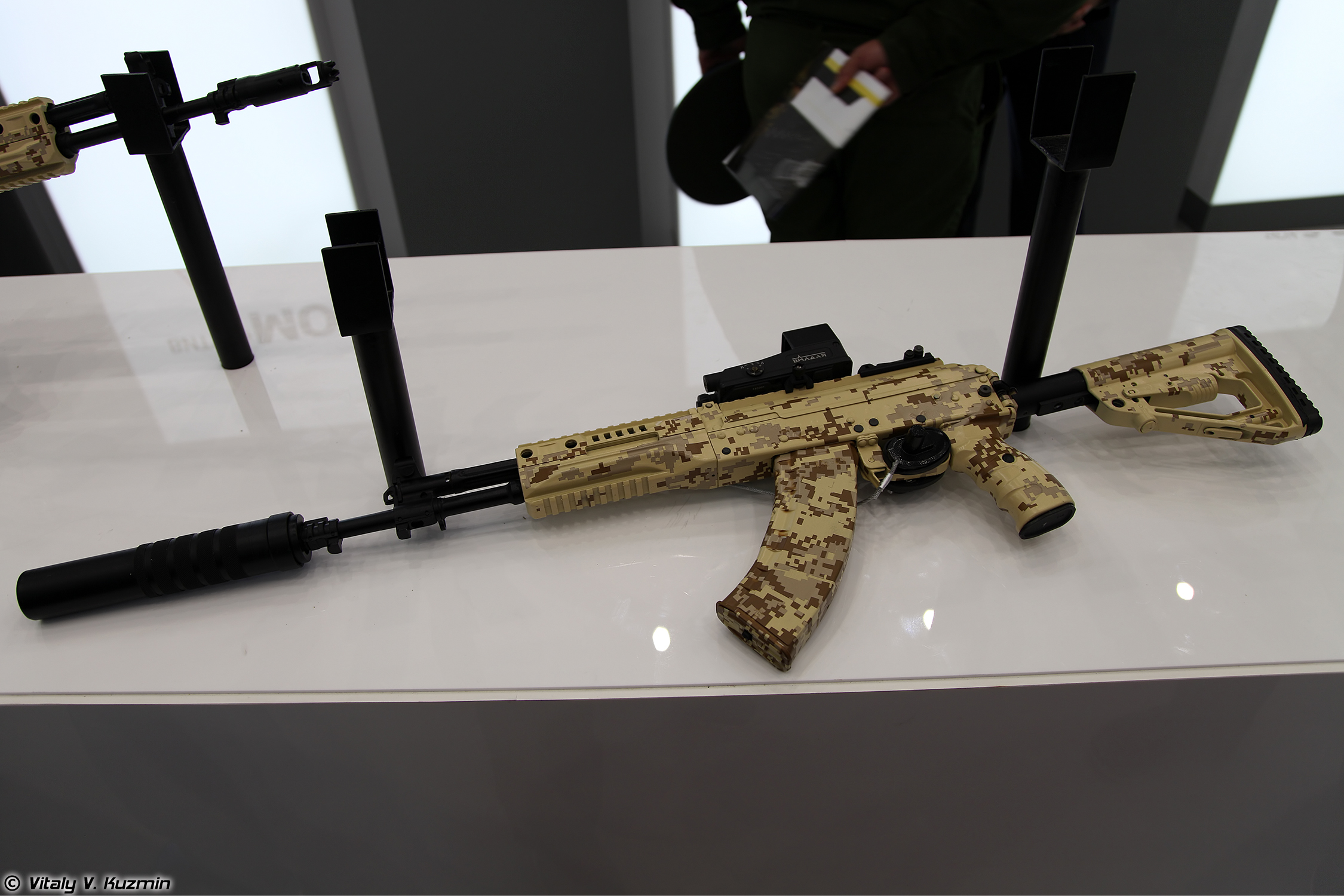
AK-15 with a sound suppressor displayed at ARMY-2016

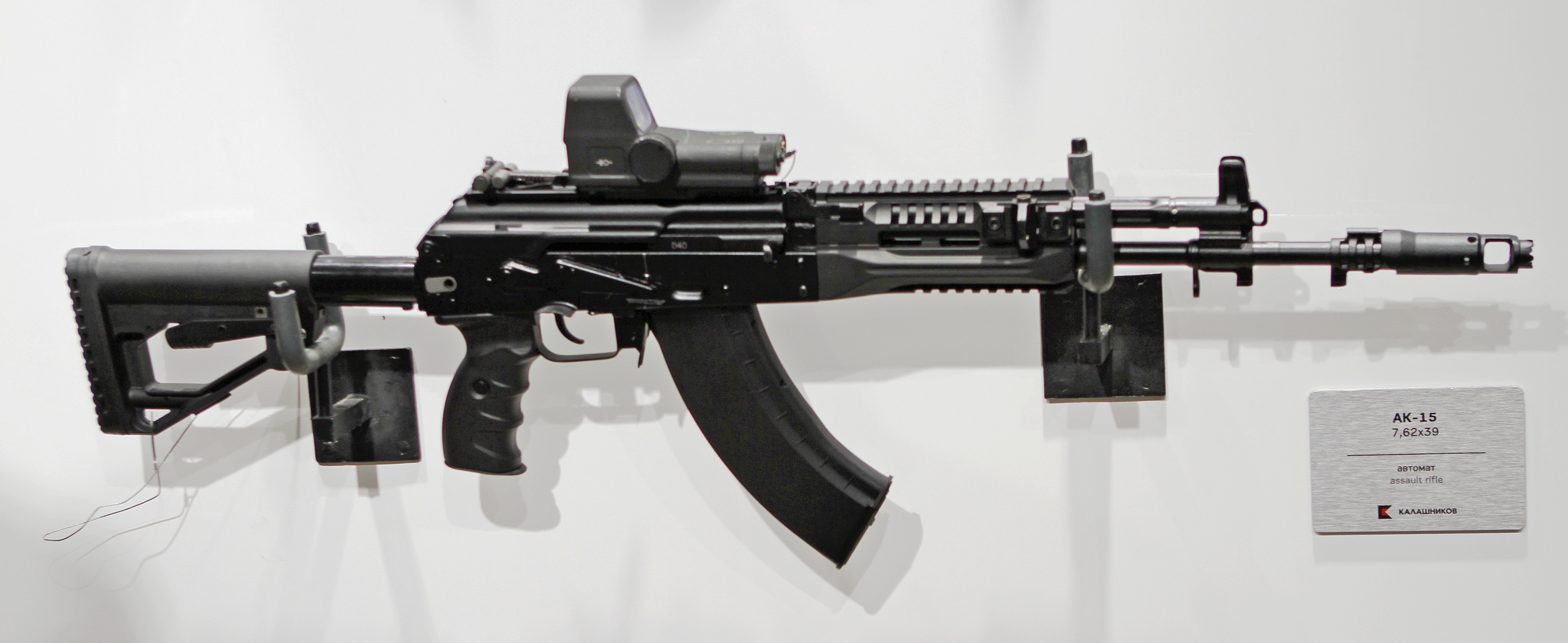
AK-15 with a 1P87 reflex sight

The AK-15 (GRAU index 6P71) is a variant of the AK-12 chambered in 7.62×39mm. Both the AK-12 and AK-15 have been developed by the Kalashnikov Concern under the "Ratnik" program and have been accepted into Russian military service. The AK-15 weighs 3.75 kg (8.27 lb) when empty, a full-length of 940 mm (37 in), a barrel length of 415 mm (16.3 in), barrel twist rate of 265 mm (10.4 in), and a standard magazine capacity of 30 rounds.

In January 2022, Directorate General of Defence Purchase floated a tender for 2,000 AK-15s for the Bangladesh Army.

=== AK-12K and AK-15K ===
The AK-12K and AK-15K (Russian: АК-12К, АК-15К), advertised in English by Kalashnikov Concern as AK-12C and AK-15C, are short-barrelled variants of the AK-12 and AK-15 respectively, designed for special forces and urban combat. Both feature a 290 mm (11.4 in) barrel, providing improved manoeuvrability in confined spaces while retaining the ergonomics and Picatinny rails of the 2023-model AK-12.

Kalashnikov Concern first displayed prototypes of the AK-12K and AK-15K, which are short-barrelled variants of the AK-12 and AK-15 respectively at the ARMY-2017 exhibition.

In early 2025, the Russian Ministry of Defence ordered a large batch of the AK-12Ks for assault and airborne units, which is expected to be delivered in spring of 2025. On 21 May 2025, Kalashnikov Concern's CEO stated that the first batch had been shipped. He also noted that the rifles were ordered in MultiCam camouflage pattern.

=== AK-12SK and AK-15SK ===
The AK-12SK and AK-15SK (Russian: АК-12СК, АК-15СК), advertised in English by Kalashnikov Concern as AK-12SC and AK-15SC, are sub-compact variants of the AK-12K and AK-15K respectively, which both feature a 228 mm (9 in) barrel length. Both were unveiled at January 2025 at IDEX 2025.

=== AK-19 ===
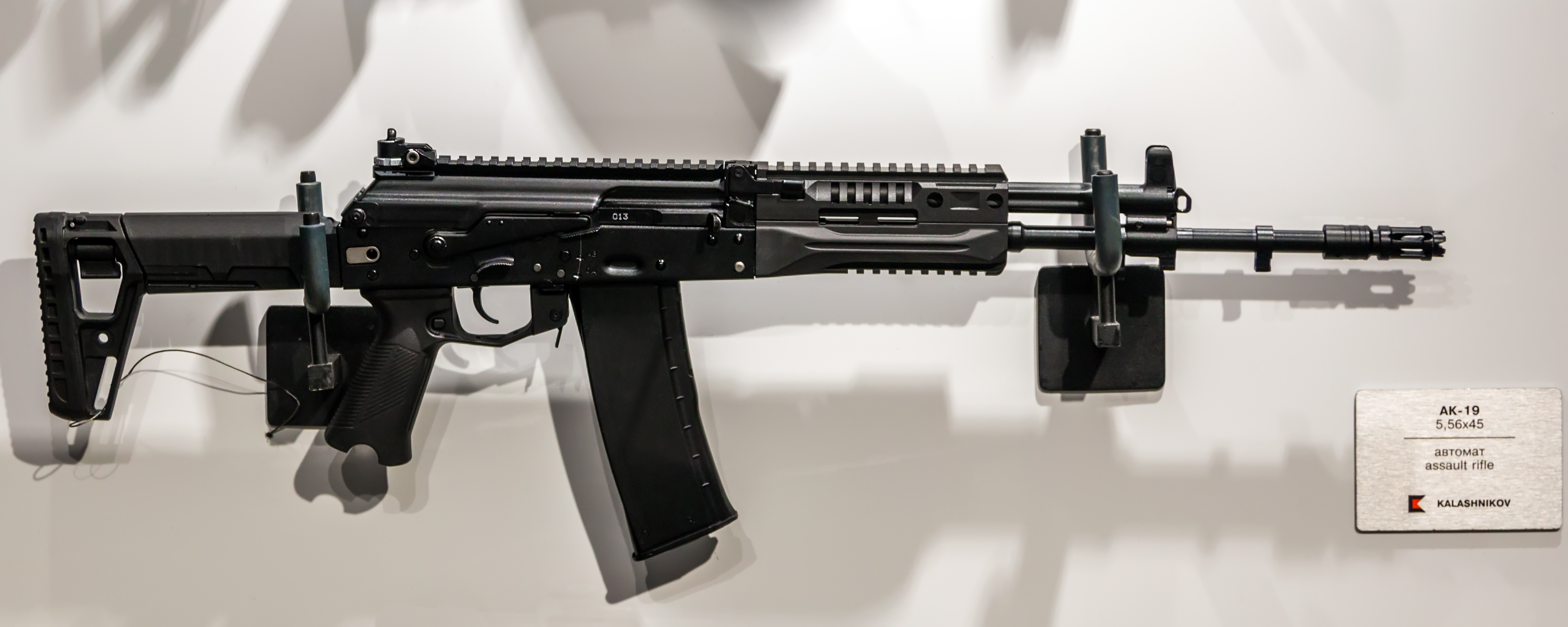
AK-19 displayed at the ARMY-2022 exhibition

The AK-19 is a variant of the AK-12 chambered in 5.56×45mm NATO cartridge, designed for the export market. It was revealed during the International Military-Technical Forum ARMY-2020 exhibition, then was later unveiled to the public during the IDEX 2021, and was put into series production in 2022.. Like the updated AK-12 (2020 model), that was also revealed during the ARMY-2020 exhibition, the AK-19 features a redesigned polymer L-shaped stock, a redesigned pistol grip and trigger guard, and a new rotary dioptre rear sight. The AK-19 also features a birdcage-type flash suppressor that features slots for a quick detachable sound suppressor. The rifle has a barrel length of 415 mm (16.3 in), a full length of 875–935 mm (34.4–36.8 in), an empty weight of 3.8 kg (8.38 lb), and uses either a proprietary 30-round box magazine or a 45-round RPK-21 box magazine.

=== AK-308 ===
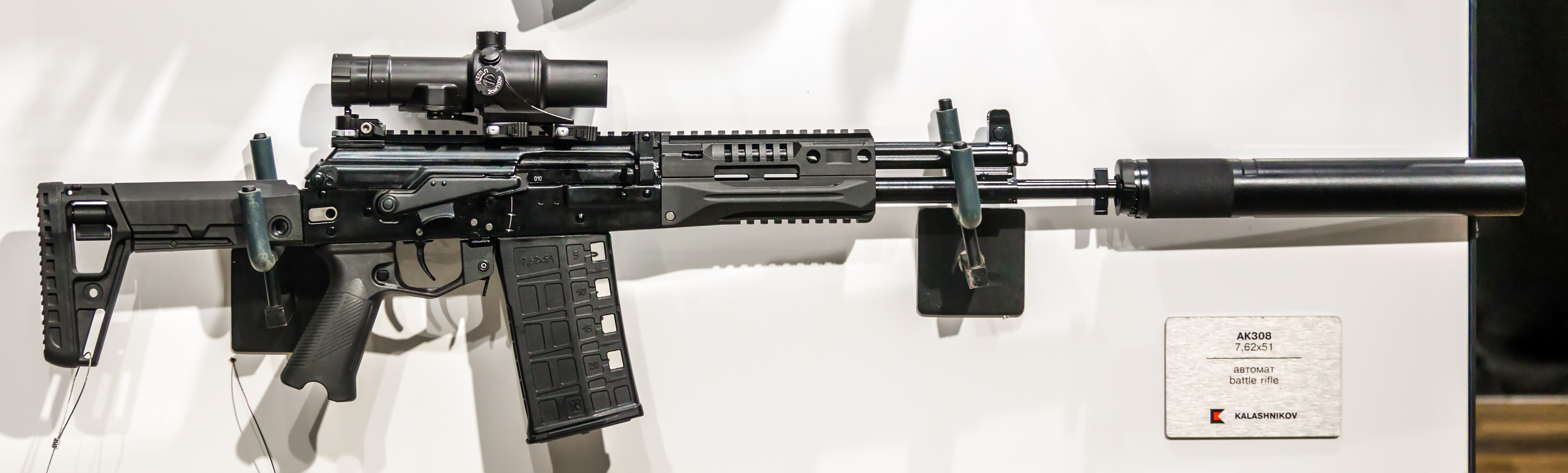
AK-308 with a suppressor at the ARMY-2022 exhibition

The AK-308 is a battle rifle that was first introduced in 2018 upon request of potential international clients outside Russia. It is based on the AK-15's design and is chambered in 7.62×51mm NATO (.308 Winchester). The basic Kalashnikov rifle design which is intended for intermediate calibres has been stretched and strengthened to handle the extra bolt thrust produced by a full-power ammunition.

The AK-308 has a cyclic rate of fire of 700 rounds per minute, features a 415 mm (16.3 in) long barrel, weighs 4.3 kg (9.48 lb) when empty, and uses a proprietary 20-round magazine. The full length of the rifle is 945 mm (37.2 in) and has an accuracy range of 800 m (875 yd). In addition, the AK-308 features a dioptre sight line and has the ability to attach accessories used by the AK-12.

=== AK-22 ===
The AK-22 is a prototype variant of the AK-12 chambered in the experimental 6.02×41mm cartridge that was revealed in 2023. There were two other cartridges that were tested alongside it, the 6.7×45mm, and 6.5×39mm. The AK-22 was intended to be Russia's competitor to the United States' NGSW program.

=== TR3 ===
The TR3 is a semi-automatic rifle based on the AK-12, intended for the civilian market.

== Derivatives ==
=== RPK-16 ===
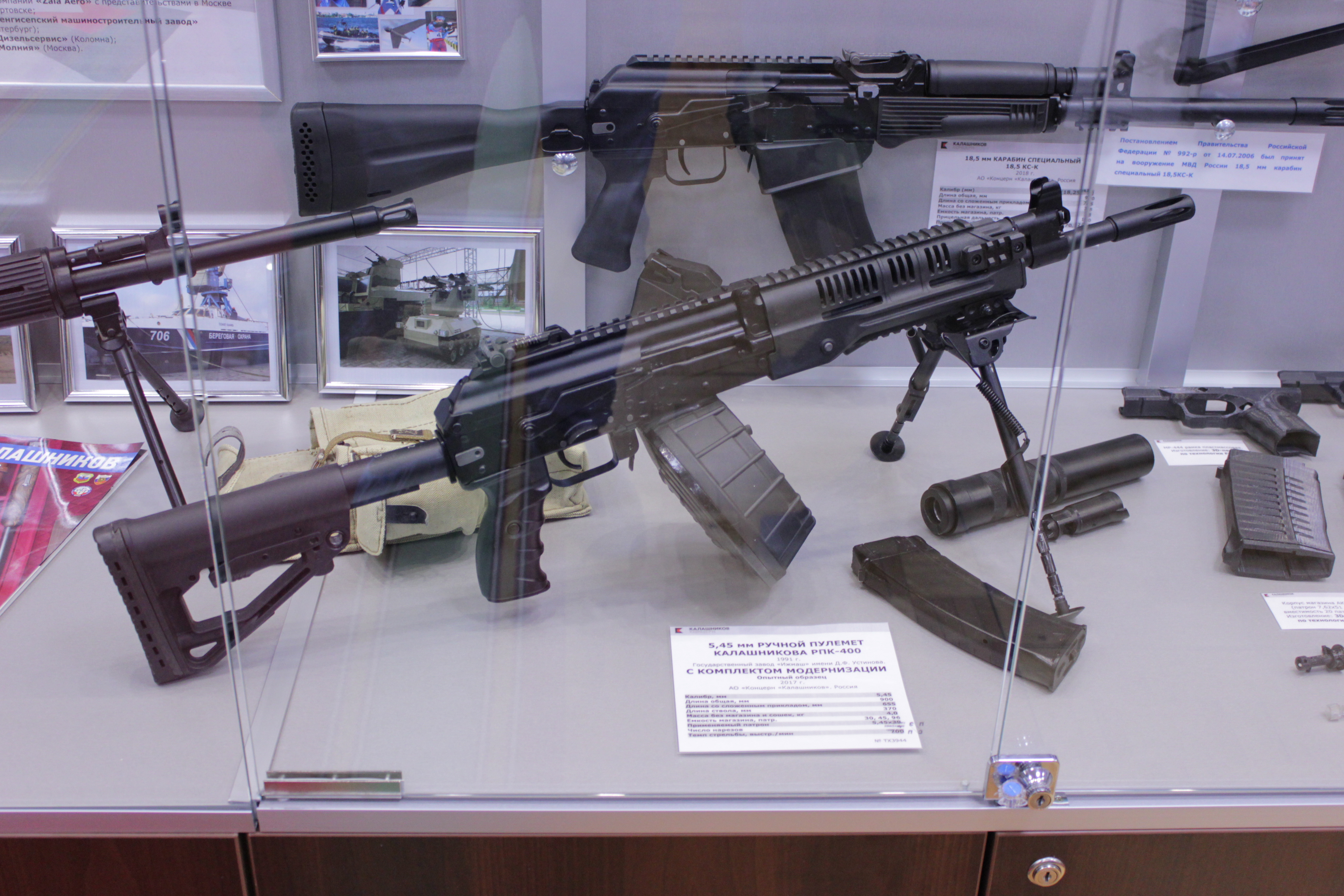
RPK-16 displayed at the Izhmash Museum in Izhevsk

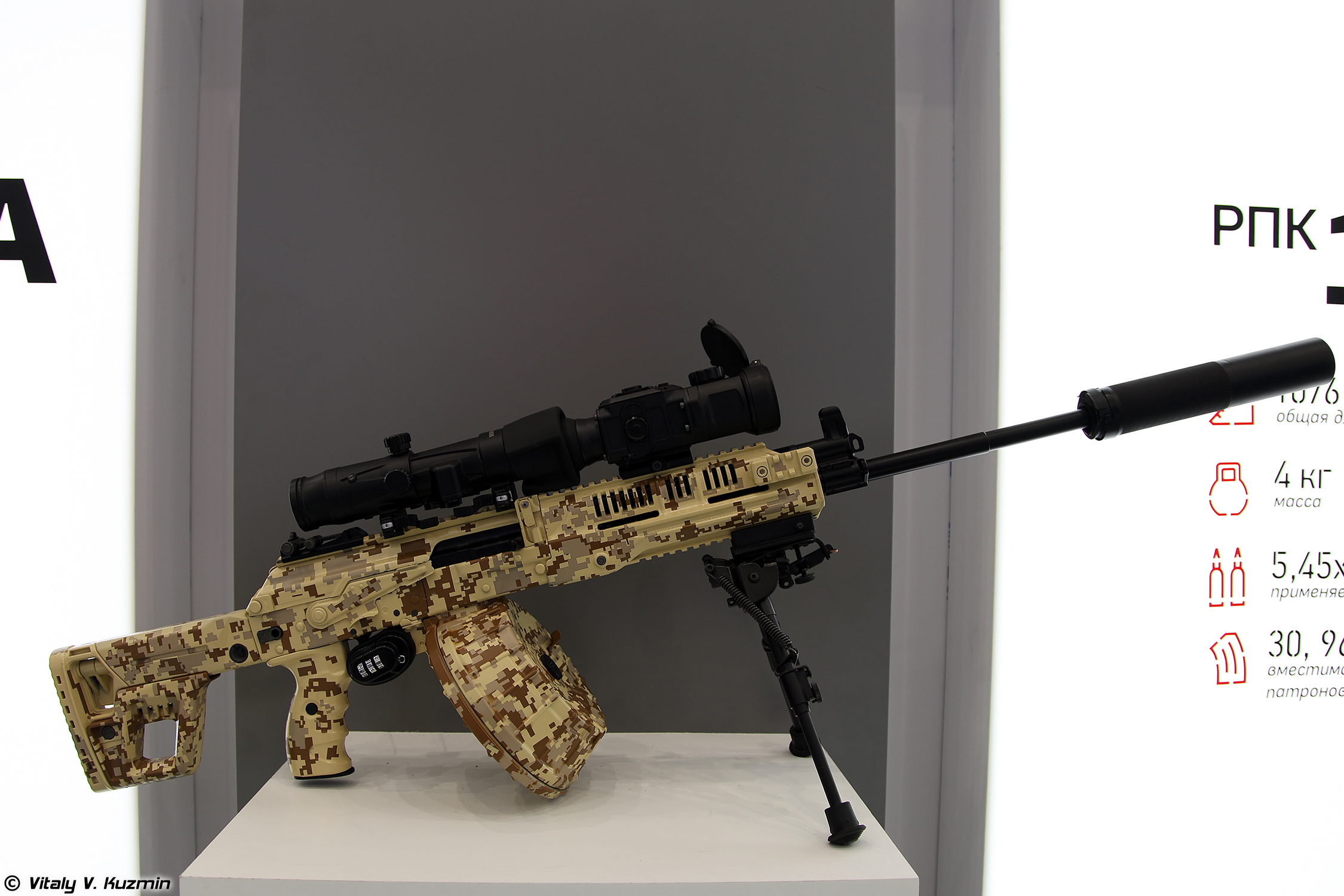
RPK-16 with a 95-round drum magazine and sound suppressor

The RPK-16 light machine gun (the number 16 indicates the year 2016, when the development first started) is Kalashnikov's response to the "Tokar-2" program, where it competed against Degtyaryov's submission. In 2018, the Ministry of Defence of the Russian Federation have signed a contract concerning the procurement of the RPK-16, and is expected to take over the role of the RPK-74 in the Russian Armed Forces.

The RPK-16 is based on the RPK-400 prototype, which shares similar design features with the AK-12 production model. It is chambered in 5.45×39mm and features the traditional Kalashnikov gas-operated long-stroke piston system, and shares several novel technical and ergonomic features derived from the AK-12 program. Picatinny rails on the top of the receiver and bottom of the handguard are used for mounting various optical sights and detachable bipods. Because of this, the fixed bipod of the RPK-74 is not needed. Other features of the RPK-16 include an ergonomic pistol grip, a folding buttstock, and two main barrel lengths: a 550 mm (21.7 in) long barrel (when it is applied or configured for the light machine gun role) and a 370 mm (14.6 in) short barrel (when it is applied or configured for the assault rifle role). Its design enables it to have interchangeable barrels that can easily be removed, and the ability to quickly attach a detachable suppressor. It has a combat weight of 6 kg (13.23 lb), a full-length of 1,076 mm (42.4 in), a cyclic rate of fire of 700 rounds per minute, and an accuracy range of 800 m (870 yd). It primarily uses a newly developed 95-round drum magazine and is backward compatible with box magazines from the AK-74 and RPK-74.

After receiving feedback on the performance of the weapon, the Kalashnikov Concern began development on the RPL-20 (20 indicating 2020) belt-fed light machine gun. It is also chambered in 5.45×39mm and has a very similar rate of fire and weight, but provides open-bolt operation and quick-change barrels to enhance sustained fire. Kalashnikov Concern has so far created at least one functional prototype. If adopted, the gun will become the first light machine gun to be used by Russian forces since the RPD that isn't magazine-fed or of the standard Kalashnikov pattern.

=== AK-200 rifle family ===
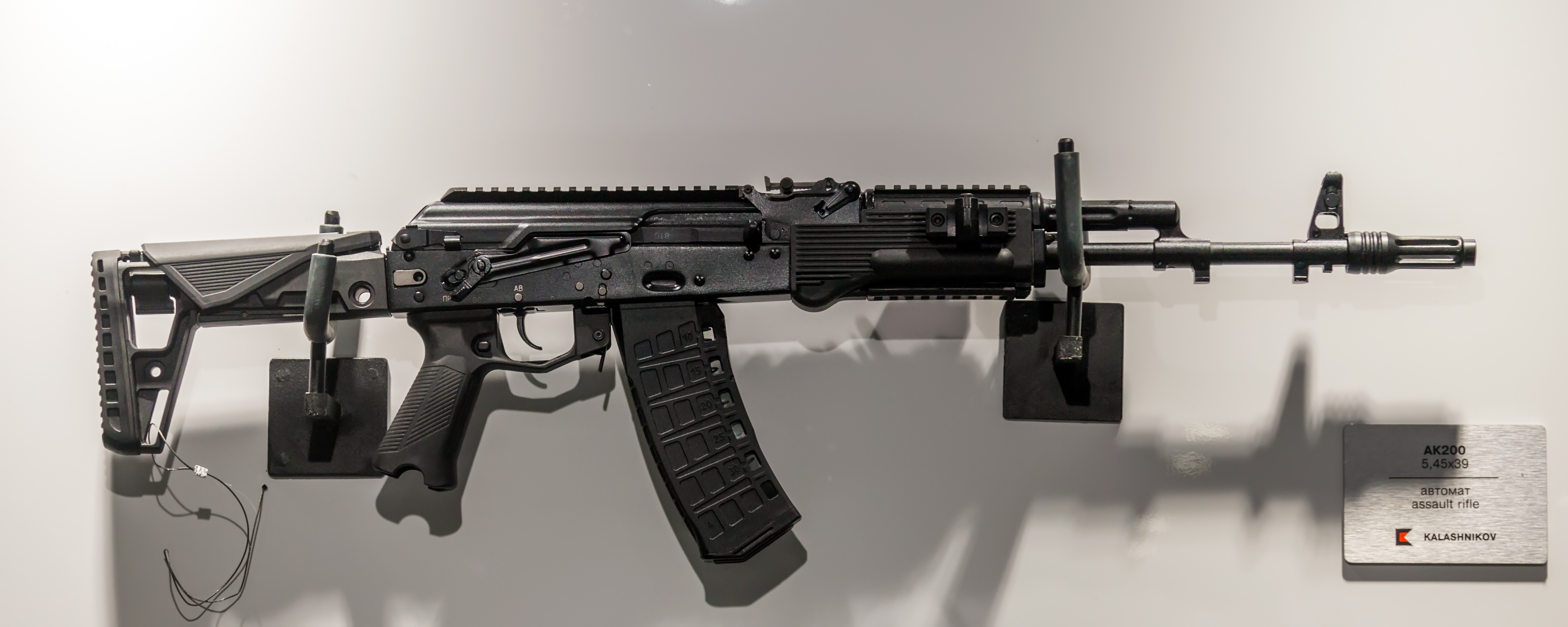
AK-200 at the ARMY-2022 exhibition

The development of the AK-200 rifle family was halted around 2011 but resumed in around 2016. While the AK-200 series is somewhat heavier and less advanced compared to the AK-12 series, it is also more cost-effective. As of 2018, 200-series Kalashnikov assault rifles, which include a complete family, are offered for export sales and for domestic law enforcement users. The AK-200 series of rifles are based on the AK-100 rifle series and the AK-12. They can be chambered in 5.45×39mm, 5.56×45mm NATO and 7.62×39mm, and use a barrel and gas system assembly and iron sights line similar to that of the AK-74M/AK-100 rifle family. AK-12 alike improvements added include Picatinny rails, a new pistol grip, a new adjustable buttstock and a new flash hider. They feed from 30-round magazines, and can be compatible with drum magazines from the RPK and RPK-74.

The models are designated, as follows:

Chambering	Assault rifle	Carbine
5.45×39mm	AK-200	AK-205
5.56×45mm NATO	AK-201	AK-202
7.62×39mm	AK-203	AK-204

AK-200 series assault rifles are supplied to government customers in Russia and are also ready to be exported. Russia and India on March 3, 2019, inaugurated a plant that will produce AK-203 assault rifles.

=== AKV-521 ===
In November 2020, Kalashnikov Concern first unveiled the prototype of the AKV-521, a semi-automatic only rifle that features a two-receiver layout, and was later showcased at the ARMY-2021 exhibition. While the AKV-521 is likely to attract interest from various Russian and foreign military and law enforcement units, it is currently marketed as a civilian rifle.

=== AKV-721 ===
Kalashnikov Concern unveiled the AKV-721 at ARMY-2022, a 7.62×51mm NATO variant of the AKV-521.

== Gallery ==
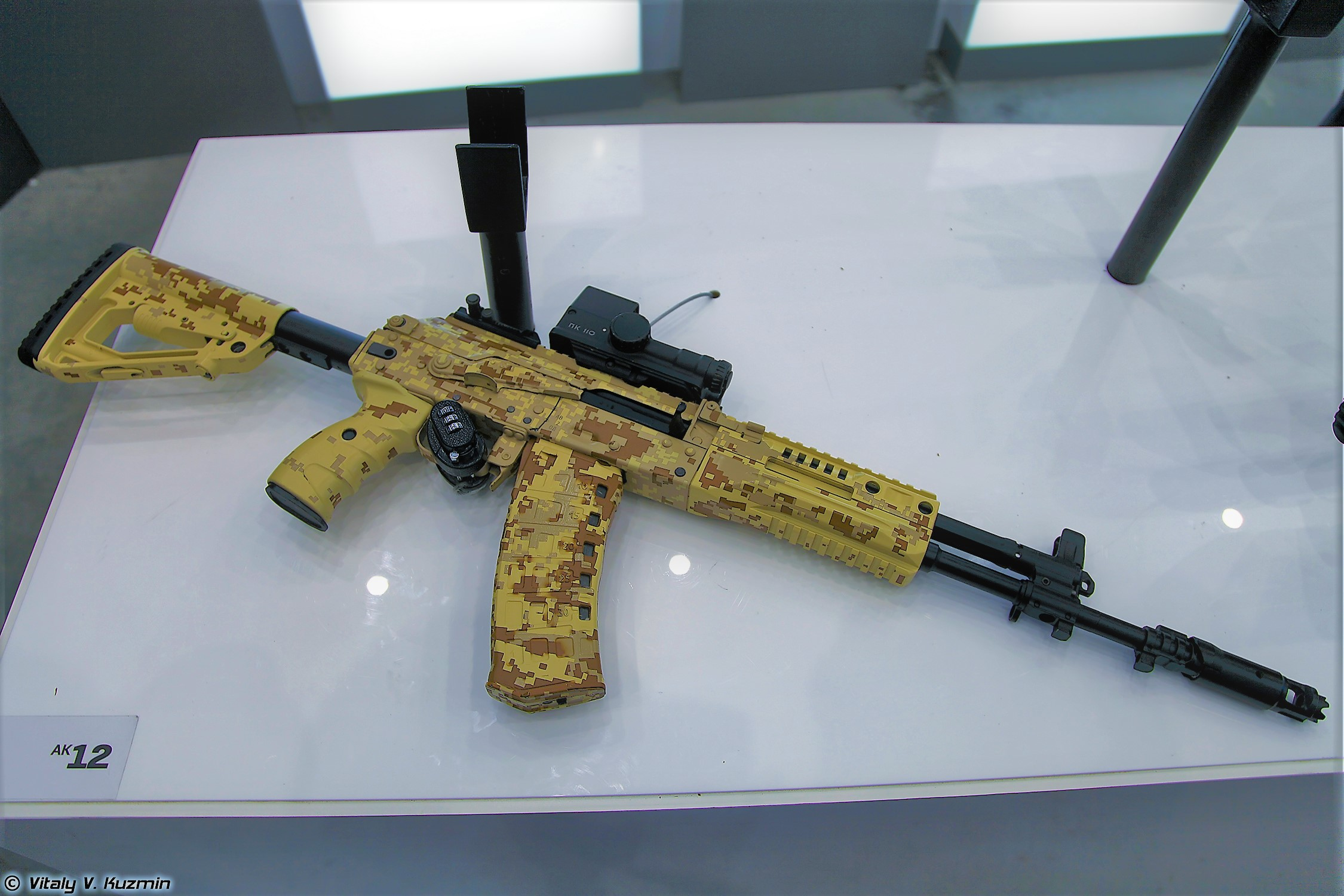
Final production model of the AK-12 (GRAU index 6P70) displayed at ARMY-2016

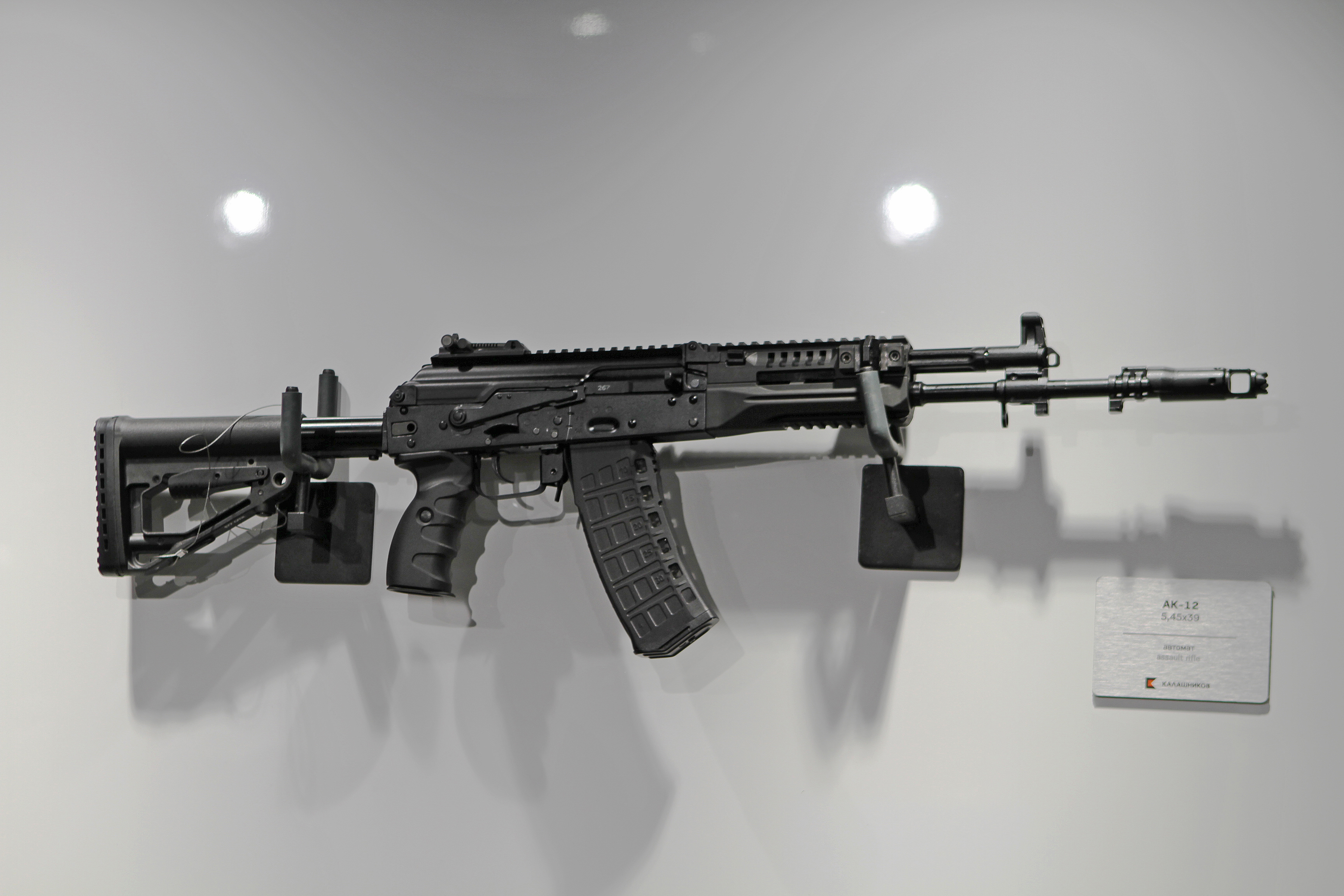
Final production model of the AK-12 that is intended for industrial mass-production

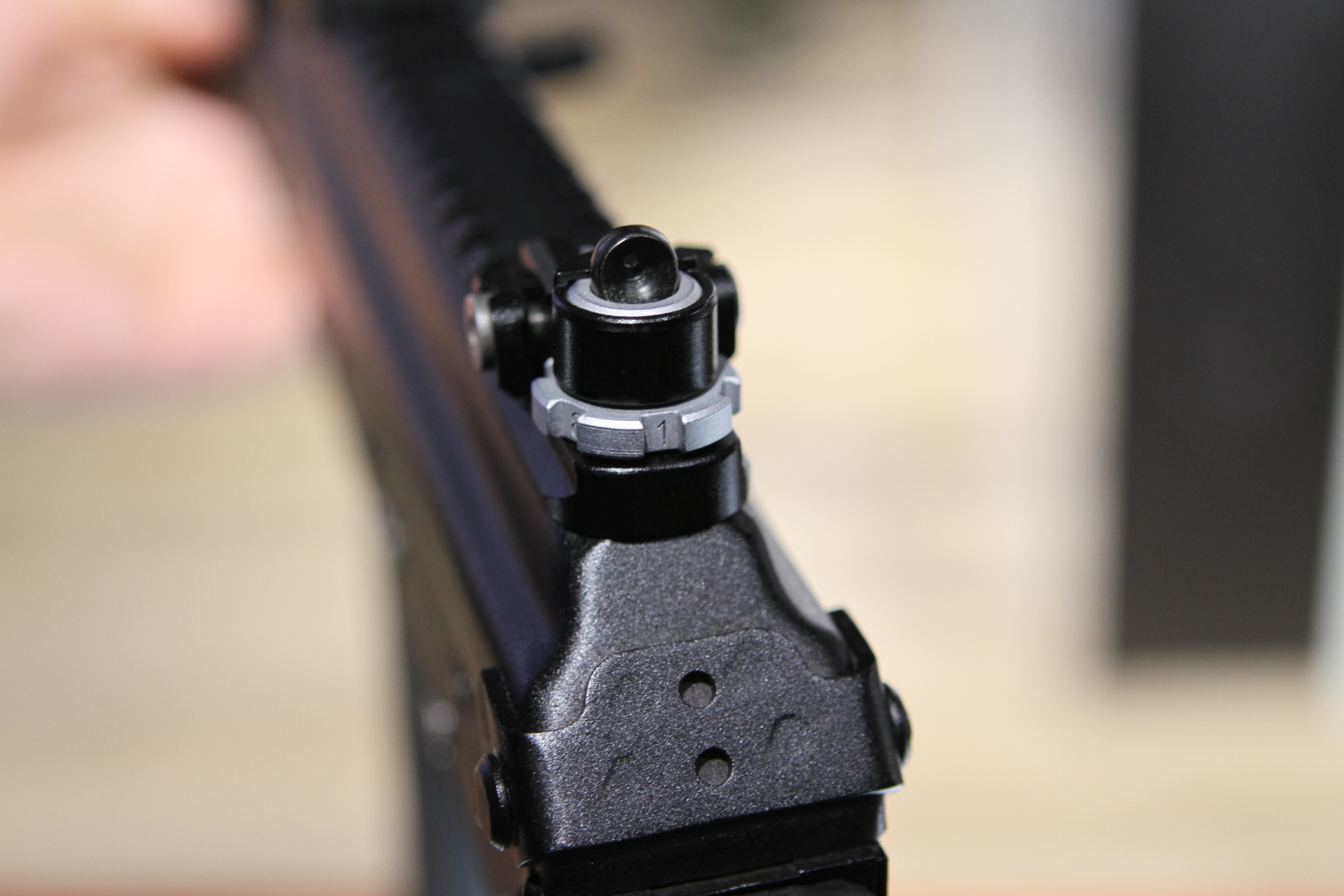
Redesigned rotary diopter rear sight of the AK-12 (2020 model)

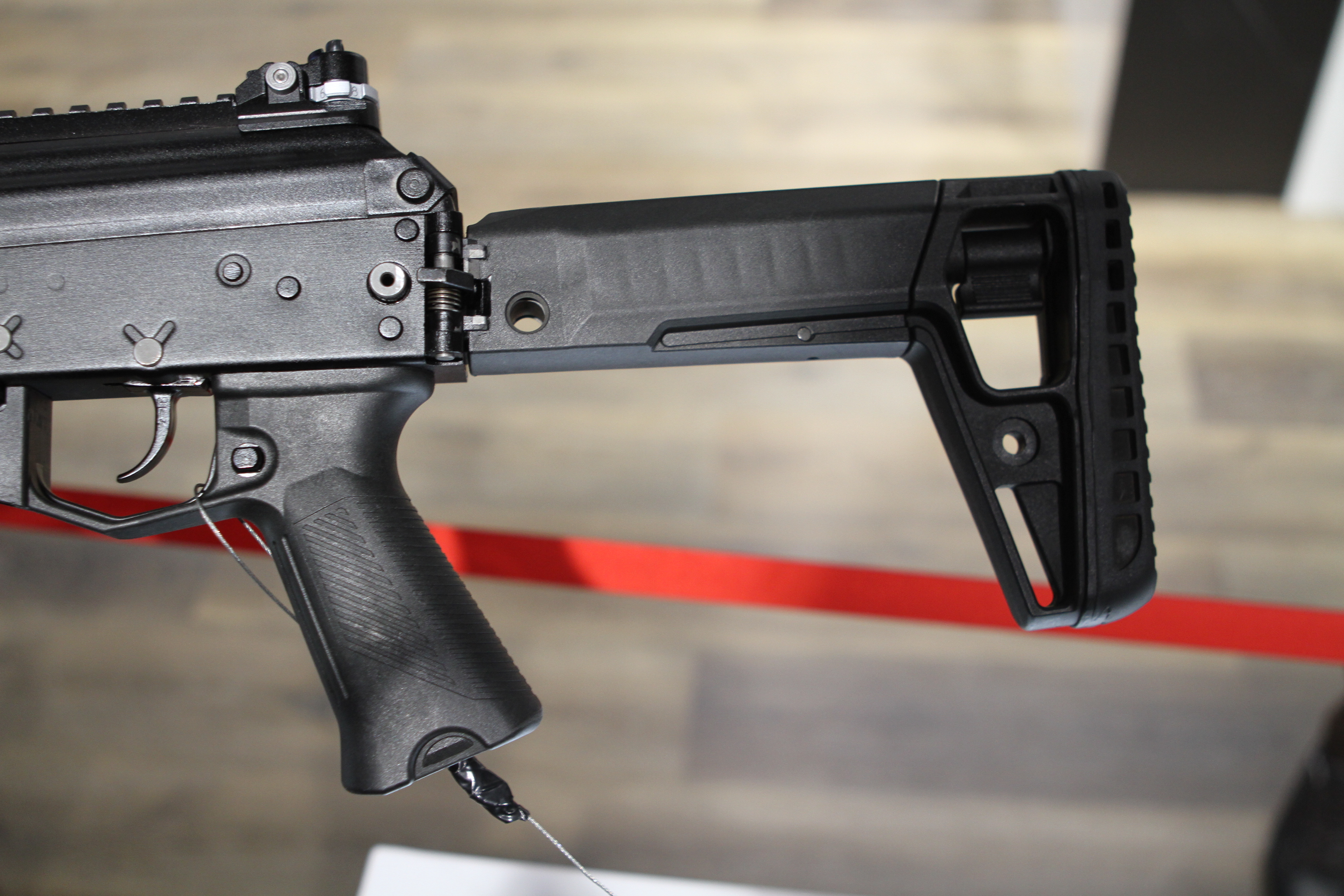
Redesigned lightweight polymer L-shaped shoulder stock and a polymer pistol grip and trigger guard unit of the AK-12 (2020 model)

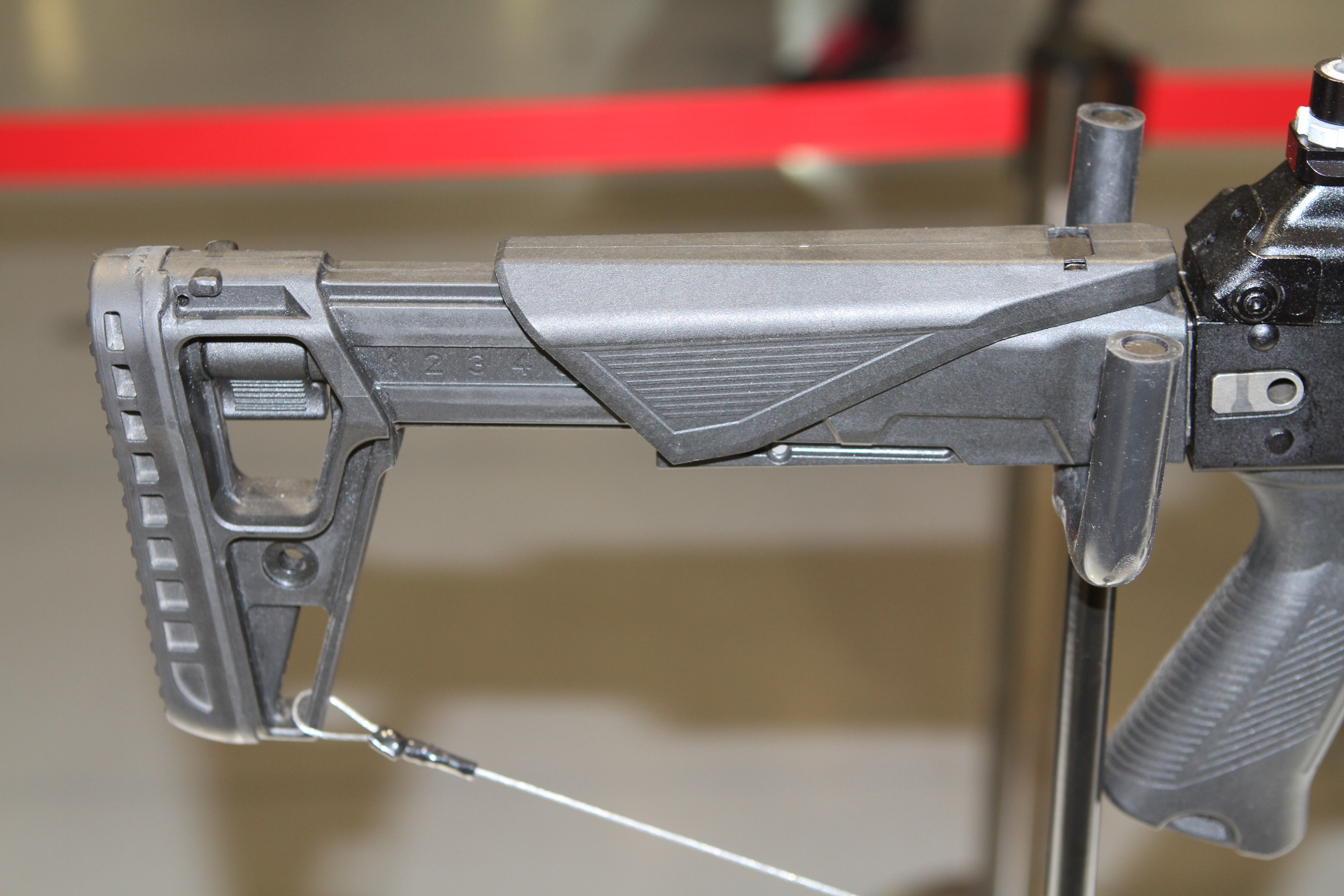
Optional cheek riser of the AK-12 (2021 model)

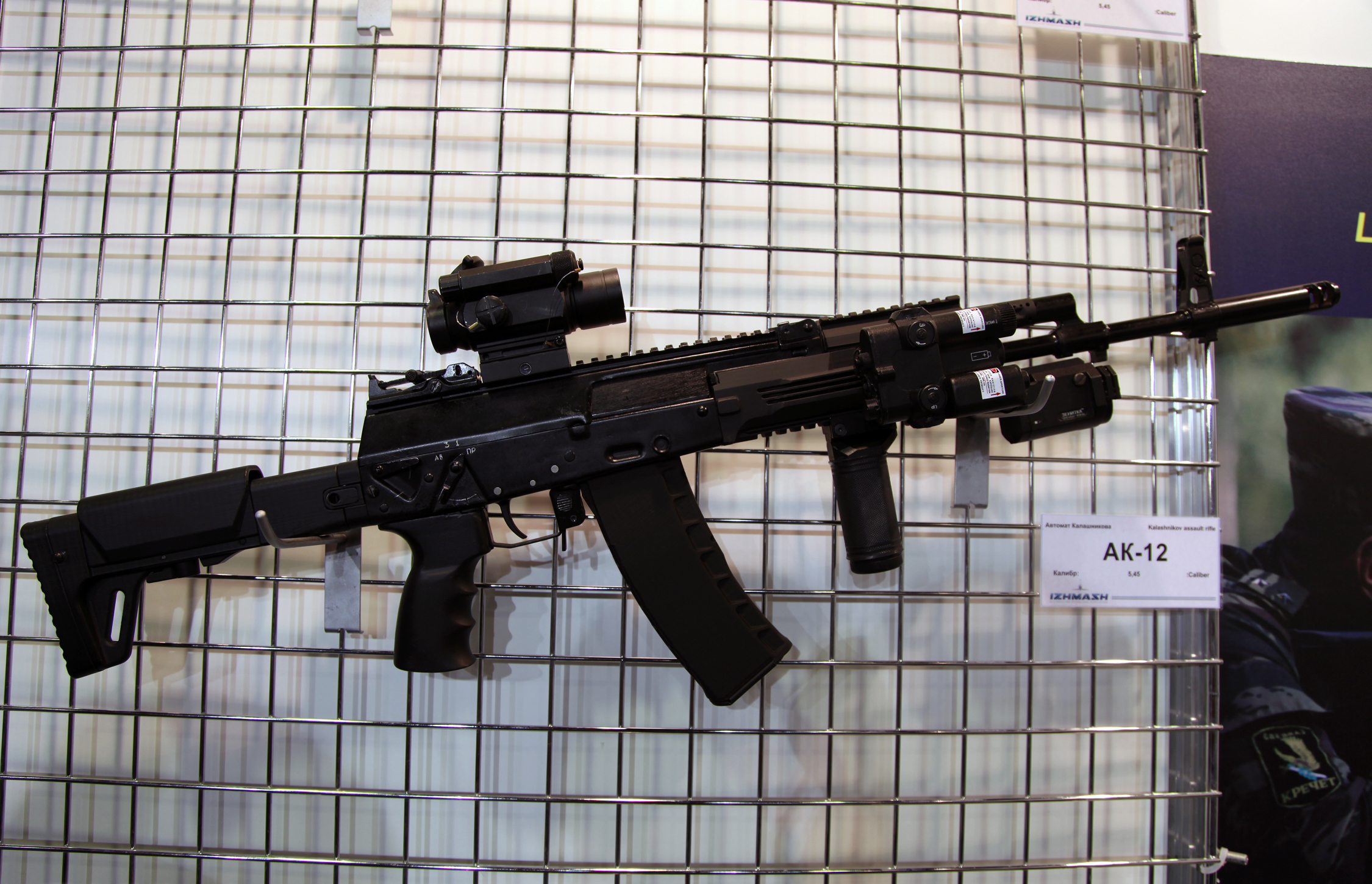
2012 prototype of the AK-12

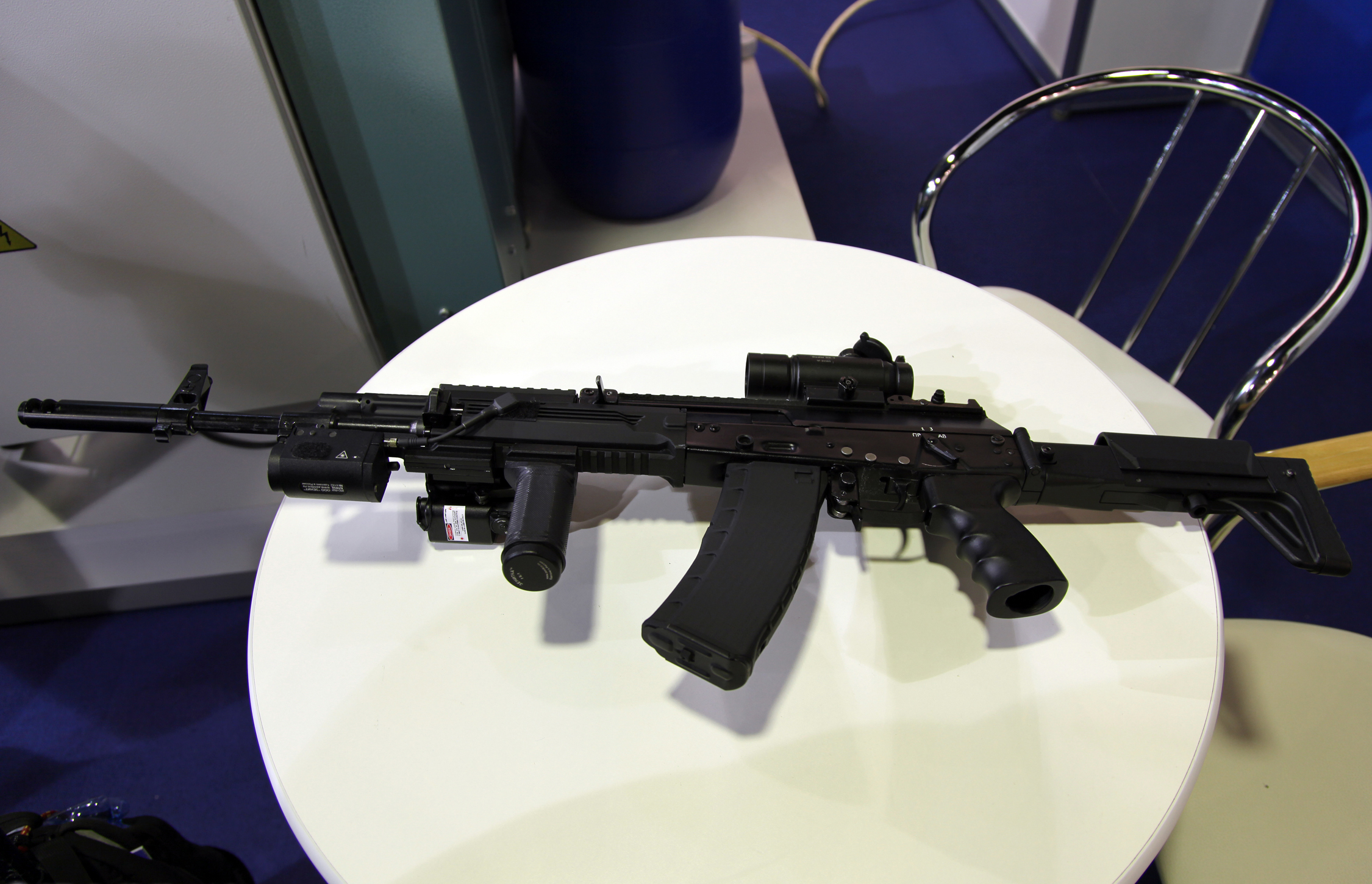
Ambidextrous ejection port and reversible charging handle above the vertical foregrip of the 2012 prototype of the AK-12

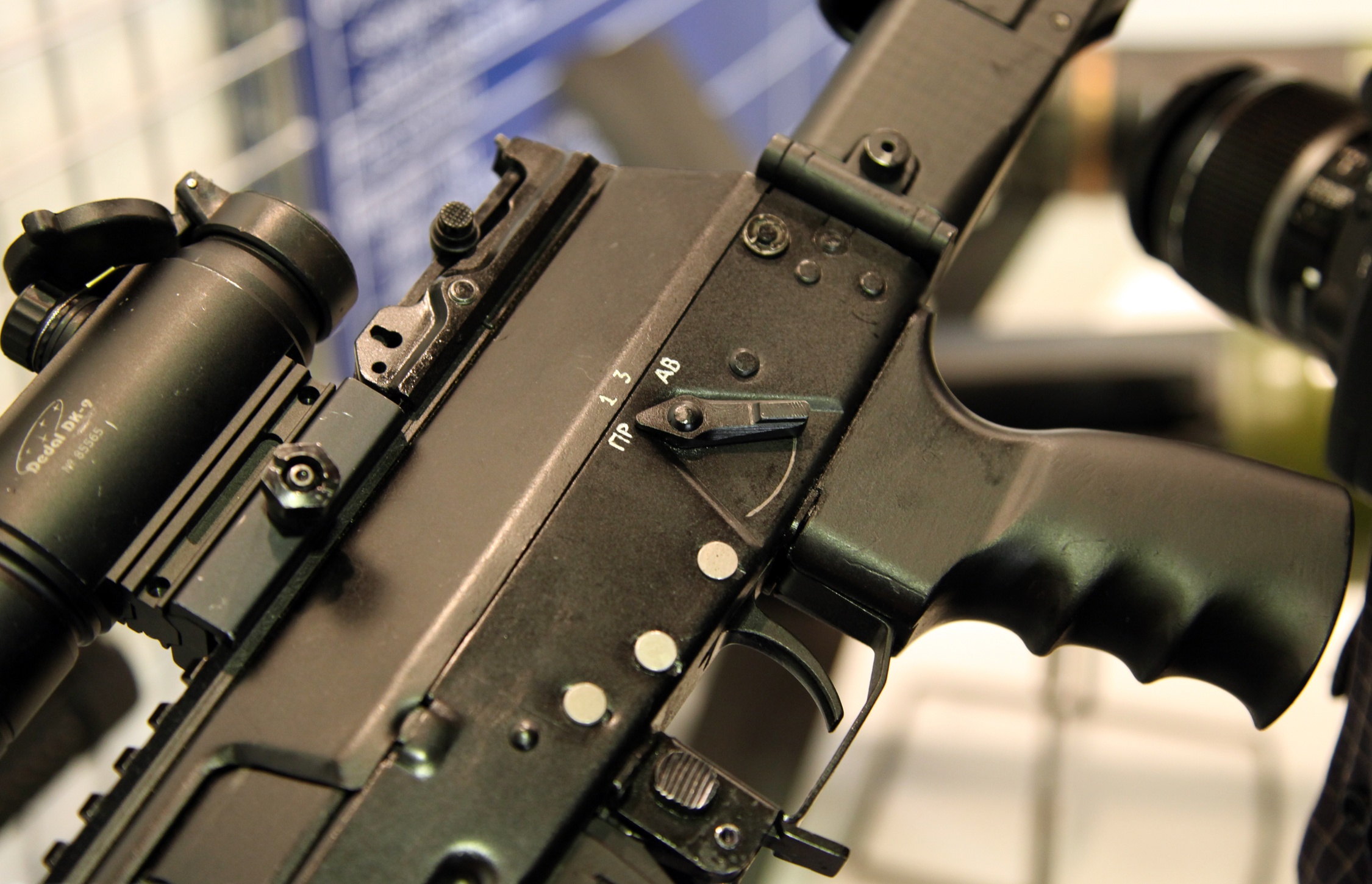
Ambidextrous fire selector, push-button magazine release and ejection port of the 2012 prototype of the AK-12

AK-12 with GP-46 underbarrel grenade launcher at ISF 2026 forum

AK-12C at ISF 2026 forum

AK-12SC at ISF 2026 forum

AK-19C at ISF 2026 forum

== Users ==
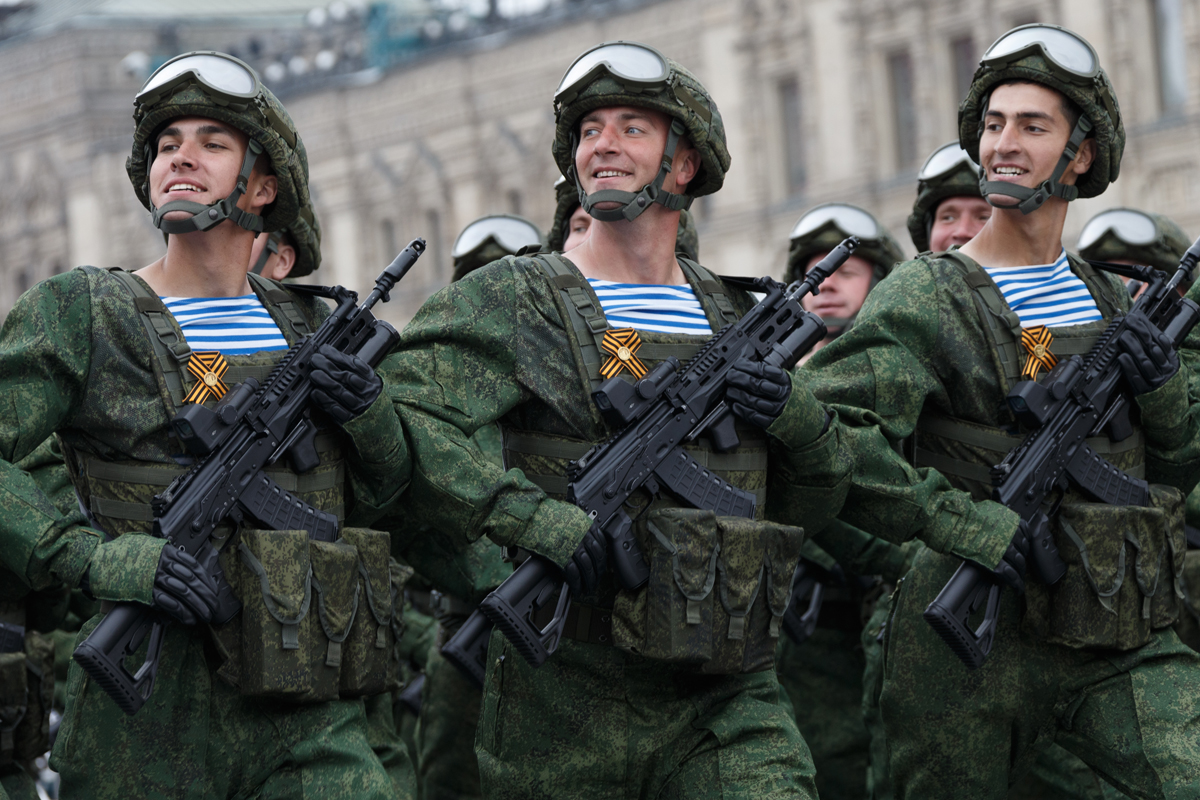
Russian Airborne Troops carrying AK-12s fitted with 1P87 reflex sights and GP-25 grenade launchers at the 2019 Moscow Victory Day Parade

- Armenia: In August 2018 at the Army-2018 defence exhibition, the Armenian Ministry of Defence signed an agreement and secured the rights to manufacture the AK-12 and AK-15 assault rifles in Armenia. In 2019. they had 50 rifles for testing from Kalashnikov Concern. In 2021, Armenian Special Forces are seen using AK-12 rifles in a military training exercise.
- Belarus: A small quantity of AK-12s reportedly announced for purchase in February 2021. In service with the Unit 3214 of the Internal Troops of Belarus.
- North Korea: In November 2024, it was reported that North Korean troops deployed to Russia prior to being assigned for frontline operations involving Ukraine are issued AK-12s. It was confirmed in early 2025 that captured North Koreans were reported to be armed with AK-12s.
- Qatar: AK-12 rifles in service with Qatari Emiri Forces shown on parade in December 2018.
- Russia: The AK-12 (official GRAU designation 6P70), based on the AK-400 prototype, alongside AK-15 (6P71), were accepted into service in January 2018. The first deliveries of 2,500 AK-12 assault rifles as part of the state defence order began in December 2018. The Russian Ministry of Defence has signed a three-year contract with the Kalashnikov Concern for 150,000 AK-12 and AK-15 assault rifles to be delivered in 2019, 2020 and 2021. According to the Kalashnikov Concern on 20 August 2020 the Russian Defence Ministry is the main customer of the AK-12, which will gradually replace the AK-74M in the army and it is also being exported to some unspecified countries from near abroad. 37,600 were delivered in 2020. A new contract was signed in August 2021 and tens of thousands of rifles were reportedly produced during the year. The AK-12 has also entered service with the military subdivisions of the National Guard of Russia. The Kalashnikov Concern and Russia's Defence Ministry have signed a contract in February 2018 on the delivery of the newest RPK-16 light machine gun. Based on the results of the pilot operation and combat use begun developing a new light machine gun. In November 2023, Kalashnikov fulfilled the 3-year contract with Ministry of Defence on delivery of AK-12 rifles. The AK-12 and AK-15 entered service with the Russian "Interior Affairs Organs" in late 2023. Kalashnikov Concern said in December 2023 that it had nearly doubled the supplies of AK-12 rifles over the previous year. Unknown number were also acquired by allied Russian rebels in Ukraine. Kalashnikov Concern delivered the first batch of upgraded AK-12s to the Russian Armed Forces in January 2025 under state contracts. In production as of 2026.
- Ukraine: Captured AK-12s were used in limited numbers during the 2022 Russian invasion of Ukraine by Ukrainian forces, such as the Territorial Defense Forces, airborne and Special Operations Forces units.

=== Former user ===
- Ba'athist Syria: Used by 25th SMF Division of the Syrian Arab Army.
