= Indo-Russia Rifles =

Rifle factory in Uttar Pradesh, India

Coordinates: 26°12′44″N 81°49′22″E

Indo-Russia Rifles Private Limited
- Industry: Defence
- Founded: 2019; 7 years ago
- Headquarters: Korwa, Amethi, India
- Key people: Major General SK Sharma, SM(Bar), VSM (CEO&MD)
- Products: AK-203
- Owners: Advanced Weapons and Equipment India (42.5%); Munitions India (8%); Kalashnikov Concern (42%); Rosoboronexport (7.5%)
- Website: irrpl.co.in

Indo-Russia Rifles Private Limited (IRRPL) is a rifle-manufacturing facility in Korwa, Amethi district in the Indian state of Uttar Pradesh. Founded in 2019, the factory manufactures the AK-200 variant of the Kalashnikov family of rifles.

== History ==
The Indian Armed Forces had been equipped with a locally produced licensed copy of the L1A1 self-loading rifles from the late 1950s. In the mid-1980s, a decision was taken to develop a 5.56×45mm NATO calibre rifle to replace the obsolete rifles. Trials on various prototypes based on the AKM were carried out by the Armament Research and Development Establishment (ARDE) in Pune. On the completion of the trial, The Indian Small Arms System (INSAS) was adopted in 1990, becoming the standard-issue assault rifle of the Indian infantry. However, to phase out the still in use bolt-action Lee–Enfield rifles as quickly as possible, India had to acquire 100,000 7.62×39mm AKM-type rifles from Russia, Hungary, Romania and Israel in 1990–92.

The INSAS was initially built with features borrowed from several different rifles and was not made to meet the specific requirements of the Indian security forces. This design, while serving the Army for over 30 years, started to fall behind the needs of modern warfare. In recent years the rifle has come under increasing scrutiny, with several issues surfacing from frontline forces that have inhibited operational capabilities. For example, the plastic magazine of the rifle has repeatedly cracked under cold weather conditions and has reportedly even overheated during long battles leading to malfunctions, making it an unreliable choice for a standard-issue rifle.

Due to these repeated downfalls, in April 2015, the Indian government had to replace some INSAS rifles of the CRPF with AKM variants to ensure greater success against the Naxalite–Maoist insurgency. Therefore, owing to these failures and the changing needs of the armed forces, it was announced in early 2017 that the INSAS rifles would be retired and replaced by a weapon configured for 7.62×51mm NATO cartridges.

In 2019, India and Russia signed an Inter-Governmental Agreement (IGA). On 3 March the same year, the Prime Minister of India Narendra Modi inaugurated Indo-Russia Rifles in Korwa, Uttar Pradesh. The Joint Venture (JV), tasked for the production of AK-200 rifle family, included partnership among India's Ordnance Factory Board and Russia's Rosoboronexport and Kalashnikov Concern under the parentship of Rostec. By then, the production of 750,000 rifles was approved.

== Products ==
=== AK-203 ===
The IRRPL has been licensed to produce 6,00,000 AK-203 assault rifles chambered for 7.62×39mm. The AK-203 is a modernized 200 series AK-103 variant and one of the modern derivatives of the Russian AK-Pattern series of assault rifles. The 200 series are technically based on the AK-100 family and the more expensive AK-12 rifle family. The AK-203 is reported as the latest version of the AK-47 assault rifle.

In 2018, an Inter-Governmental Agreement (IGA) was signed between Russia and India for the AK-203 project.

On March 3, 2019, Russia and India inaugurated Indo-Russia Rifles in Uttar Pradesh. However, pricing disagreements, and international sanctions on Russia have caused delays in delivery and production.

During the Defence Expo 2020 in Lucknow, Major General Sengar announced that the IRRPL facility in Amethi would produce 75,000 AK-203 annually for 10 years.

On 6 December 2021, a deal was signed between Russia and India at a cost of ₹5,124 crore (equivalent to ₹57 billion or US$600 million in 2023) for the production of 601,247 AK-203 at the Korwa Rifle Factory by Indo-Russia Rifles. While the first 70,000 would be manufactured through transfer of technology from Kalashnikov, the rest will be manufactured indigenously. The deliveries would be completed within 10 years.

Meanwhile, Russia delivered the first batch of the 70,000 rifles on 25 January 2022 of the same design to the Indian Air Force as part of an off-the-shelf contract signed in August 2021. As of then Korwa Rilfe Factory was being upgraded with a modern production line to execute the 6 lakh order and a small range for acceptance trials for the Indian Army.

Production of the AK-203 started on 17 January 2023.

In May 2024, first batch of 27,000 rifles were delivered while another batch of 8,000 would be delivered "soon". The level of indigenous content achieved is 25%. In July 2024, the expected 8,000 units were delivered.

IRRPL has plans to deliver 70,000 rifles (30% indigenous content) in 2025 followed by 1,00,000 units in 2026. In a recent press conference the CEO of IRRPL made stated that they would reach 100% indigenous content by the start 2026.

== Ownership ==
The factory is a joint venture between three companies. As of 2023, Advanced Weapons and Equipment India Limited owns the controlling stakes at 42.5% with Munitions India Limited at a 8%, Kalashnikov Concern at 42% and Rosoboronexport at 7.5%.

A serving Major General SK Sharma from the Indian Army leads the company as its CEO & MD.

=== Leaders ===
- Major General Sanjeev Sengar (2019–2023)
- Major General S. K. Sharma (Aug 2023 onwards)
