= Kurwa =

Kurwa may refer to:

- a Polish profane word meaning "whore"
- Kurwa railway station, Dumka district, India
- Kurwa, a 2015 music album by Schwesta Ewa
- a village in Araria district, Bihar, India
- a village in Siwan district, Bihar, India
- a village in Borno State, Nigeria

== See also ==
- Korwa (disambiguation)
- Curva, curved seating stands at sports stadiums
- Kurwai, a town in Madhya Pradesh, India
- Kurwar, a village in Uttar Pradesh, India
