= AK-203 =

Russian assault rifle

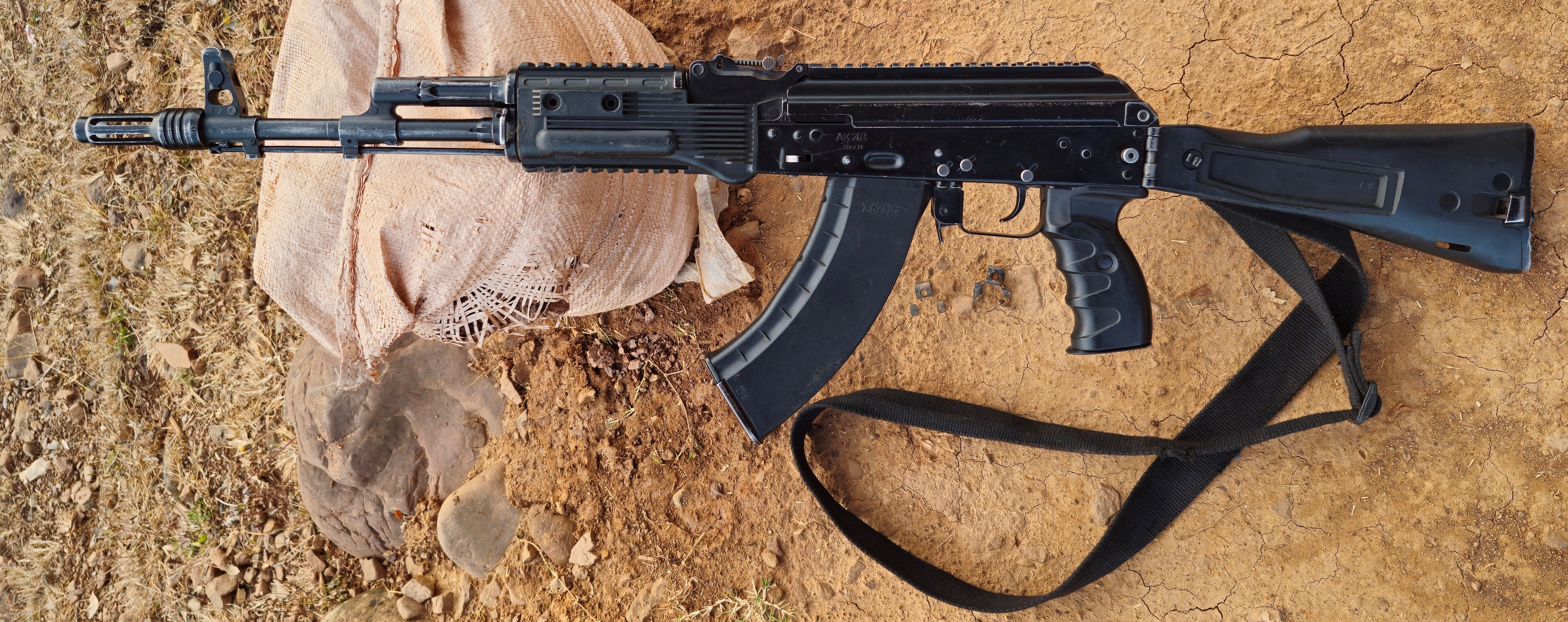
- AK–203 assault rifle.
- Type: Assault rifle
- Place of origin: Russia

Service history
- In service: 2022–present
- Used by: See Users

Production history
- Designer: Mikhail Kalashnikov
- Designed: 2007–2010
- Manufacturer: Kalashnikov Concern; Indo-Russia Rifles
- Produced: 2022-Present
- No. built: at least 53,000 (as of Sept. 2025) total 670,000 planned.

Specifications
- Mass: 3.8 kg (8.4 lb)
- Length: 880–940 mm (35–37 in) (stock extended)
- Barrel length: 415 mm (16.3 in)
- Cartridge: 7.62×39mm
- Caliber: 7.62mm
- Action: Gas-operated, rotating bolt
- Rate of fire: ~700 rounds/min
- Muzzle velocity: 715 m/s (2,346 ft/s)
- Effective firing range: 400–800 m (440–870 yd) (based on sight adjustments)
- Feed system: 30-round detachable box magazine 50-round detachable quad-column magazine
- Sights: Adjustable iron sights or picatinny rails for various optics

The AK-203 is a Russian gas-operated assault rifle designed to chamber the 7.62×39mm (also 7.62 Soviet) cartridge. It is one of the latest iterations of the AK series of assault rifles originally designed by Mikhail Kalashnikov. The AK-203 was developed in the 2010s by Kalashnikov Concern in Russia, primarily operated by the Indian Armed Forces.

== History ==
In 2019, India and Russia signed an Inter-Governmental Agreement (IGA). On 3 March the same year, the Prime Minister of India Narendra Modi inaugurated Indo-Russia Rifles in Korwa, Uttar Pradesh. The Joint Venture (JV), tasked for the production of AK-200 rifle family, included partnership among India's Ordnance Factory Board and Russia's Rosoboronexport and Kalashnikov Concern under the parentship of Rostec. By then, the production of 750,000 rifles was approved.

As of February 2020, the production, which was originally expected to commence in May that year, was delayed initially to the end of 2020 due to pricing disagreements. One of the objectives of the project was for India to have 100% indigenisation on the production of the rifles. However, this meant that initially, the domestically produced rifles would be 20–25% costlier than those imported from Russia. The production of rifles would begin only after the JV submits a "competitive" commercial bid. Later, due to the travel bans during COVID-19 pandemic, negotiations were further delayed and a fresh bid could not be submitted which meant the production would not begin in 2020.

As of August 2021, Indian Air Force reportedly purchased 70,000 AK-203 rifles from Russia. The deliveries would begin from within three months. The deal, worth around ₹300 crore (US$40.59 million), for the Indian Air Force as well as its Garud Commando Force under emergency procurement was signed by the Service in the third week of August 2021. The deliveries were to start within months.

In December 2021, India signed a ₹5,124 crore (US$693.2 million)-worth contract with Kalashnikov Concern for the procurement of 601,427 rifles from IRRPL. For the first batch of 70,000 rifles to be manufactured, the indigenous content would rise from 5% to 70%, while the remaining rifles would have 100% indigenous content. The full-scale production could be reached in 2–3 years.

== Design ==
The AK-203 is chambered for 7.62×39 and it uses AK-type magazines. It weighs 3.8 kg, and has a length of 690 mm with the stock folded, or 930 mm with it extended.

Its rate of fire is 700 rounds per minute. Its polymer front housing free floating case has been accused of being difficult to handle according to combat footage from the Russo-Ukraine war. It has a birdcage-type muzzle brake device for recoil control and muzzle flash reduction.

An individual AK-203 has 50 components and 180 sub-components and is built to fire at least 15,000 rounds in its life.

== Adoption ==
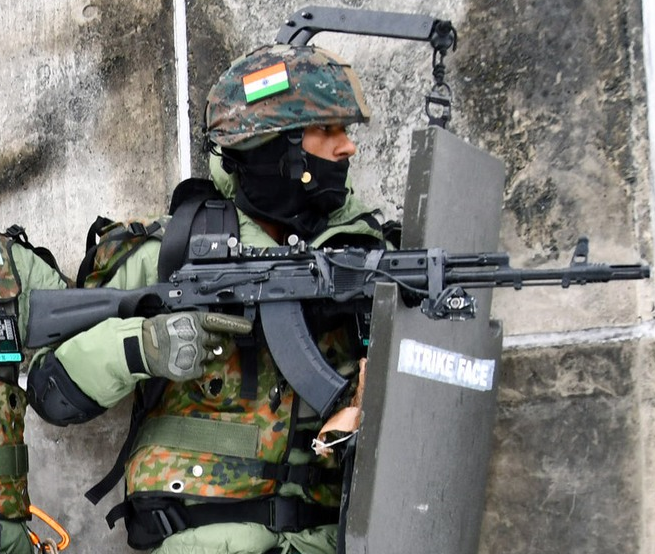
Indian soldier with AK and shield

The AK-203, nicknamed Sher, is the fourth generation of standard-issue rifle of the Infantry of the Indian Army following — Lee–Enfield .303 bolt action rifle (in service 1947–mid-1960s), (Note: Retired immediately after Sino-Indian War.) L1A1 Self-Loading 7.62 NATO semi-automatic rifle (in service 1961–1998) (Note: Adopted and license manufactured by Ordnance Factory Board post Sino-Indo War and retired with the induction of AK-47 derivatives and INSAS.) and INSAS 5.56 assault rifle (in service since 1994 and being replaced). While the L1A1 was outdated by the 1980s but the INSAS was still under development, multiple derivatives of AK-47 were adopted, starting with around 12,000 Soviet-origin AK-47 (produced by the Izhmash) captured from insurgents, followed by purchasing the Czech-origin Vz. 58, Bulgarian-origin AR-M1 from Arsenal AD.

The AK-203 is produced in India by Indo-Russia Rifles Private Limited (IRRPL) at an 8.5 acres (34,000 m^{2})-facility at Korwa Ordnance Factory in Amethi, Uttar Pradesh. The company has 50.5% Indian ownership and 49.5% Russian ownership.

=== 2022 ===
On 25 January 2022, Russia supplied the first batch of 70,000 AK-203 rifles to the Indian Air Force. Meanwhile, the rest of the 600,000 rifles that are to be produced by Indo-Russia Rifles in India under technology transfer will be used by the Indian Army. The IAF deal was signed in August 2021 with deliveries to start within months.

=== 2023–24 ===
The production of the rifles in India began in January 2023. On 3 February 2023, Alexander Mikheev, director general of Rosoboronexport, announced that the first batch of AK-203s were completed at Amethi. On 12 October 2023, it was reported that Kalashnikov Concern completed shipment of machinery and tools for India to manufacture AK-203s.

By mid 2024, Russia completed the transfer of 90,000 pages of technical documents in three phases. Thereafter, the Russian military standards was required to be converted to their Indian counterparts while the Indian industry absorbed 120 manufacturing processes and indigenised 1,600 Russian-origin precision gauges.

On 5 July 2024, Rostec announced that Indo-Russia Rifles Pvt. Ltd. (IRRPL) had delivered 35,000 rifles to the Indian Army. As of then, the rifles had an indigenous content of 25%. The deliveries were completed in batches of 27,000 rifles on 20 May and 8,000 rifles on 5 July.

=== 2025 ===
As of February, IRRPL expects to deliver 70,000 and 100,000 rifles to the Army in 2025 and 2026, respectively.

As of 17 July, 48,000 rifles were delivered to the Indian Army with an additional batch of 7,000 units to be delivered within the next 2–3 weeks. Meanwhile, the Indian produced rifles has achieved an indigenous content of 50% while the same of 70% and 100% is expected to be achieved by October and December, respectively.

The first batch of fully indigenised 15,000 rifles are to be delivered in December. Following the complete indigenisation, the rifle will be rebranded as Sher and production rate will rise to 12,000 units monthly which equates to a unit every 100 seconds or about 150,000 units annually. The deliveries are expected to be executed by December 2030 ahead of the contract schedule of October 2032. By now, the Indian Army has started phasing out the standard issue INSAS rifles.

Further, the Indian manufacturing facility currently employs 260 personnel, including permanent Russian experts, which is planned to be expanded to 537 personnel, which would include 90% Indians. The company also received 100% of technology and its testing has also been indigenised against the earlier practice of the parts to be approved from Russia.

So far, 60 critical components have been indigenised which are supplied by vendors pan-India and then assembled and tested in India. All the components have an alternate Indian supplier already.

On 9 September, 5,000 units were delivered to the Indian Army following trials under the supervision of a team representing the Director General of Quality Assurance (DGQA) in August. However, the December target for 100% indigenisation was missed and the project was delayed.

=== 2026 ===
In late August 2026, the first 100% indigenous Sher rifle completed its maiden trials including burst firing trials in the Korwa facility. The CEO of IRRPL confirmed that the prototype has undergone 3,000 successful test firings. Now, 10 such prototypes will be produced and delivered to the Army in September for user trials, DGQA evaluations, Military Infantry Trials (MIT), and environmental tests in summer and high-altitude conditions. The deliveries of the completely indigenous rifles will commence from April 2027. Meanwhile, the procedures for full-fledged production of fully indigenous rifles will be commenced which includes acquiring components from vendors and assembling them. So far, 55,000 assembled rifles have been delivered with components supplied under technology transfer stages while another batch of 7,500 rifles are ready for dispatch at the factory. These are part of the first phase of 70,000 rifles whose indigenous content varies from 5% to 70%. The firm plans to introduce a double-shift workflow policy from early 2027 in order to meet to the targets for higher production rate and completing the deliveries ahead of schedule.

On 5 September 2026, Adani Defence signed an five-year agreement with the Indian Army to supply 7.62×39mm ammunition for the AK-203 rifle programme.

=== Export ===
In an interview with Maria Vorobieva, Director of Kalashnikov Concern's Public Relations Department in October 2021, she said that some Asian nations, including those from the Commonwealth of Independent States (CIS), are interested in acquiring the AK-203.

On September 25, 2024, it was revealed that following the sanctions imposed on Russia, several Middle Eastern and African countries were reported to have enquired with IRRPL regarding export of the rifle.

In April 2025, it was reported that the Kerala Police are looking at procuring the AK-203 with proposals to export it to Nepal.

== Users ==
- India
  - Indian Army: Total 55,000 delivered as of August 2026 with 601,427 units on order.

== See also ==
- AK-100 (rifle family)
