= Korwa, Uttar Pradesh =

Korwa
- census town
- Location in Uttar Pradesh, India Korwa (India)
- Coordinates: 26°13′N 81°49′E
- Country: India
- State: Uttar Pradesh
- District: Amethi

Population (2011)
  - Total: 6,524

Language
  - Official: Hindi
  - Additional official: Urdu
  - Regional: Awadhi
- Time zone: UTC+5:30 (IST)
- Vehicle registration: UP
- Website: up.gov.in

Korwa is a census town in Amethi district in the Indian state of Uttar Pradesh. It is home to HAL's Avionics Division that has produced DARIN upgrade for the SEPECAT Jaguar and supplied similar electronic systems for MiG-27 aircraft. Ordnance Factory Project Korwa of the Ordnance Factories Board which manufactures products for the Indian Armed Forces is also located here.

== Demographics ==
As of the 2001 Census of India, Korwa had a population of 6,045. Males constitute 52% of the population and females 48%. Korwa has an average literacy rate of 81%, higher than the national average of 59.5%: male literacy is 86%, and female literacy is 76%. In Korwa, 10% of the population is under 6 years of age.

== Education ==
Korwa region consist of DAV HAL Public School Korwa Amethi affiliated to Central Board of Secondary Education.

== See also ==
- Indo-Russia Rifles Private Limited
