= Legionnaire E33k UAV =

The Legionnaire E33k is an unmanned aerial vehicle (UAV) currently in testing with the Russian ground forces. It is made by Tikhiye Krylya (Quiet Wings) Group, a subsidiary of Russian joint-stock arms manufacturing company Kalashnikov Concern.

== Operational history ==
The drone was successfully tested on July 17th 2024. The drone will be used to transport supplies according to reports.

== Specifications ==
The Legionnaire E33k weighs 29.9 kilograms and has a wingspan of four meters. It has a range of 200 kilometers with a payload of three kilograms and 50 kilometers with a payload of 10 kilograms. It can fly for up to 150 minutes (two and a half hours).
