= AK-104 =

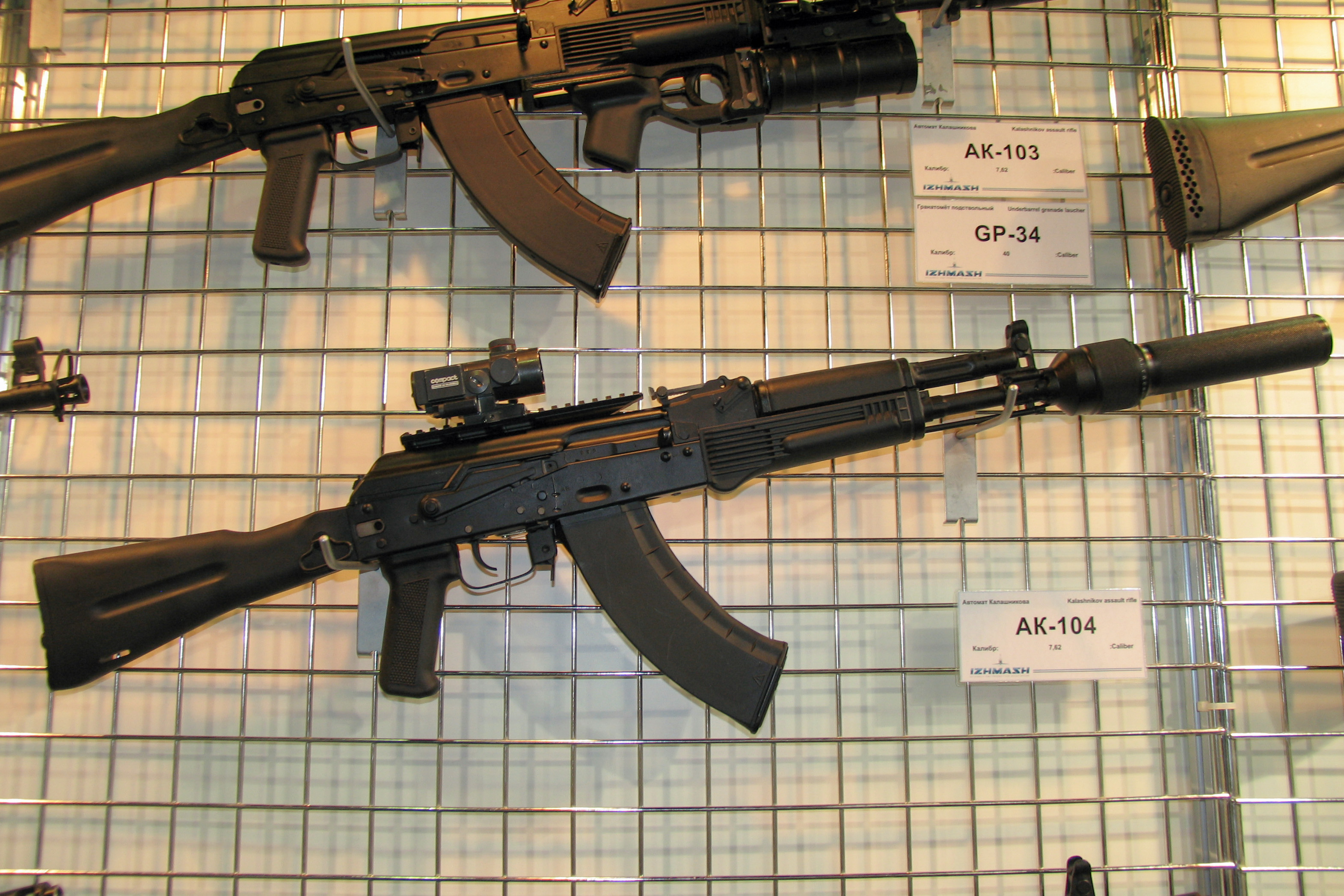
- The AK-104 carbine, seen with red dot sight on the picatinny rail and ATG suppressor attached to the barrel.
- Type: Assault rifle, carbine
- Place of origin: Russia

Service history
- In service: 2001–present
- Used by: See Users
- Wars: Syrian Civil War

Production history
- Designer: Mikhail Kalashnikov
- Designed: 1994
- Manufacturer: Kalashnikov Concern
- Produced: 1994
- Variants: See Variants

Specifications
- Mass: 3.0 kg (6.6 lb) empty 3.2 kg (7.1 lb) with empty magazine 3.7 kg (8.2 lb) with loaded magazine
- Length: 824 mm (32.4 in) with stock extended / 586 mm (23.1 in) with stock folded
- Barrel length: 314 mm (12.4 in)
- Cartridge: 7.62×39mm
- Action: Gas-actuated, rotating bolt
- Rate of fire: 600 rounds/min
- Muzzle velocity: 670 m/s (2,200 ft/s)
- Effective firing range: 300 m (330 yd) at point-blank range 500 m (550 yd)
- Feed system: 30 round detachable magazine
- Sights: Iron sights, there is a dove-tail side rail for optical and night sights

The AK-104 is a carbine variant of the AK-103 chambered in 7.62×39mm which feeds from any standard 7.62x39 AK pattern magazine.

== Design ==
The AK-104 is a 314mm (12.4 in) barreled carbine in the AK-100 series of rifles, the dimensions of the gun is the same to other carbines of the AK-100 series.

However, the AK-104 also features a solid, side-folding polymer stock, unlike the shorter, skeleton-stocked AKS-74U.

The AK-104 uses an adjustable notched rear tangent iron sight calibrated in 100 m (109 yd) increments from 100 to 500 m (109 to 547 yd). The front sight is a post adjustable for elevation in the field. Horizontal adjustment is done by the armory before issue.

The AK-104 has a muzzle booster derived from the AKS-74U.

Protective coatings ensure excellent corrosion resistance of metal parts. Forearm, magazine, butt stock and pistol grip are made of high strength plastic.

== Variants ==
=== AK-105 ===
The AK-105 is a shortened carbine version of the AK-74M rifle with identical barrel lengths.

=== SLR-107CR ===
A civilian semi-automatic rifle utilizing a gas block almost identical to the one seen on the Russian original. However the CR is distinctive in having a 16” extended barrel to comply with U.S. regulations, typically shrouded by a false extend booster or simply exposed with a simple nut threaded on at the gas block. Produced in Bulgaria and imported by Arsenal Inc.

=== PSAK-104 ===
A civilian semi-automatic series of firearms meant to duplicate the aesthetic of the AK-104. Examples in the series utilize a clone more similar to that of the Russian AK-104 gas block/front sight pattern as opposed to the Bulgarian SLR-107CR variant. Based on PSAK-103, however, it is distinct from other examples by utilizing the earlier AKM pattern bolt as well as other AKM pattern parts. Produced by Palmetto State Armory of South Carolina.

=== KR-104 ===
A short-barreled rifle version of the AK-104 by Kalashnikov-USA.

=== Small production examples ===
Due to the scarcity of AK-104 examples in the U.S. consumer market, a variety of small gunsmithing businesses and private individuals have obtained demilled AK-104 parts kits from overseas as well as a variety of U.S. made 922R compliant parts in order to build semi-automatic clones.

In addition, a very small number of Saiga rifles built on the AK-104 assembly line in Izhevsk, Russia appear to have been imported and converted to the more customary AK-104 configuration.

== Users ==
- Russia: Used by the Russian Federal Protective Service.
- Syria: A batch of AK-104's have reportedly been delivered to Syria's Interior Ministry Anti-Terrorism Syrian Special Mission Forces in the Eastern Ghouta front in Rif Dimashq.
- Thailand: Directorate of Logistics procured from Russian Federation.
- Venezuela: Produced under license by CAVIM alongside the AK-103.
- Yemen: In service with some units of the Yemeni Army.
