= CZ-G2000 =

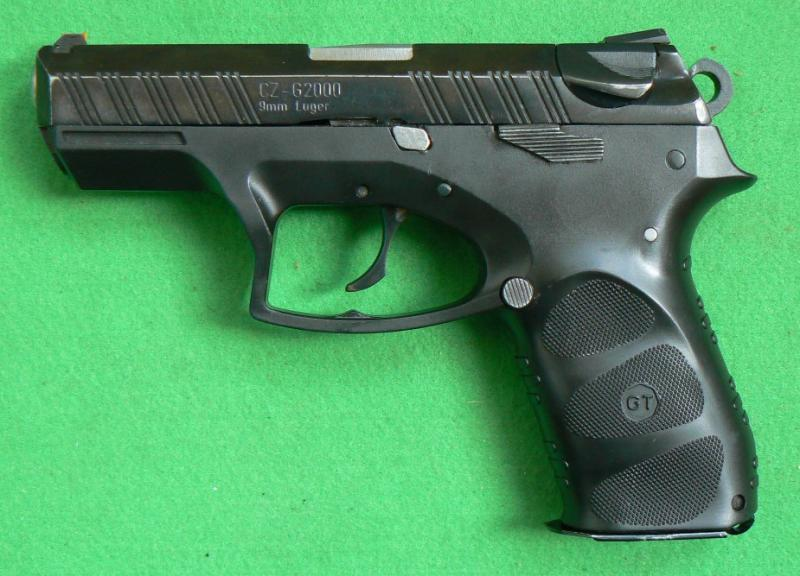
- Type: Semi-automatic pistol
- Place of origin: Czech Republic

Production history
- Designer: CZ-Guns Trade
- Manufacturer: Arms Moravia
- Produced: 1999

Specifications
- Mass: 780 g
- Length: 185 mm
- Barrel length: 102 mm
- Cartridge: 9×19mm Parabellum.40 S&W
- Action: short recoil, tilting barrel
- Rate of fire: semi-automatic
- Muzzle velocity: 350 m/s
- Effective firing range: 50 m
- Feed system: 15/19 rounds (9mm); 12/15 (.40 S&W)
- Sights: Fixed sights

The CZ-G2000 is a handgun created by CZ-Guns Trade and exported by Arms Moravia. It can be chambered for 9×19mm Luger and .40 S&W with different magazine capacities. In Germany, it's known as the CUG-2000.

== History ==
The pistol first made its public appearance in 1999 by Arms Moravia for Czech police trials. The CZ-G2000 made its debut at the IDEX-99 international military exhibit to show off to interested customers. It was only sold in the European commercial market from 1999 to 2005 before it made its disappearance with no further details.

== Design ==
The construction of the CZ-G2000's body is from polymer. The pistol has undergone torture tests to withstand dirty and wet conditions without lubrication and increased temperatures and in temperatures below -40 °C.

=== Features ===
The CZ-G2000 operations based on the Browning design, operating on automatic lock recoil and a tilting barrel. Its hammer can either be used in single or double action. The trigger has a push power of 2.4 kg in single action and 4.9 kg in double action.

=== Safety ===
The pistol has a decocker, being the only safety device available. In addition, an automatic safety lock is also mounted on the firing pin. This blocks the hammer to prevent it from firing, being available only when the trigger is properly pushed.

== Users ==
- Venezuela: Licensed under CAVIM as the Zamorana in 2005 and unveiled in 2006, created with some assistance from Czech engineers. It only has a capacity of 15 rounds in the 9×19mm caliber. It's to be adopted by local, municipal, state and national police forces.
