= Lebedev pistol =

PLK/MPL/MPL-1
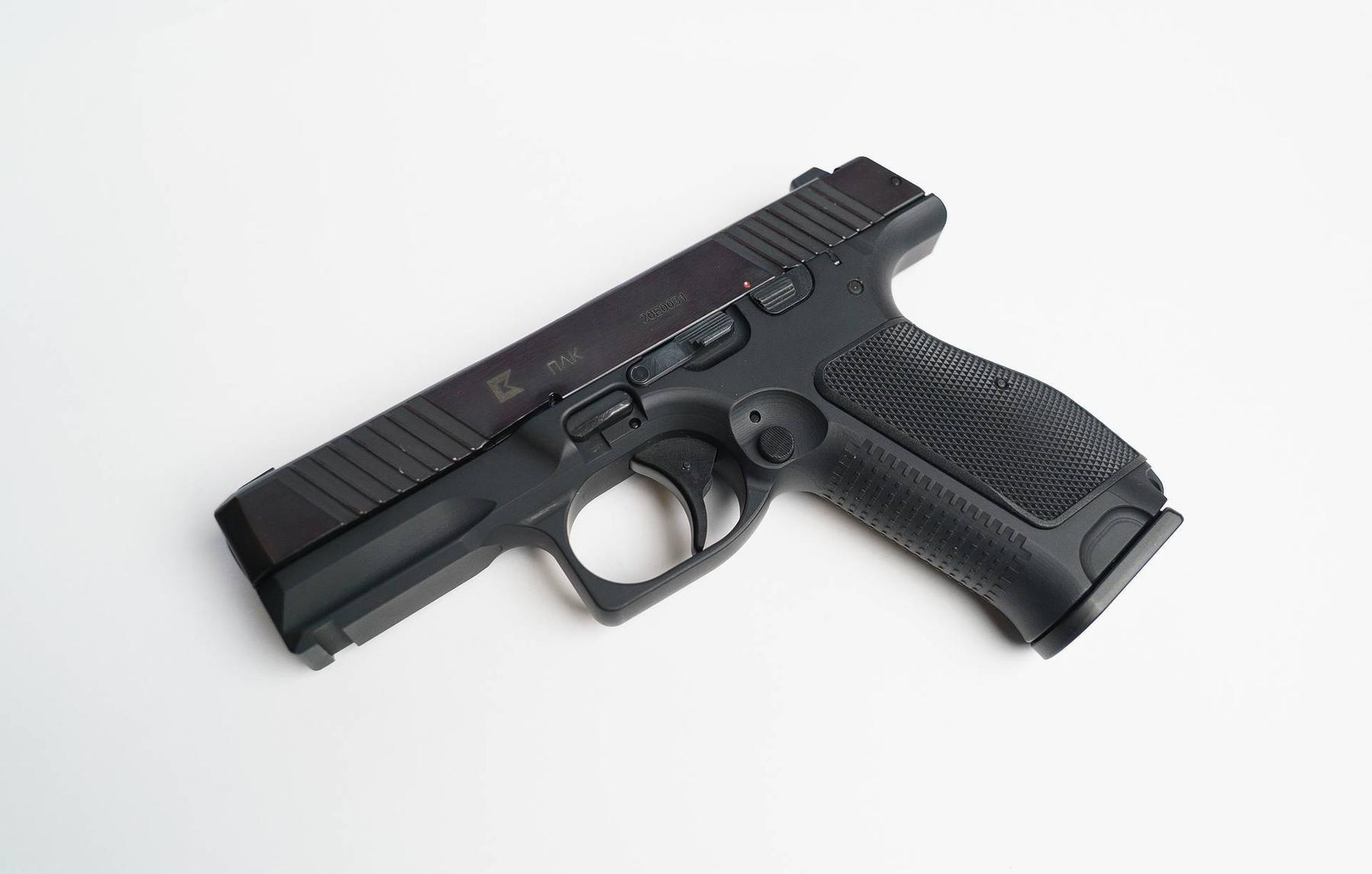
- Lebedev pistol compact (PLK)
- Type: Semi-automatic pistol
- Place of origin: Russia

Production history
- Designer: Dmitry Lebedev
- Designed: 2014
- Manufacturer: Kalashnikov Concern
- Produced: 2022
- No. built: 10,000 (2023)
- Variants: MPL, MPL-1, PLK

Specifications
- Mass: MPL: 800 g (28.2 oz); PLK: 710 g (25.0 oz) (without magazine)
- Length: MPL: 205 mm (8.1 in); PLK: 185 mm (7.3 in)
- Barrel length: MPL: 112 mm (4.4 in); PLK: 92 mm (3.6 in)
- Width: 36 mm (1.4 in)
- Height: MPL: 136 mm (5.4 in); PLK: 130 mm (5.1 in)
- Cartridge: 9×19 mm Parabellum; 9×19mm 7N21 +P+
- Caliber: 9mm
- Action: Recoil-operated
- Feed system: MPL: 16-rounds PLK: 14 rounds box magazine

The PL-15 (Russian: ПЛ-15), commonly known as the Lebedev pistol (Russian: Пистолет Лебедева, romanized: Pistolet Lebedeva), is a semi-automatic pistol produced by Russian company Kalashnikov Concern. It was designed for use by law enforcement in Russia with a focus on ergonomics, and was introduced into service with the Ministry of Internal Affairs in 2021.

== History ==
The PL-15 was developed by a team at Kalashnikov Concern led by Dmitry Lebedev (for whom the pistol is unofficially named) intended for use by the Russian Armed Forces and law enforcement agencies as a replacement for the aging Makarov pistol, as well as a sporting pistol for competitions of various classes. It was developed with input from sport shooters and Federal Security Service instructors. It was first introduced in 2015 as the PL-14 and presented at the Army-2015 International Military-Technical Forum near Moscow. A modernized version was demonstrated a year later at the Army-2016 forum and redesignated to the PL-15 in 2016. A compact version, the PL-15K, introduced in 2017. The modified PL-15 and its shortened version with the PL-15K index were demonstrated at the similar Army-2017 forum.

== Features ==
The PL-15 is a 9mm short recoil-operated, locked-breech handgun that uses a modified Browning-style cam-lock system similar to the one from the Browning Hi-Power pistol. The firearm's locking mechanism uses a linkless, vertically tilting barrel with a rectangular breech that locks into the ejection port cut-out in the slide.

It features a double-action-only trigger, requiring a long and heavy trigger pull that puts the striker into a cocked state and then releases it with every shot. The trigger pull weight is 4 kg, and the full length of the trigger pull is 7 mm.

It has a manual safety that, when engaged, disconnects the trigger from the striker. All controls (manual safeties, slide release levers and magazine release buttons) are fully ambidextrous. A loaded chamber indicator is provided in the form of a pin that protrudes from the back of the slide when a round is present in the chamber.

Cartridges are fed from proprietary detachable double-stack, single-feed magazines. It features removable front and rear dovetail sight posts, completely interchangeable with sights designed for Glock pistols. The frame features a picatinny rail underneath the barrel for the attachment of accessories. The PL-15 pistol can be equipped with an extended, threaded barrel, intended for installing a suppressor.

== Adoption ==
In August 2020, it was reported that the state tests for the PL-15 were complete for the Ministry of Internal Affairs, which is responsible for most law enforcement in Russia, and the general director of the Kalashnikov Concern, Dmitry Tarasov, said that the plant was being preparing for the production of the PL-15K compact version from 2021.

In March 2021, it was reported that the state tests of the MPL, a version of the PL-15 for the National Guard of Russia, were completed the past month and that Kalashnikov Concern were preparing for mass production from 2021.

The Ministry of Internal Affairs adopted a new compact version of the PL-15 pistol in October 2021 which Kalashnikov stated is ready to launch into mass production.

Pilot operation of the MPL and MPL1 (a special forces variant) by the National Guard was successfully completed on 26 July 2023. MPL and MPL1 pistols entered service with the Ministry of Internal Affairs in late 2023. MPL and MPL1 pistols passed qualification trials and adopted by the National Guard in April 2024.

== Variants ==
=== PL-14 ===
Original design.

=== PL-15 ===
Improved variant of the PL-14.

=== PL-15K ===
PLK pistol at ISF 2026

Compact variant of the PL-15.

=== PL-15-01 series ===
The PL-15-01 and PL-15K-01 variants of the pistol are striker-fired and have a single-action trigger with a significantly reduced trigger pull weight and length.

MPL pistol at ISF 2026

=== MPL ===
Variant for the National Guard of Russia.

=== MPL1 ===
Variant of the MPL for use by special forces.

=== SP1 ===
Sport shooting variant.

== Users ==
- Russia
  - Police of Russia
  - National Guard of Russia
  - Federal Security Service (FSB)
  - Russian Armed Forces

== See also ==
- MR-443 Grach (PYa)
- Glock
- HS 2000
- Udav
