= Zamorana Pistol =

Pistola Zamorana
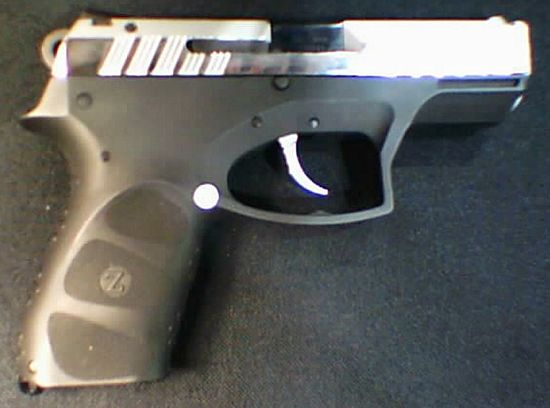
- Zamorana Pistol
- Type: Semi-automatic pistol
- Place of origin: Venezuela

Production history
- Manufacturer: CAVIM
- Developed from: CZ-G2000
- Developed into: MAC RX-7
- Unit cost: Bs975,000°° VEB (about $470°° USD) on February, 2006
- Produced: 2005-2011
- No. built: 3,276 (until 2008)

Specifications
- Mass: 755 g (1.66 lb)
- Length: 180 mm (7.09 in)
- Barrel length: 102 mm (4.02 in)
- Cartridge: 9×19mm Parabellum
- Caliber: 9 mm
- Action: Blowback/Double action
- Feed system: 15 rounds magazine
- Sights: fixed

The Zamorana is a Venezuelan semi-automatic pistol manufactured by the Compañía Anónima Venezolana de Industrias Militares (CAVIM), based on a Czech patent derived from the Moravia Arms CZ-G2000 pistol. The weapon is named "Zamorana" in honor of Ezequiel Zamora, a peasant leader of the Venezuelan Federal War and a central figure in the personal philosophy of President Hugo Chávez.

== Design and development ==
It was announced in February 2006, presented as the first step to develop and produce weapons in Venezuela after 30 years. It is a standard short-recoil-operated semi-automatic pistol with tilting barrel; it is hammer-fired with external hammer. Barrel locks into slide with single large locking lug that enters ejection window; unlocking is controlled by the cam-shaped lug below the barrel which interacts with the cross-pin, set into frame. Pistol frame is made from impact-resistant polymer, with removable steel insert that hosts slide rails. Trigger is of double action type, with exposed hammer, automated firing pin block and slide-mounted decocker lever (left side only). Magazines are double stack, magazine release is located at the base of the enlarged trigger guard. Sights are fixed, both front and rear being dovetailed into the slide.

Production was halted in 2011 due to an investigation into the misappropriation of funds within CAVIM, a situation in which General Gustavo Ochoa Méndez, CEO of CAVIM between 2005 and 2008; Gustavo Ochoa Méndez, director of Česká pošta and Captain José Guerra Rodríguez, project manager, were involved.
