= AK-103 =

Russian assault rifle

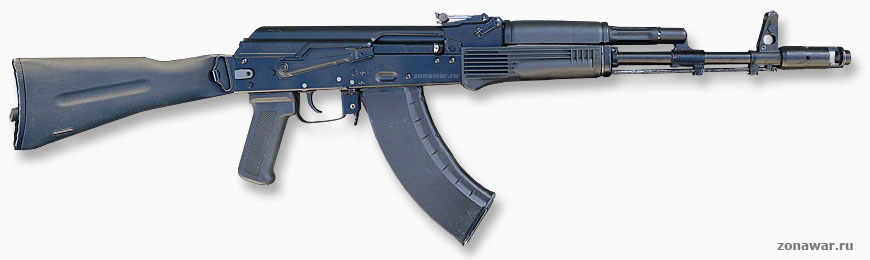
- Type: Assault rifle
- Place of origin: Russia

Service history
- In service: 2001–present
- Used by: See Users
- Wars: War in Afghanistan (2001–2021); Insurgency in the Maghreb (2002–present); Iraq War; Libyan Civil War; Syrian Civil War; War in Iraq (2013–2017); Yemeni Civil War (2014–present); Saudi Arabian-led intervention in Yemen; Saudi–Yemeni border conflict (2015–present); Tigray War; Russian invasion of Ukraine; War in Amhara; Gaza war

Production history
- Designer: Mikhail Kalashnikov
- Designed: 1993
- Manufacturer: Kalashnikov Concern
- Unit cost: Gov. price US$150–160 per unit in 2014
- Produced: 1994–present
- No. built: 250,000+
- Variants: AK-104

Specifications
- Mass: 3.6 kg (7.9 lb) empty 4.1 kg (8.2 lb) with loaded magazine
- Length: 943 mm (37.1 in) stock extended / 705 mm (27.8 in) stock folded
- Barrel length: 415 mm (16.3 in)
- Cartridge: 7.62×39mm
- Caliber: 7.62mm
- Action: Gas operated, rotating bolt
- Rate of fire: 600 rounds/min
- Muzzle velocity: 715 m/s (2,346 ft/s)
- Effective firing range: 350 m (380 yd) at point-blank range 500 m (550 yd)
- Feed system: 30-round detachable box magazine
- Sights: Iron sights, with a dove tail side rail for mounting optical and night sights

The AK-103 is an assault rifle designed by Russian small arms designer Mikhail Kalashnikov. It is chambered in 7.62x39 and belongs to the export AK-100 (rifle family).

== History ==
The AK-103 was officially offered for export on March 13, 1993. The manufacturer said in October 2026 that AK-103 was its most widely exported small arms product over the past five years.

== Design details ==
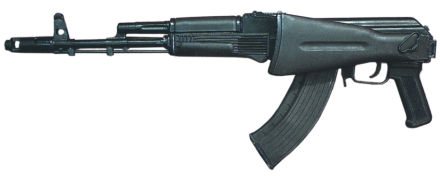
AK-103 with the stock folded.

It is an AK-100 derivative of the AK-74M that is chambered for the 7.62x39mm M43 cartridge, similar to the AKM.

The AK-103 can be fitted with a variety of sights, including night vision and telescopic sights, plus a knife-bayonet or a grenade launcher like the GP-34. Newer versions can fit Picatinny rails, allowing more accessories to be mounted.

The AK-103 uses plastic components where possible instead of wood or metal, with such components being the pistol grip, handguards, folding stock and depending on the type, the magazine.

Protective coatings for corrosion resistance of metal parts. Forearm, magazine, butt stock and pistol grip are made of high strength shatterproof plastic.

The AK-104 is a compact version of the AK-103 chambered for 7.62×39mm ammunition. It has a muzzle brake derived from the older AKS-74U combined with a shorter barrel.

=== Magazines ===
The current issue steel-reinforced matte true black nonreflective surface finished 7.62×39mm 30-round magazines, fabricated from ABS plastic weigh 0.25 kg (0.55 lb) empty. Early steel AK-47 magazines are 9.75 in (248 mm) long, and the later ribbed steel AKM and newer plastic 7.62×39mm magazines are about 1 in (25 mm) shorter.

The transition from steel to mainly plastic magazines yielded a significant weight reduction and allow a soldier to carry more rounds for the same weight.

| Rifle | Cartridge | Cartridge weight | Weight of empty magazine | Weight of loaded magazine | Max. 10.12 kg (22.3 lb) ammunition load* |
|---|---|---|---|---|---|
| AK-47 (1949) | 7.62×39mm | 16.3 g (252 gr) | Slab-sided steel 430 g (0.95 lb) | 30-rounds 916 g (2.019 lb) | 11 magazines for 330 rounds 10.08 kg (22.2 lb) |
| AKM (1959) | 7.62×39mm | 16.3 g (252 gr) | Ribbed stamped-steel 330 g (0.73 lb) | 30-rounds 819 g (1.806 lb) | 12 magazines for 360 rounds 9.83 kg (21.7 lb) |
| AK-103/AK-104 (1993) | 7.62×39mm | 16.3 g (252 gr) | Steel-reinforced plastic 250 g (0.55 lb) | 30-rounds 739 g (1.629 lb) | 13 magazines for 390 rounds 9.61 kg (21.2 lb) |

Note: All, 7.62×39mm AK magazines are backwards compatible with older AK variants.
Note *: 10.12 kg (22.3 lb) is the maximum amount of ammo that the average soldier can comfortably carry. It also allows for best comparison of the three most common 7.62×39mm AK platform magazines.

== Variants ==
The semi-automatic only variant of the AK-103 is designated the AK-103-1, and the three round burst is designated the AK-103-2.

=== STL-1A ===
The STL-1A (or also called the STL-A1)

=== CS/LR11 ===
The CS/LR11 is a clone of the AK-103 made by China Jing An Import & Export Corporation (CJAIE).

==== SDM AK-103 ====
Chinese clone of the AK-103 marketed by Sino Defense Manufacturing.

=== KR-103 ===
The KR-103 is a semi-automatic clone of the AK-103 made by Kalashnikov USA.

=== PSA AK-103 ===
The PSA AK-103 is a semi-automatic partial clone of the AK-103 made by Palmetto State Armory. It shares many features of the AK-103, except that it uses an AKM style bolt and bolt carrier.

== Users ==
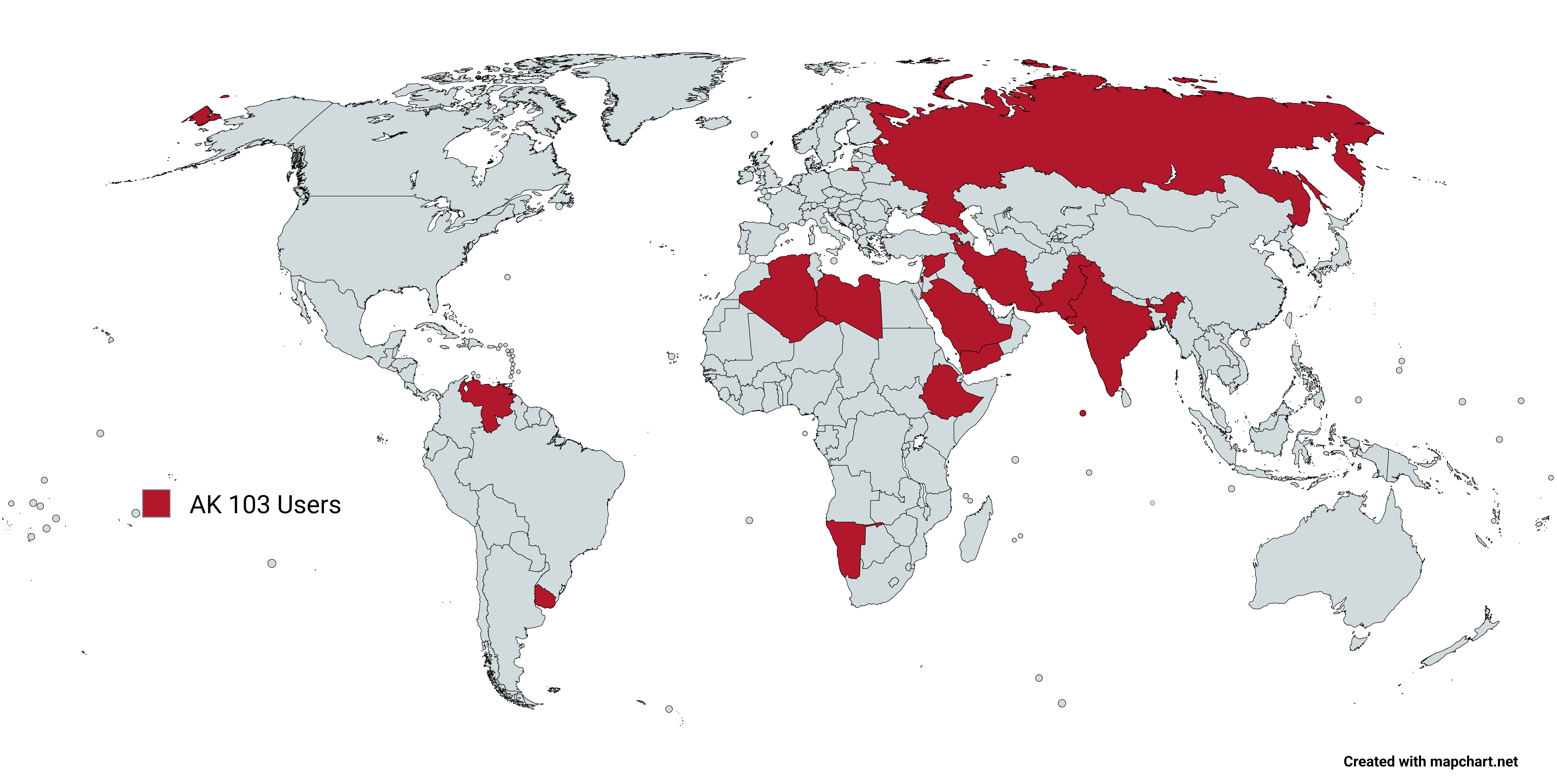
A map with AK-103 users in red

,

- Algeria: Used by the Parachute Commando Regiments
- Armenia: The licensed production of the AK-103 started in July 2020.
- Ethiopia: The Gafat Armament Engineering Complex produces the AK-103 rifle in Ethiopia. Supplements the AKM and AK-47 in the Ethiopian Armed Forces. It was reported in 2014 that the deal didn't go through at all.
- Iran: The sale of an undisclosed number of AK-103s for use by sections of the Iranian special forces and marines and use by Islamic Revolutionary Guard Corps special forces was reported. The IRGC is reported to be using the AK-103.
- India:
  - Indian Navy
    - MARCOS
  - Indian Air Force: An off-the-shelf emergency contract for 70,000 rifles was signed in August 2021 for direct procurement from Russia at a cost of ₹300 crore (US$40.59 million). The deliveries would begin in late 2022.
    - Garud Commando Force
- Used by the Indian Navy and 70,000 were ordered by the Indian Air Force.
- Libya: Seen in the hands of anti-Gaddafi forces and loyalists in numerous photos. The rifles in use are the AK-103-2 version.
- Maldives: Used by Maldives National Defence Force
- Namibia: Used by Namibian Marine Corps
- Pakistan: Unlicensed clone "PK-21" in production by Pakistan Ordnance Factories.
- Palestine: Used by the Izz ad-Din al-Qassam Brigades.
- Russia: Used by Spetsnaz GRU, SSO, selective VDV and Russian Naval Infantry units, Wagner Group, Alpha Group and Police / Spetsnaz units of the Ministry of Internal Affairs.
- Saudi Arabia: A license to produce AK-103 rifles was granted to Saudi Arabia in 2017.
- Syria: Captured from rebels. Used by the Syrian Arab Army.
- Venezuela: First 30,000 AK-103 rifles were received in June 2006. Made under license by CAVIM. CAVIM's AK-103 factories opened officially in 2012 without the necessary manufacturing equipment. CAVIM-made AK-103s were delivered to the Venezuelan Army in 2013. Due to trouble with the plant with the Russian contractor failing to meet deadlines with a case of fraud, which forced CAVIM to finish the rest of the construction with manufacturing to start by 2019, full-scale production of ammunition started in July 2025 with a capacity of 70 million rounds a year.
- Uruguay: 500 AK-103s for the Uruguayan National Guard.
- Yemen: AK-103s made in Yemen as reported in February 2022.

=== Non-state actors ===
- Fano (militia): AK-103s captured from the Ethiopian National Defense Force.
- Guardians of Religion Organization
- Hezbollah: AK-103s recovered by the IDF.
- MUJAO used an ex-Libyan AK-103-2 in Agadez and Arlit attacks in 2013.

== Gallery ==
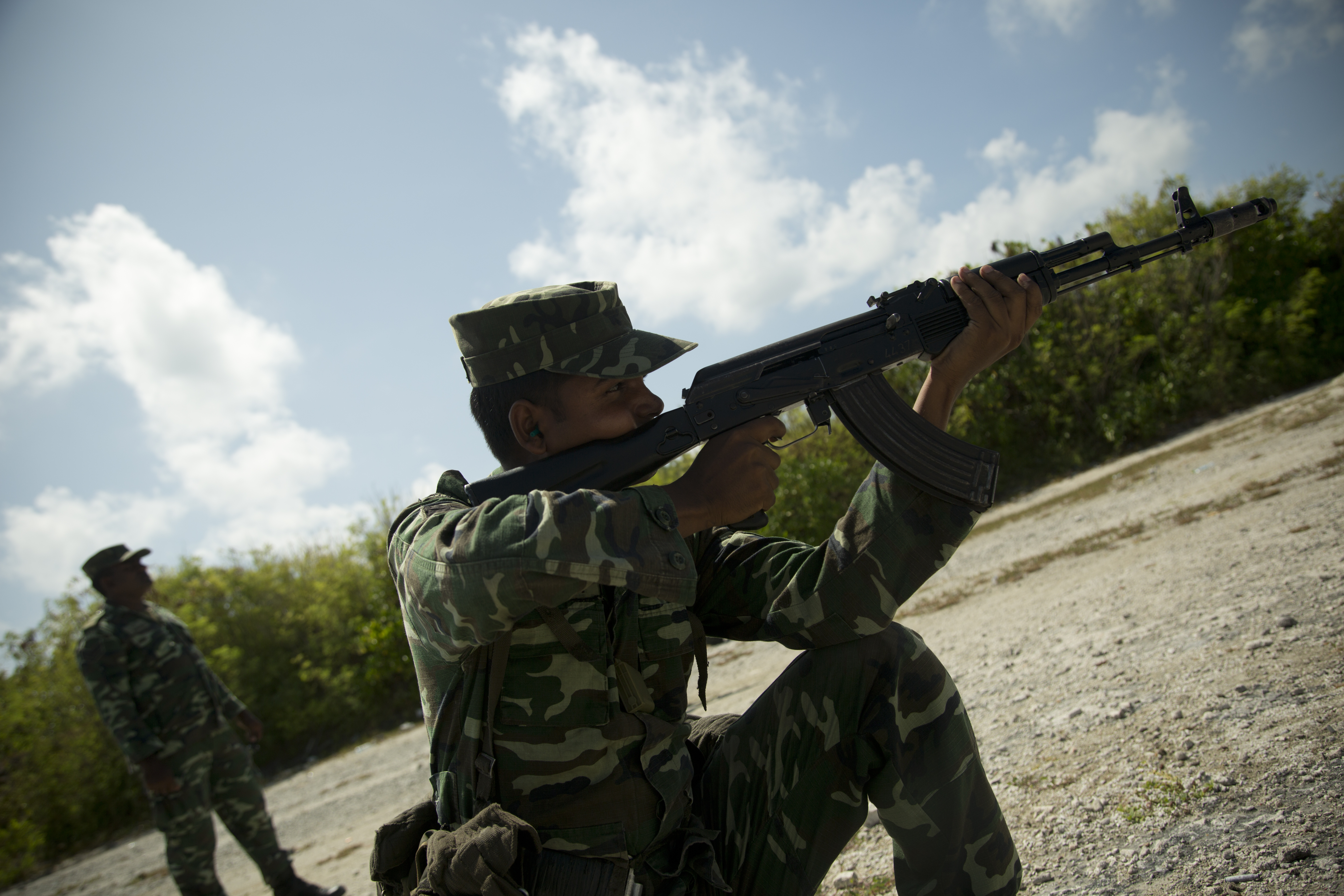
Maldives National Defense Force soldier with an AK-103

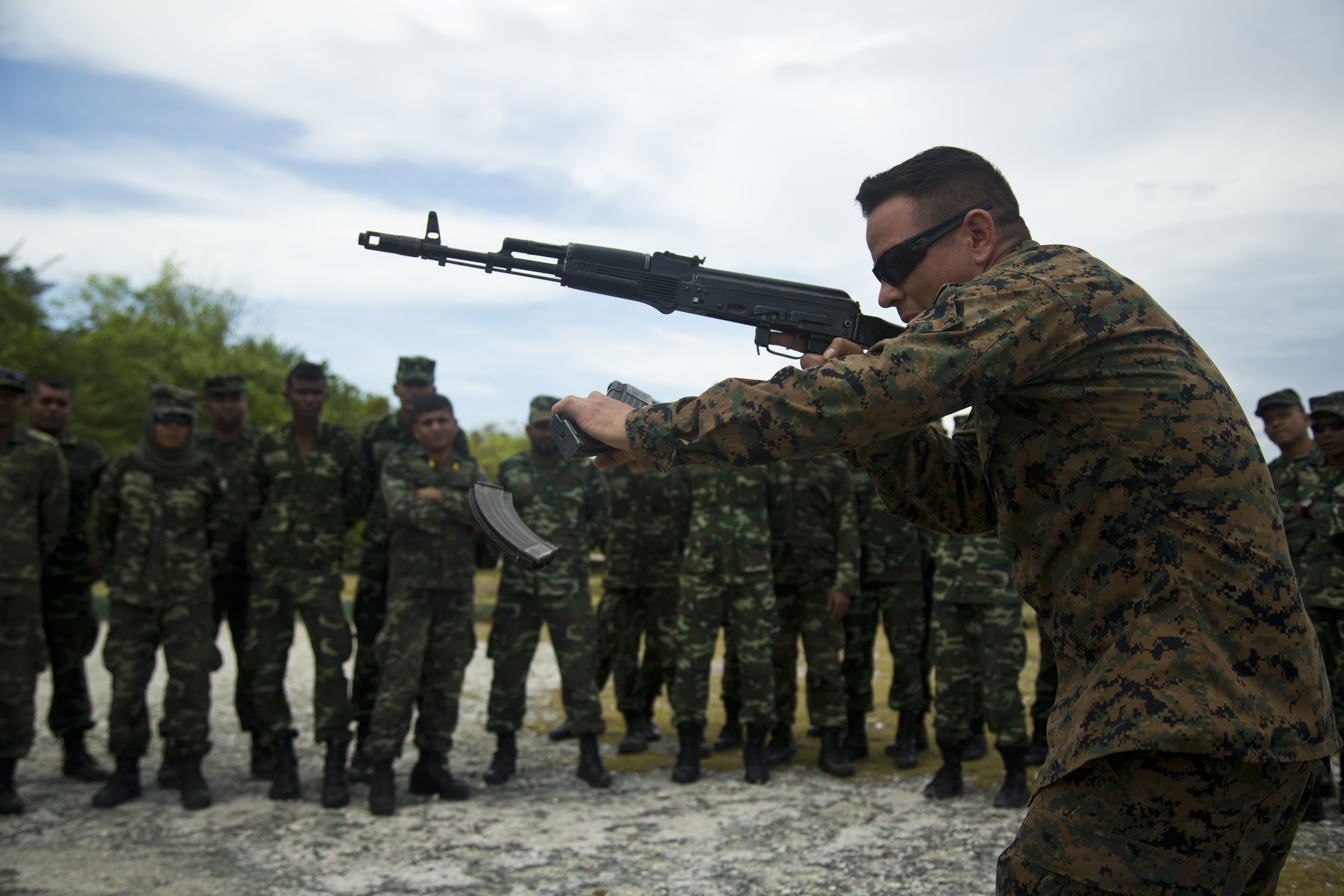
U.S. Marine teaching a reloading technique with the AK-103 to Maldives National Defense Force members
