= CAVIM Caribe =

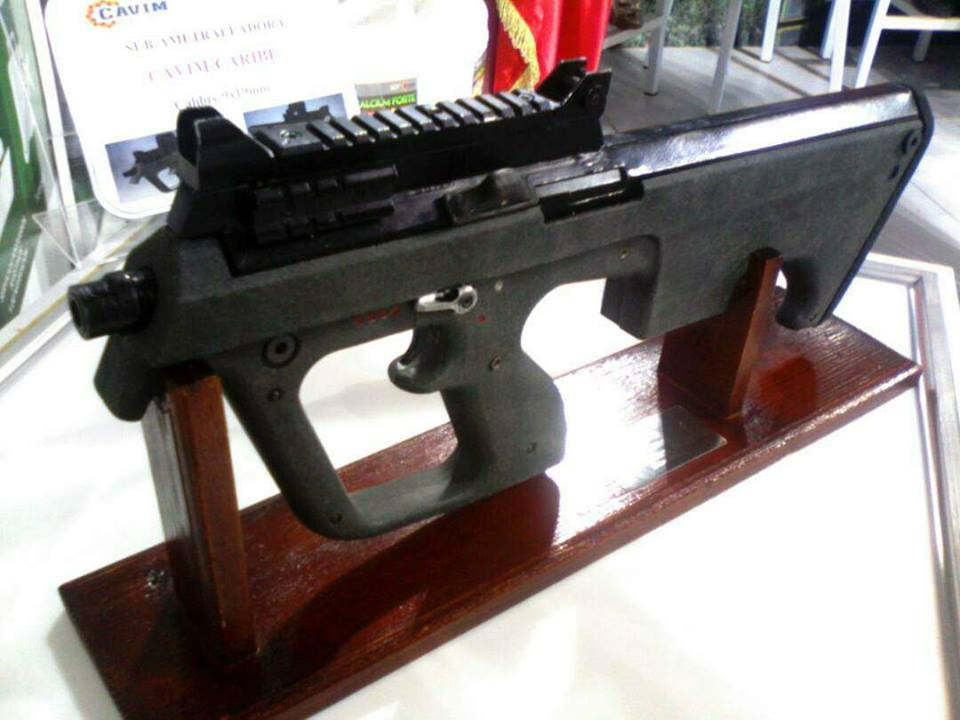
- Type: Submachine gun / Bullpup
- Place of origin: Venezuela

Production history
- Designed: 2006
- Manufacturer: CAVIM
- Produced: 2019-present

Specifications
- Mass: 3.8 kg (8.38 lb) full
- Length: 500 mm (20 in)
- Barrel length: 250 mm (9.8 in)
- Cartridge: 9×19mm Parabellum
- Caliber: 9 mm
- Action: Blowback
- Rate of fire: 1200 spm
- Feed system: 30 rounds magazine
- Sights: Adjustable
- References: according to CAVIM

The CAVIM Caribe is a bullpup submachine gun that uses the 9x19 mm Parabellum cartridge, designed and manufactured by Compañía Anónima Venezolana de Industrias Militares.

== Design and development ==
It has a bullpup design with a detachable straight magazine holding 30 rounds of 9×19mm Parabellum ammunition. It has an overall length of 50 cm, a 25 cm barrel, and weighs 3.8 kg with a full magazine and 3.42 kg with an empty magazine. It features a 3-position fire selector (safe, single shot, burst) on the left side above the trigger, an adjustable front sight and rear sight, as well as a Picatinny rail on top.

Its development began in 2006, initially under the name F-Caribe. It was presented to the public in June 2018, and its production was announced by dictator Nicolás Maduro in May 2019 with an investment of €6,833,385 for its production line. According to Admiral Carlos Molina Tamayo, former head of the Weapons Directorate of the Venezuelan Armed Forces, at the start of production, the weapon was manufactured almost entirely by hand, which led to quality problems and caused the weapon to deform during testing after 300 rounds.
