= Kalashnikov Concern SR1 =

Kalashnikov SR-1
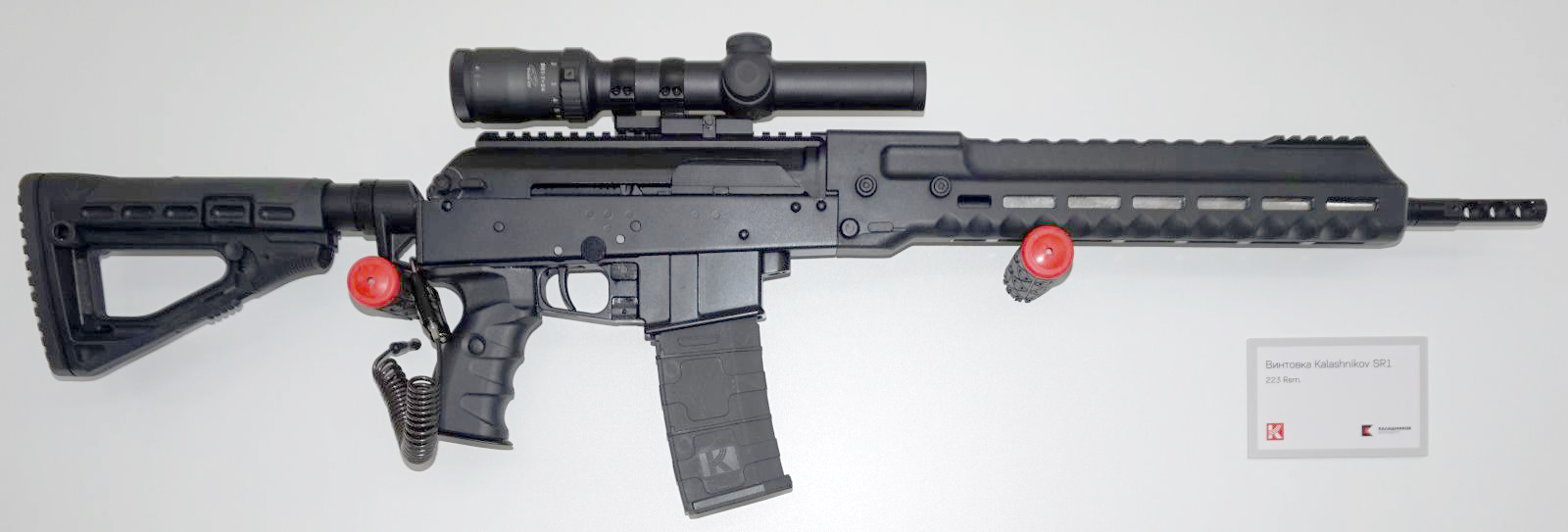
- Type: Semi-automatic rifle
- Place of origin: Russia

Production history
- Manufacturer: Kalashnikov Concern
- Produced: 2018–present

Specifications
- Mass: 4.2 kg (9.26 lb)
- Length: 940 mm (37 in)
- Barrel length: 415 mm (16.3 in)
- Cartridge: 5.56×45mm NATO
- Action: Gas-operated, rotating bolt, BARS system

The Kalashnikov SR-1 is a semi-automatic rifle designed and manufactured by the Kalashnikov Concern (formerly Izhmash). It is based on the AK-107 assault rifle.

== History ==
In 2012, Kalashnikov decided to develop a variant of the AK-107 for the civilian market. Earlier civilian offshoots of the Kalashnikov family of weapons were marketed under the Saiga brand, and so the project was initially named Saiga MK-107. This Saiga MK-107 was caliber 5.45×39mm. In 2018, serial production of the final version SR-1 in 5.56×45mm NATO caliber began, which went on sale in May of that year.

== Design and operation ==
The SR-1 is a gas-operated, rotary-bolt style rifle. It is basically based on the Kalashnikov bolt system with two locking lugs, but has two counter-rotating gas pistons, one on top of the other. The barrel is free-floating and is surrounded by the fore-end, which is only attached to the receiver.

Like the AK-107, the SR-1 is equipped with a counterweight that compensates for the receding bolt mass and thereby absorbs a large part of the recoil, which means that the weapon is better on target on the second shot. The system goes back to experimental weapons from the 1970s (AO-38, AL-4 and AL-7). The gas piston and bolt carrier on the one hand and the counterweight with the second gas piston on the other are equipped with longitudinal teeth similar to a rack and are connected to one another with two gears (AK-107/108: one gear). When the projectile leaves the barrel, the powder gases act on both gas pistons, that of the bolt carrier is pushed backwards and that of the counterweight forwards. The gears synchronize the movement of both parts.

The weapon is fully ambidextrous. For this purpose, it has a pin safety above the trigger guard and a cocking lever on the left and right side, which, as is usual with Kalashnikovs, are firmly connected to the bolt carrier. Both gas pistons have their own return spring. The SR-1 has a magazine well designed for AR-15 standard magazines and a slide catch. The magazine release button is located on the left side of the receiver.

An AR-15-typical, length-adjustable shoulder rest serves as the shoulder rest. The breech cover is designed to be stiffer than that of a Kalashnikov and carries the Picatinny rail. It is fixed at the end of the receiver with a bolt. This ensures that when the weapon is partially dismantled, the sighting device is not misaligned.

== See also ==
- List of Russian weaponry
