= Udav =

SR-2 Udav
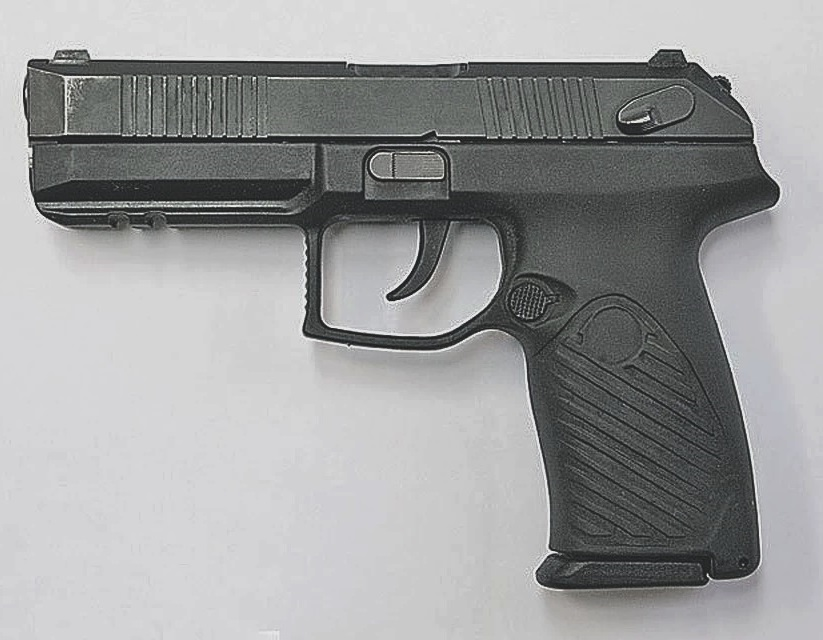
- Udav pistol
- Type: Semi-automatic pistol
- Place of origin: Russia

Service history
- In service: 2019-present

Production history
- Designer: Ivan Kozlov
- Manufacturer: TsNIITochMash

Specifications
- Mass: 780 g (28 oz) (without magazine)
- Length: 206 mm (8.1 in)
- Barrel length: 120 mm (4.7 in)
- Cartridge: 9×21mm Gyurza
- Action: Recoil-operated
- Feed system: 18-round box magazine

The SR-2 Udav pistol (Russian: Удав, means “Boa”) is a Russian 9×21mm semi-automatic pistol, developed by Central Scientific - Research Institute of Precision Machine Engineering (TsNIITochMash).

== Design ==
The Udav pistol is a short-recoil-operated, semi-automatic handgun. It uses a traditional Browning-type action with a tilting barrel that locks into the ejection opening in the slide.

The trigger is of double action type, with an exposed hammer and ambidextrous safety levers on the slide. When engaged, the safety also automatically lowers (decocks) the hammer. The pistol features a polymer frame with a steel insert molded into it. There is no manual slide release lever.

The slide hold-open device is automatically disengaged to chamber a fresh round as soon as a new, loaded magazine is inserted into the grip.

The gun fires 7N42 armor-piercing rounds and 7U4 cartridges with reduced bullet velocity. This pistol uses double-column, two position feed magazines holding 18 rounds. The magazine release button is ambidextrous and located at the base of the trigger guard.

For special operations, the Udav pistol can be equipped with an extended threaded barrel to accept a detachable sound suppressor (silencer). It also features a built-in rail under the barrel, forward of the trigger-guard for the easy attachment of lights or aiming devices.

== Variants ==
=== Poloz ===
9x19mm variant of the Udav. Intended for use of law enforcement. Its magazine can hold 15 rounds.

== Users ==
- Russia: The pistol successfully passed official trial in January 2019, getting approved for adoption by the Russian Army.

== See also ==
- MR-443 Grach (PYa)
- Lebedev pistol
