= SV-98 =

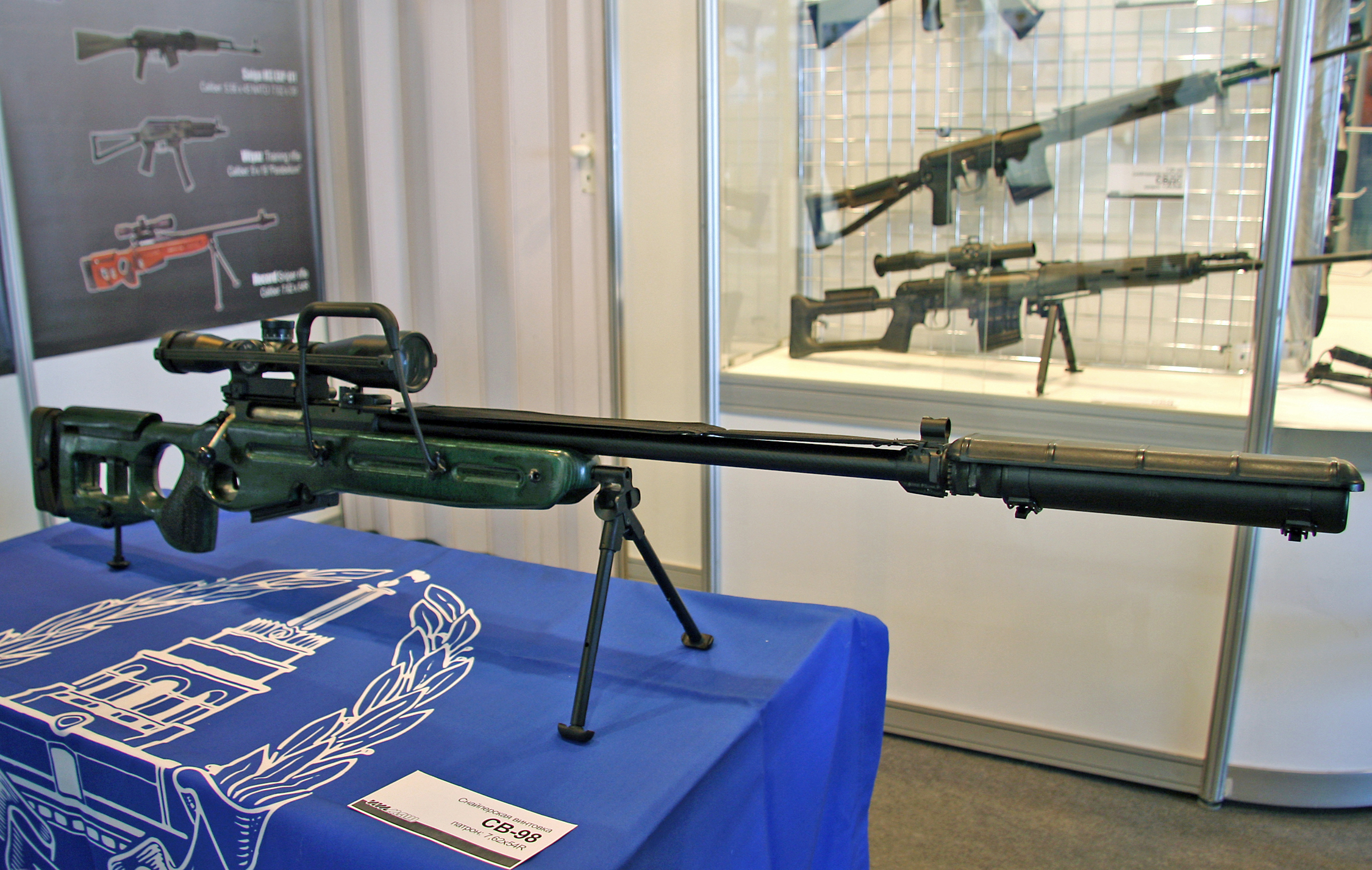
- SV-98 equipped with a 1P69 3-10×42 telescopic sight, carrying handle, bipod, anti-mirage strap and suppressor
- Type: Sniper rifle
- Place of origin: Russia

Service history
- In service: 2003–present
- Used by: See Users
- Wars: Guerrilla phase of the Second Chechen War; Russo-Georgian War; Syrian Civil War; 2022 Russian invasion of Ukraine

Production history
- Designer: Vladimir Stronskiy
- Designed: 1998
- Manufacturer: Izhmash/Kalashnikov Concern
- Produced: 1998–present
- Variants: 2013 upgraded version

Specifications
- Mass: 5.8 kg (12.8 lb) w/o optical sight and suppressor 7.8 kg (17.2 lb) with optical sight and suppressor
- Length: 1,200 mm (47.24 in); 1,375 mm (54.13 in) with suppressor
- Barrel length: 650 mm (25.59 in) (4 grooves, right-hand twist)
- Cartridge: 7.62×54mmR; 7.62×51mm NATO.338 Lapua Magnum
- Action: Bolt action
- Muzzle velocity: 820 m/s (2,690 ft/s)
- Effective firing range: 600 m (656 yd) iron sights 1,000 m (1,094 yd) optical sight
- Feed system: 10-round detachable magazine
- Sights: Telescopic sight and iron sights

The SV-98 (Snaiperskaya Vintovka Model 1998) is a Russian bolt-action sniper rifle designed by Vladimir Stronskiy. In 2003 special operations troops were armed with the 7.62 mm 6S11 sniper system comprising the SV-98 sniper rifle (index 6V10) and 7N14 sniper enhanced penetration round. The rifle has been used in combat during operations in Chechnya and Ukraine.

== Design details ==
The SV-98 sniper rifle is based on the Record 300 m (328 yd) full bore sport shooting rifle series also made by Izhmash. Izhmash also produces Record target rifles chambered in .308 Winchester, 7.62×54mmR and .338 Lapua Magnum which are similar to the SV-98.

According to the manufacturer, the SV-98 sniper rifle is designed to engage various targets at a range up to 1,000 m (1,100 yd).

The heart of the SV-98 is a cold-hammer forged receiver and a cold-hammer forged free-floating heavy barrel which can be chrome lined to order. The manually operated bolt action has a rotating bolt with three symmetrically spaced frontal lugs. The barrel has 4 grooves right-hand rifling and a 320 mm (1 in 12.6 in) twist rate and features a threaded muzzle which can accept the standard provided conical birdcage-pattern muzzle brake or a specially designed 23db (A) suppressor that requires the use of subsonic ammunition. The rifle was developed to fire 7.62×54mmR 7N1 standard sniper, 7N14 enhanced penetration sniper or "Extra" match grade sports cartridges.

The SV-98 is equipped with iron sights (shrouded front and an up to 600 m (656 yd) in 100 m (109 yd) increments adjustable tangent-type rear sight) and a Picatinny rail on top of the receiver that can be used to mount Russian and foreign made telescopic sights and other aiming optics with an appropriate rail interface system. According to several internet sources, a standard telescopic sight used on this rifle is the PKS-07 7× fixed-magnification scope. The manufacturer however states the Russian made 1P69 3-10×42 variable magnification telescopic sight with a sighting range of up to 1,000 m (1,094 yd) is used as standard day light optical sight. The 1PN113 3.7× fixed magnification night sight is used as the standard low light optical sight.

The ambidextrous laminated plywood stock features an adjustable butt plate that can be regulated for length of pull, height and pitch and has a height and length adjustable cheek comb. A fiber glass reinforced polymer stock was also offered. A front attachment point is situated at the foreend for mounting an integral folding bipod and the stock is prepared for mounting an integral rear monopod. The length of both bipod legs is independently adjustable and the rear monopod folds into the stock. A carrying handle can be attached to the stock in order to prevent the operator from grasping the rifle by its aiming optics during quick position changes or on the march.

The trigger mechanism displays an adjustable trigger pull of 1.0 to 1.5 kgf (2.2 to 3.3 lbf). The safety lever is located behind the bolt handle and the safety locks the trigger, immobilizes the sear and prevents the rotary bolt from turning.

The staggered (or double) column detachable box magazine is made out of glass fiber reinforced nylon with metal inserts and holds 10 rounds. To reduce recoil, jump, flash and sound signature, the SV-98 can be supplied with a TGP-V tactical suppressor. An anti-mirage strap can be fixed between the front and rear sights.

Internet sources report differing information regarding the attainable accuracy of fire, though the quality of the ammunition used is often mentioned as a very important factor in obtaining good accuracy.

== Variants ==
=== SV-98 (7.62 NATO caliber) ===
The SV-98 is chambered in 7.62 NATO for export orders that need the caliber.

=== KO-13 "Record" ===
A civilian version produced in 2010, this does not have provisions to install a suppressor and a carry handle.

=== SV-98M ===
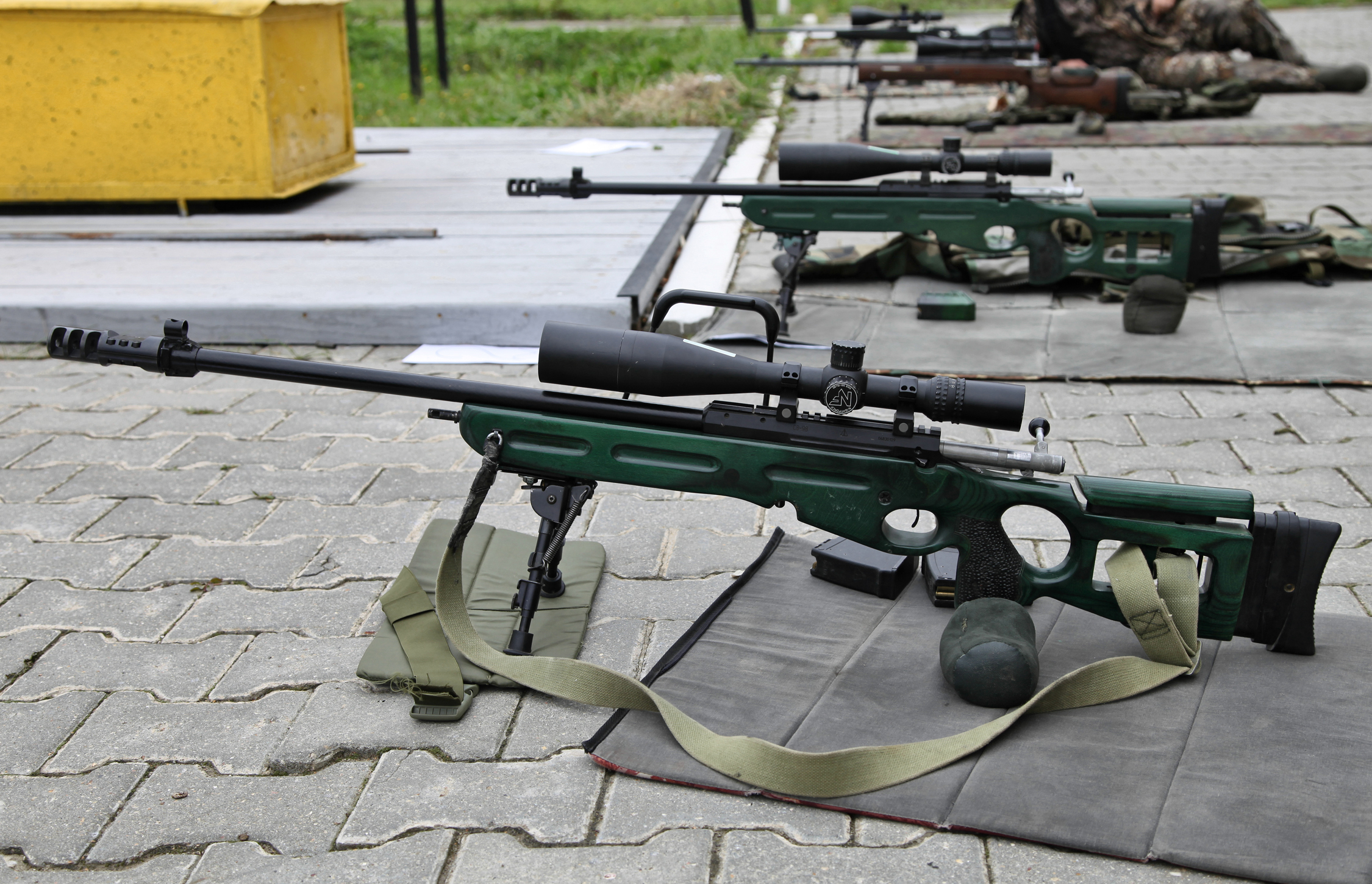
Multiple SV-98s placed for the Armourers Day sniping competition

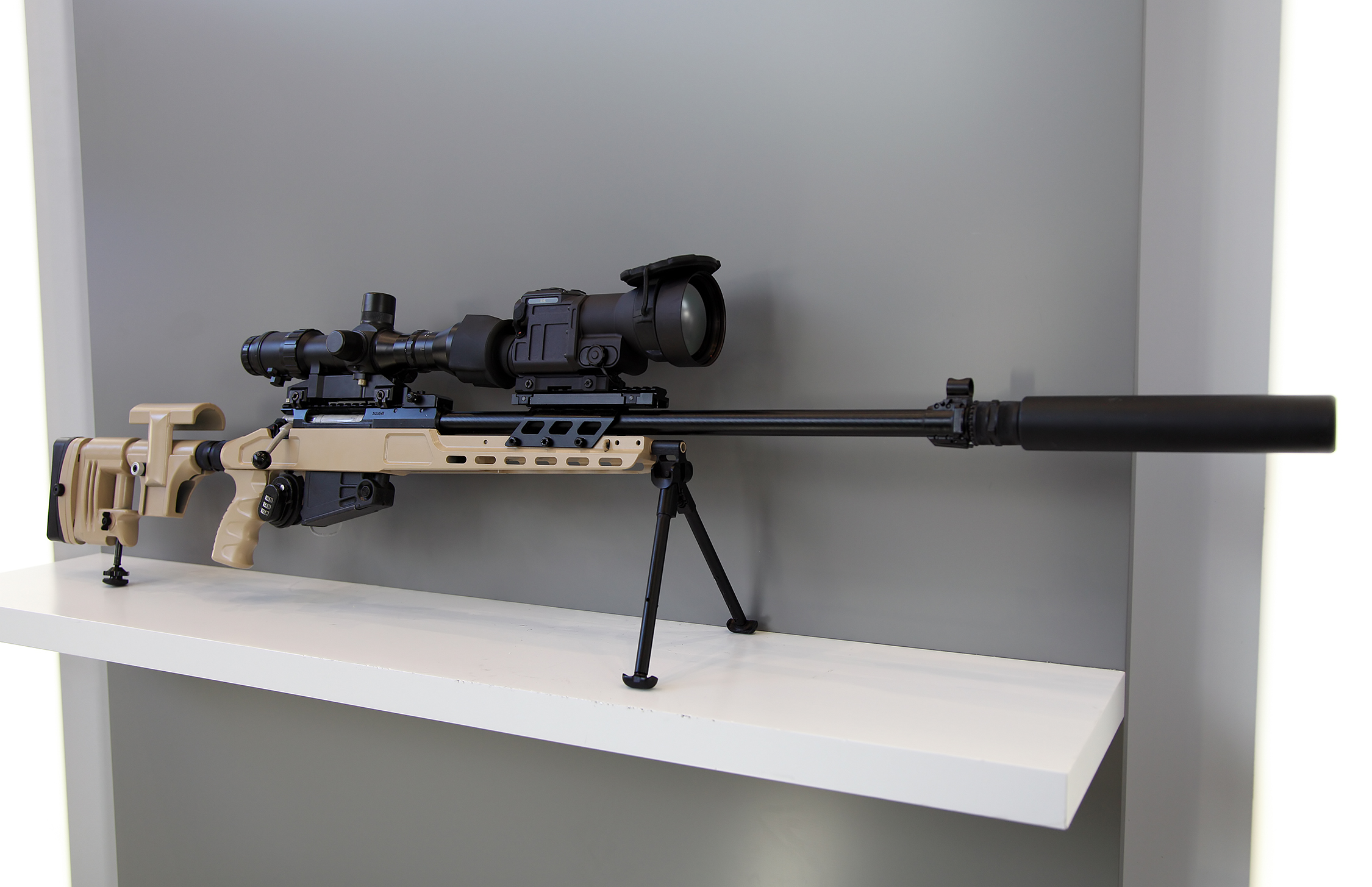
Kalashnikov SV-98 fitted with a 1P69 Hyperon 3–10×42 optical scope, which features an adjustable lightweight aluminum skeleton type stock

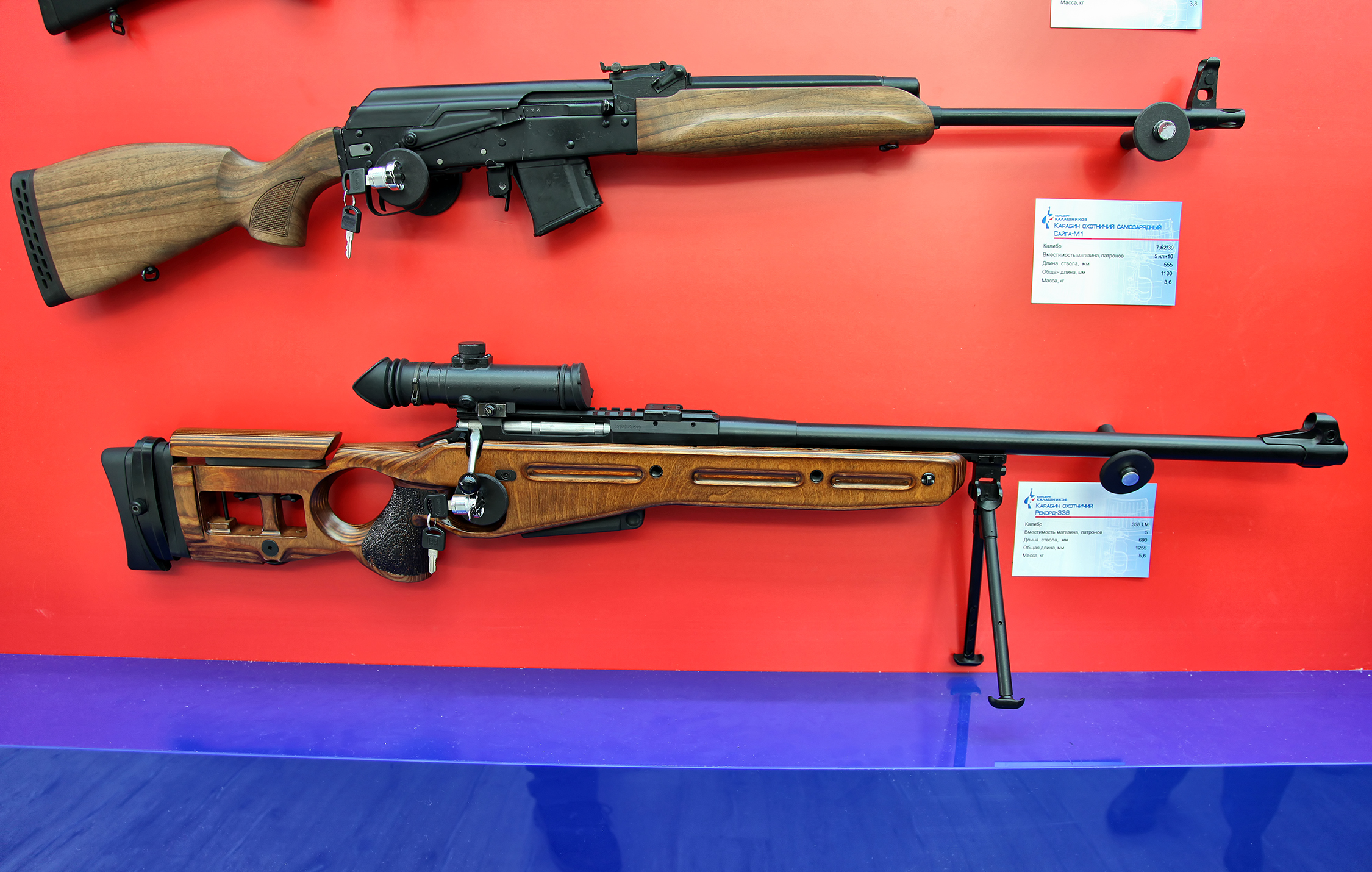
Record .338 Lapua Magnum rifle (bottom)

In 2013 an upgraded SV-98 variant was developed by Izhmash featuring an adjustable aluminum skeleton type stock. Izhmash expects the upgraded variant to be more economical to produce and offer improved maintainability and accuracy of fire. It has been tested by Izhmash since 2013. The upgraded sniper rifle features an aluminum alloy receiver providing enhanced performance and lower cost of production. The adjustable stock is ambidextrous. The buttstock length is adjustable and the position of the butt plate and comb adjusts by length and height. It also features a bipod in the forearm and a leg in the buttstock; adjustment of each leg is independent. In travel position the bipod is folded into the forearm, and the rear leg – into the buttstock, and, thus, do not enlarge the overall dimensions of the weapon.

The upgraded SV-98 can also be equipped with a tactical suppressor to reduce the sound blast, blowback and flash when it is being fired. It also features a Picatinny rail on top of the receiver to mount Russian-made and foreign-made optics. It comes with a standard 1P69 optical sight with a 3–10× variable magnification and is equipped with an open sight. The rifle safety catch locks the trigger, inerts the sear and prevents the rotary bolt from turning (unlocking).

In 2017 Kalashnikov Concern took over production of the SV-98. It has a lightweight skeleton stock made of aluminium alloys, a Picatinny rail for optical scopes on the top of its upper receiver, a folding stock, and an integrated bipod. It is chambered for the 7N1 or 7N14 7.62×54mmR sniper cartridges and has a magazine capacity of 10 rounds. The sniper rifle has a combat weight of 7.8 kg, a length of 1,200 mm (including a barrel of 650 mm), and an effective firing range of 1,000 m. It can be equipped with a suppressor instead of the organic muzzle brake to reduce the sound blast, blowback and flash when it is being fired. It is primarily intended for the snipers of the Russian Ground Forces.

According to a source in the local defence industry, the military has ordered a small batch of SV-98 sniper rifles for operational test and evaluation. The Kalashnikov SV-98 was introduced in service in May 2020.

=== SV-338, SV-338M, SV-338 M1 ===
Based on the Record full bore sport shooting rifle series Izhmash also developed the SV-338, SV-338M, and SV-338 M1 sniper rifles chambered for the .338 Lapua Magnum (8.6×70mm or 8.58×70mm) cartridge. These rifles feature scaled-up magnum bolt actions but are similar to the SV-98.

The first prototypes were made in 2000.

== Users ==
- Armenia: In 2010, 52 SV-98 units were purchased by Armenia.
- Russia: The SV-98 is used by Russian law enforcement and some counter-terrorist forces (FSB, Ministry of Justice of the Russian Federation, Ministry of Internal Affairs, FSO) and by sniper units of the Russian Armed Forces. As of 2015, it is the sniper rifle of the Russian Airborne Troops. In July 2018 an order was placed for the supply of 26 SV-98M units for the National Guard of Russia.
- Syria: Used by Syrian Republican Guard.
