= Kalashnikov Concern =

Russian weapons and motor vehicle manufacturer

Coordinates: 56°50′15″N 53°10′57″E

JSC Kalashnikov Concern

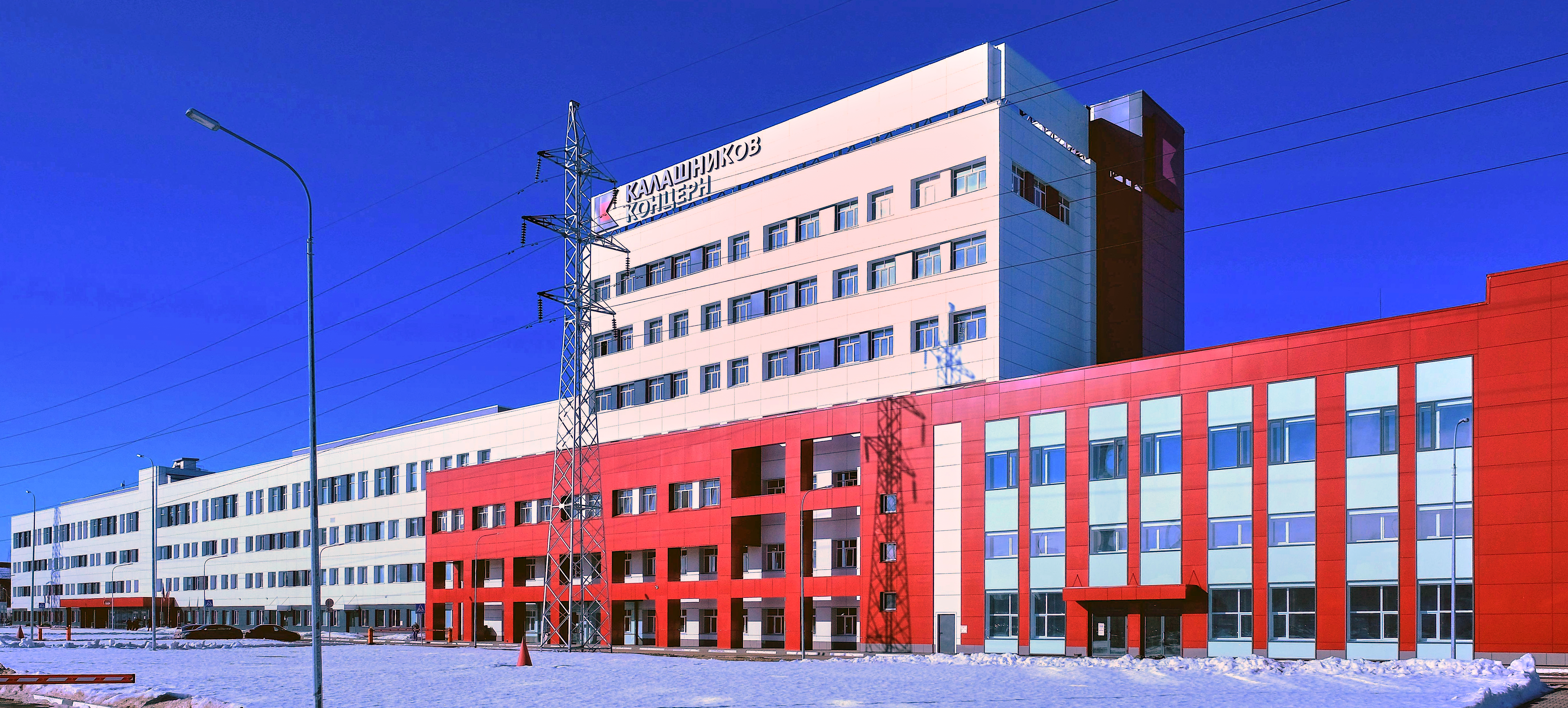
- Kalashnikov Concern office building in Izhevsk
- Native name: АО Концерн Калашников
- Type: Corporate group (Concern); Joint stock company
- Industry: Defense
- Predecessor: Izhmash; Izhmekh
- Founded: 10 June 1807 (219 years ago)
- Founder: Alexander I
- Headquarters: Moscow, Russia
- Area served: Worldwide
- Key people: Vladimir Lepin (CEO); Mikhail Kalashnikov
- Products: Firearms; Weapons; Vehicles; Unmanned vehicles Military robots Remote controlled weapon stations
- Revenue: 18,342,315,000 Russian ruble (2016)
- Operating income: 4,121,654,000 Russian ruble (2016)
- Net income: −7,370,000 Russian ruble (2016)
- Total assets: 22,500,181,000 Russian ruble (2016)
- Owner: Rostec (26%); Private investors (74%)
- Number of employees: 5,930 (2015)
- Parent: Rostec
- Divisions: Kalashnikov; Baikal; Izhmash
- Subsidiaries: Izhmash JSC; Baikal JSC; JSC "Mytishchi Machine Building Plant"; JSC "Vympel Shipbuilding Plant"; LLC "Rybinsk Shipyard"; ZALA Aero Group
- Website: en.kalashnikovgroup.ru

JSC Kalashnikov Concern (Russian: Концерн Калашников, romanized: Kontsern Kalashnikov, IPA: [kɐnˈt͡sɛrn kɐˈɫaʂnʲɪkəf]; Udmurt: Сюлмаськон Калашников), known until 2013 as the Izhevsk Machine-Building Plant (Russian: Иже́вский машинострои́тельный Заво́д (ИЖМАШ), romanized: Izhévsky mashinostroítelny Zavod (IZhMASh); Udmurt: Ижкар машиналэсьтонъя завод (ИЖМАШ)), is a Russian defense manufacturing concern and joint-stock company headquartered in the city of Izhevsk in the Republic of Udmurtia as well as in the capital city of Moscow. The concern designs and produces a wide range of civilian and military weapons including assault rifles, sniper rifles, designated marksman rifles, machine guns, squad automatic weapons, hunting rifles, shotguns, guided artillery projectiles, and a wide range of other precision weapons including remote controlled weapon stations, unmanned vehicles, and military robots.

The Kalashnikov Concern produces about 95% of all small arms in Russia and supplies to more than 27 countries around the world, making it the largest firearm manufacturer in Russia. Notable products include the Kalashnikov (AK) assault rifle series, the RPK light machine gun series, the Dragunov SVD semi-automatic sniper rifle, the SKS semi-automatic carbine, the Makarov PM pistol, the Saiga-12 shotgun, and the submachine guns Vityaz-SN and PP-19 Bizon. These firearms, except for the SVD, SKS and the PM, were based on the famous AK series, due to its reliability to endure harsh conditions, low production costs, availability in nearly every geographical region, and ease of use.

As of 2018, 26% of the Concern's shares belong to Rostec, while 74% of the company belongs to private investors (Alexey Krivoruchko and Andrei Bokarev).

The Concern contains three firearm brands: "Kalashnikov" (combat and civilian weapons), "Baikal" (hunting and civilian guns), and "Izhmash" (sporting rifles). The concern is developing new business lines that include remote weapon stations, unmanned aerial and ground vehicles, and multi-functional special-purpose boats.

== History ==
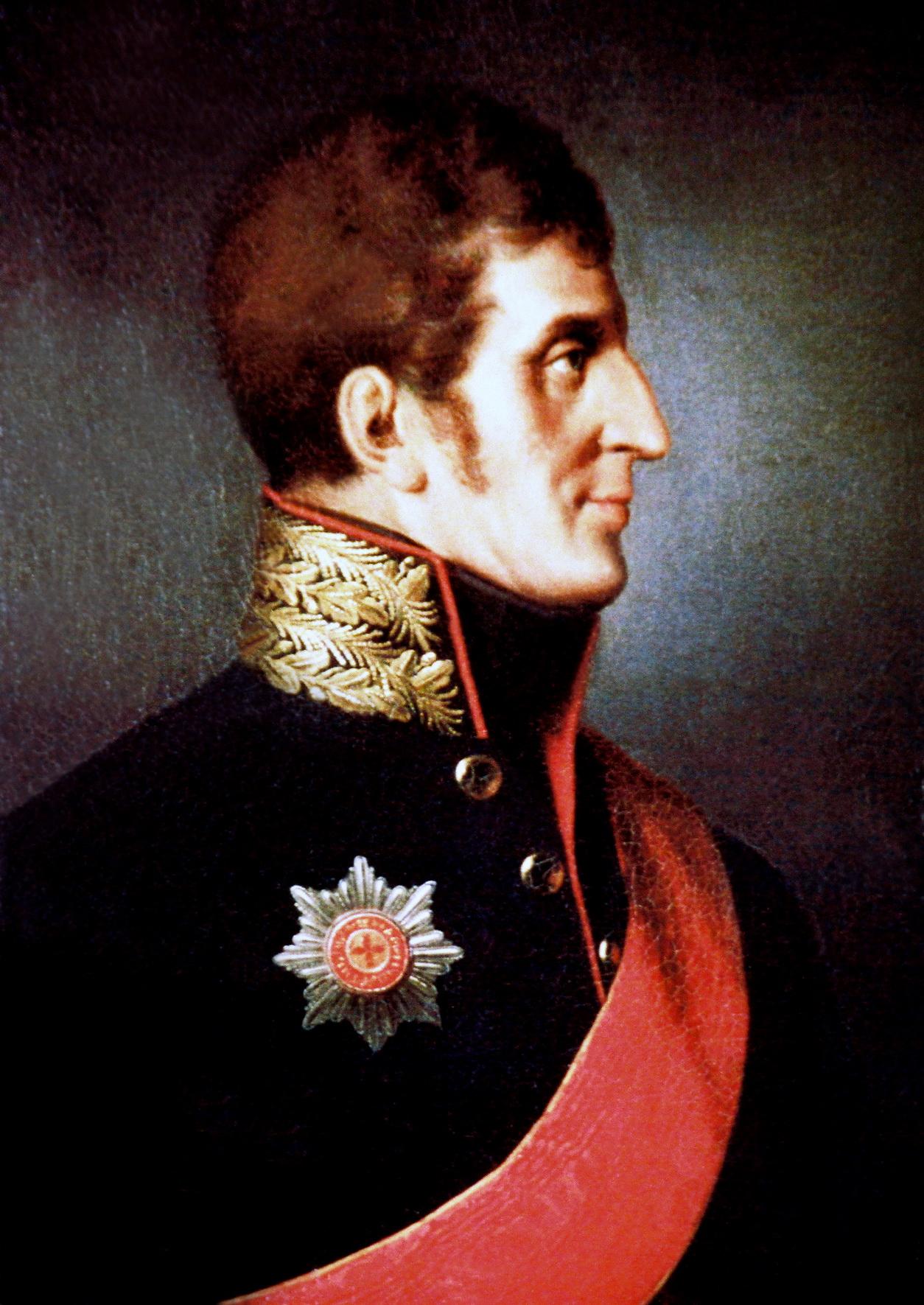
Andrey Deryabin, chief mining engineer of the Izhevsk iron works as well as head of the Izhevsk armory

=== First years ===
On 10 June 1807 by the decree of the Emperor of All Russias Alexander I a firearms factory was established in the city of Izhevsk, the construction and operation of which was headed by the chief mining engineer of the city ironworks Andrey Deryabin. Architects, Semyon Yemelyanovich Dudin and Andrey Deryabin developed a long-term master plan for further comprehensive development of the arsenal. Due to the proximity of the ironworks, the armory was supposed to be built on the bank of the Izh River, which immediately solved the problem of raw material supply.

Deryabin employed Russian and Udmurtian agricultural workers living in the city. At that time, agricultural workers had to settle in the arsenal and work there. Neighboring settlements were exempt from this rule, but they had to provide the arsenal with carts, horses and harnesses. Deryabin also hired foreign arsenal experts to train Russian craftsmen; in 1807 the arsenal produced seven long guns, five pistols and six backswords.

The first weapons developed by the armory were the No. 15 17.7mm muskets, produced in the autumn of 1807. In 1808, the musket was later mass-produced for infantry equipping. The plant supplied the Imperial Russian Army with over 6,000 of the No. 15 17.7mm muskets. In 1809, the arsenal produced rifles, muskets, carbines, and flint explosives for cavalry units. It also produced pistols and gun parts and remelted trophy weapons. During the Napoleonic Wars, especially during the French invasion of Russia, firearms were quickly produced for the Russian army, even though the arsenal had not been finished yet. In the first four years, the factory produced 2,000 long-barreled guns; in 1814, production increased to 10,000 guns and 2,500 swords; by 1830, desired annual output was 25,000 long-barreled guns and 5,000 backswords.

Between 1811 and 1816, ten stone factory buildings, several wooden buildings and the main tower-like building of the arsenal were constructed. In 1817, the construction of the main arsenal building was completed. This four-story building was one of the first multi-storey industrial buildings in Russia. The production process was multi-layered, starting with rough preparatory work (on the lower floors) and ending with the assembly of weapons (on the upper floors).

=== Mid to Late 1800s ===
Starting in the 1830s, the armory started manufacturing "Gartung" short rifles, "Phalis" breech-loading rifles, and boarding guns for the Baltic Fleet of the Imperial Russian Navy. In 1835, the armory transferred cold steel production of swords and lances to Zlatoust, focusing mainly on firearm production. In 1844, the armory started upgrading current guns into more rapid firing percussion muskets. The armory also started using the caplock mechanism for its products in 1845. During the Crimean War, Izhevsk supplied the Russian Imperial Army with 130,000 rifles, with a third of them rifled. By 1857, 50 years after the creation of the armory, over 670,000 flintlock firearms, over 220,000 percussion firearms, over 58 thousand rifles, as well as a plentiful number of swords and lances were produced.

In 1867, the armory was reorganized into a lease and a private commercial enterprise. At this time, the armory was retrofitted and equipped with steam-engines, new machines, and an open-hearth furnace. This allowed the armory to produce more breech-loading weapons for the Russian Imperial Army, notably the "Krnk" and "Berdan" type rifles. The Berdan rifle was the most widely produced firearm at the plant during the time as well, indirectly allowing Russia to approach the European industrial empires' level of armaments.

By 1870, production rate at the armory exceeded both the armories of Tula and Sestroretsk. Later, when the methods of high-quality steel production were well mastered, Izhevsk became the source of gun barrels and barrel receivers for Russian plants. For example, armory enterprises in Tula used annually up to 360,000 barrels from the armory at Izhevsk. In 1884, the plant was later returned to the state and became Izhevsk Gun and Steel Factories (IGSF). In 1885, IGSF started manufacturing hunting weapons and tools. In 1891, IGSF started mass-producing the Mosin–Nagant rifle. The IGSF also started using DC generators to produce electricity to illuminate the plant as well as to power the machines. The IGSF was the only Russian enterprise that produced firearms for all branches of the Russian military. Thanks to the IGSF, Izhevsk became a large industrial center in Russia.

=== World War I and the Interwar Period ===
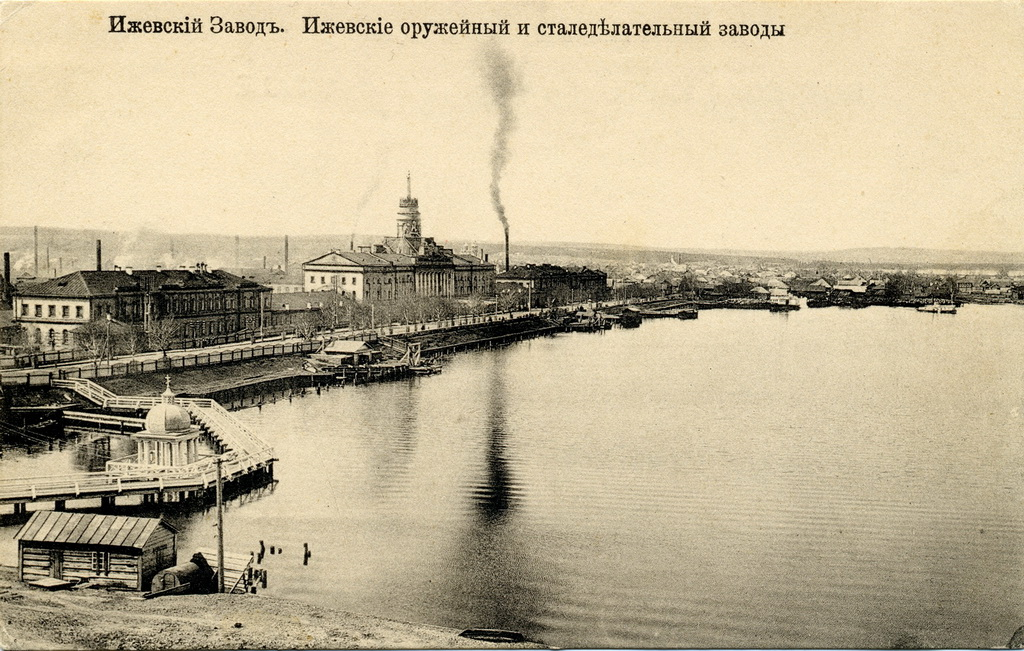
Izhevsk Gun and Steel Factories around 1916

During the First World War, IGSF supplied the Imperial Russian Army with over 1.4 million new rifles and approximately 188,000 remelted shoulder weapons. Prior to the Russian Revolution, the IGSF took leading positions of the Russian defense industry in terms of manufacturing and manpower capacity. By 1917, about 34,000 people worked at IGSF. In 1918, a design bureau was established in the IGSF.

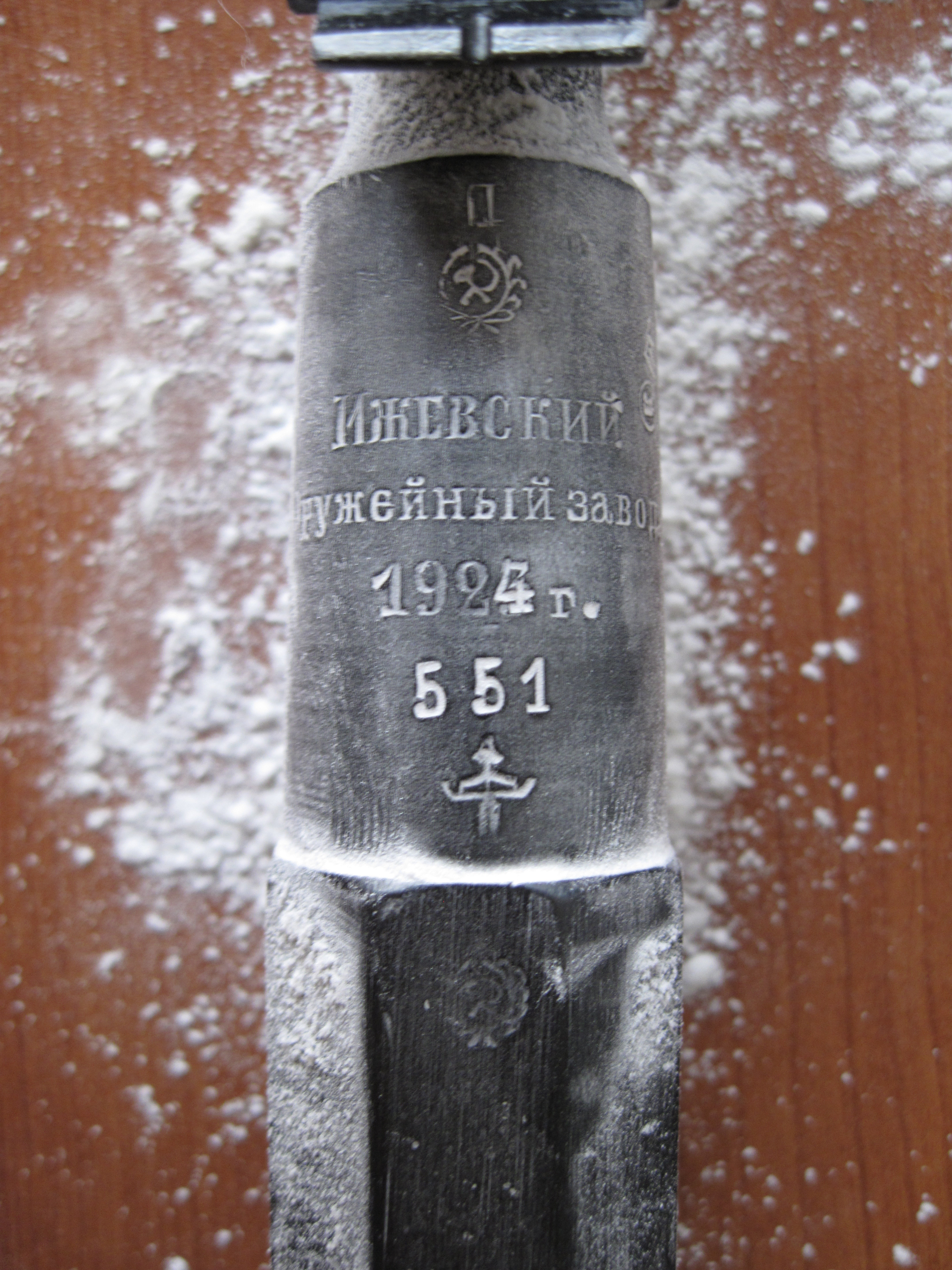
Stamp on a Mosin-Nagant rifle of the 1924 issue with a hexagonal receiver, Izhevsk Gun and Steel Factories

After the formation of the Soviet Union in 1922, large changes came to the IGSF. The state's first hunting gun factory was opened on the enterprise's premises in the same year. The IGSF required more highly trained personnel in order to accommodate new production and to work on newer machines. Thus, by 1929, IGSF-bound personnel had to be trained at the Izhevsk Technical School. In 1930, a new open-hearth furnace was put into operation and in-house production of machines at the factory was launched.

More re-organization took place in the 1930s, including the conversion of the IGSF into a Chief Designer Bureau, as well as the adoption and production of several new models of firearms: a modified Mosin–Nagant rifle design of 1891/1930, the battle rifle AVS-36, made by Sergei Simonov, and the SVT-38 self-loading rifle and the TT pistol, made by Fedor Tokorev. This gave rise to a flow line method of production. In 1938, the conveyor belt was implemented into the assembly of gun barrels and other parts, greatly increasing the production rate of firearms for the Soviet Army. In 1933, a New Design Bureau, "BNK", was established at the factory to develop and modify firearms. Today, the bureau is named the "Armory Design Center" (KOC). In the bureau's lifetime, about 300 models of small-arms, air ordnance, sport, hunting weapons, and other types of equipment were developed, most of which was in series production at the plant. In 1939, the main plant of the IGSF, Plant No. 180, was split into two independent enterprises: Metallurgical Plant No. 71 and Engineering Plant No. 74, which manufactured weapons. Engineering Plant No. 74 would later be renamed the Izhevsk Machine-Building Plant, or simply, Izhmash.

=== World War II ===
During World War II, Engineering Plant No. 74 served as the main firearm manufacturer for the Soviet Armed Forces. Since Operation Barbarossa left the Soviet Union in a very desperate position, the plant produced as many firearms as it was physically capable of, more firearms than its lifespan for 92 years prior. From 1941 to 1942, the plant set up mass production of Vasily Degtyarev's PTRD anti-tank rifle, Sergei Simonov's PTRS-41 anti-tank rifle, the Berezin UB aircraft machine gun armament, the 37mm Shpitalny Sh-37 and Nudelman-Suranov NS-37 aircraft guns, and sniper rifles with optic sights, along with the TT pistol and the Nagant M1895 revolver. A total of 11,450,000 rifles and carbines were produced in the plant, exceeding all the combined German firearm manufacturers' outputs of 10.3 million. Besides firearms, the plant also produced over 15,000 aircraft guns and over 130,000 anti-tank weapons.

On 20 July 1942, Plant No. 622 separated itself from Plant No. 74, using equipment transferred from the evacuated mechanical plants at Tula and Podolsk. During the war, the plant manufactured more than 1 million pistols and 200,000 anti-tank rifles. Plant No. 622 would later be renamed as the Izhevsk Mechanical Plant, or simply, Izhmekh.

=== Post-World War II ===
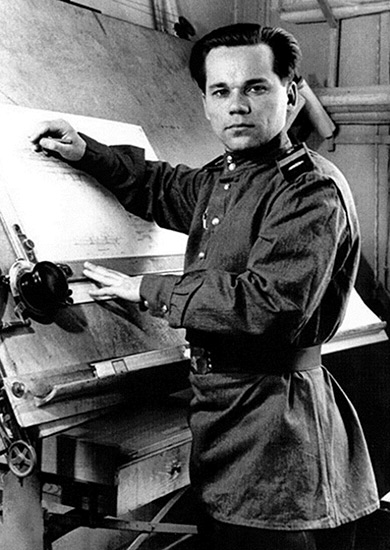
Mikhail Kalashnikov, c. 1944

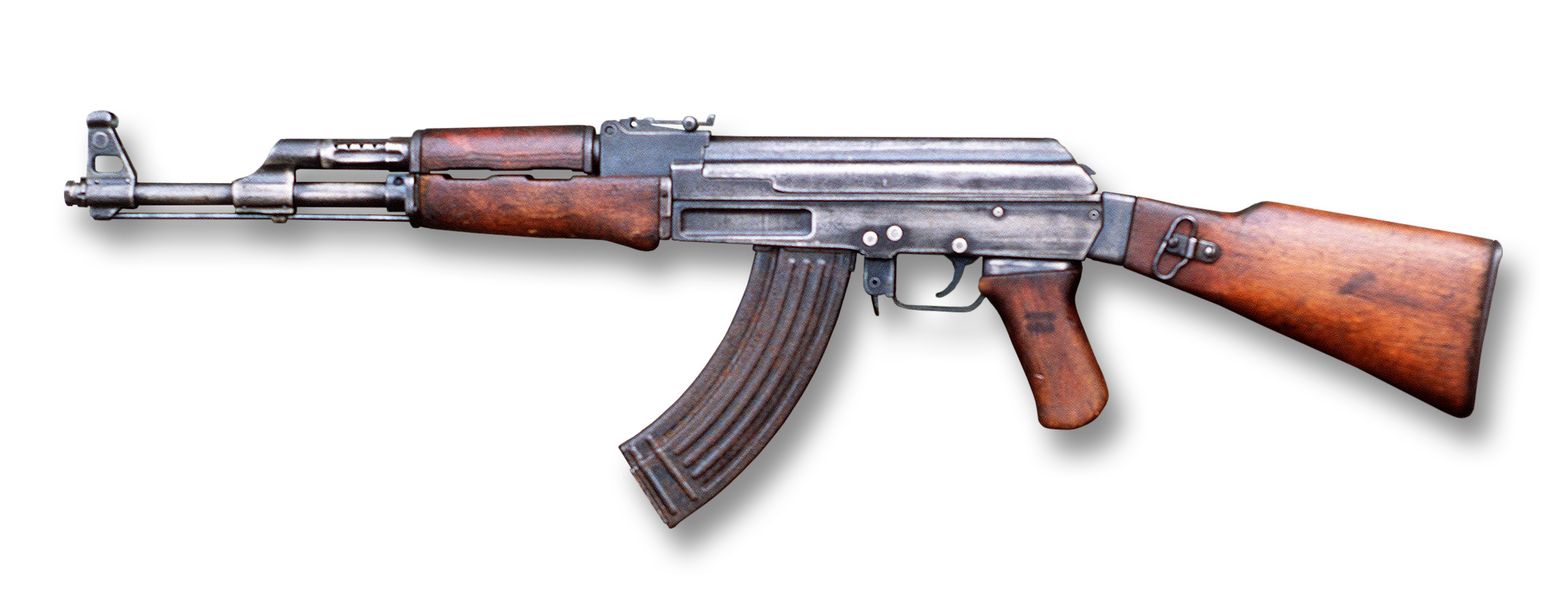
A Type 2 AK-47, the first machined receiver variation

After World War II, the Izhevsk Machine-Building Plant later recovered the production of its civilian arms and transportation. The plant also hired war veteran and ex-tank driver and mechanic, Mikhail T. Kalashnikov, after noticing his submachine gun design that gave him distinction as a gun designer. In 1947, Kalashnikov created his assault rifle, the 7.62×39mm AK-47. The AK-47 became the standard rifle of the Soviet Army in the same year, and later grew popular around the world. The AK-47 gave the plant fame and newer potential in the arms industry. The plant also created newer hunting weapons based out of the Mosin–Nagant rifle as well as sporting weapons. These sporting weapons helped the Soviet Union's team to win shooting competitions in European championships and the Summer Olympic Games numerous times.

Kalashnikov later designed newer firearms: the AKM and the AK-74 assault rifle, the RPK light machine gun, and the PK belt-fed machine gun. These firearms helped contribute to greater firepower for the Soviet Army as well as numerous nations that had imported them. Izhevsk Machine-Building Plant gun designer Yevgeny Dragunov also help contribute to the plant's fame by creating his SVD sniper rifle. Designed in 1963 and based out of sporting rifles, the SVD became the squad support weapon for the Soviet Army in the same year as well as starting a new trend of semi-automatic sniper rifles.

In 1975, the Izhevsk Machine-Building Plant changed its name to the Izhmash Industrial Association.

=== Contemporary Era ===
After the dissolution of the Soviet Union, Izhmash struggled with a decline in demand and competition with overseas firearm manufacturers. As a result, Izhmash created the Saiga semi-automatic rifle, and started producing the Tigr, a civilian version of the SVD which was created back in the 1970s, in batches. Izhmash also expanded to the Western market, which was extremely successful, especially with the Saiga. Izhmash also created two new sniper rifles, the SV-98 and the SV-99, which had a more enhanced fire precision than the regular SVD, for special units of the Russian Armed Forces.

Despite the success, by 2008, Izhmash was composed of numerous enterprises that were on the verge of bankruptcy. The Russian state corporation, Rostekhnologii (Russian Technologies, now Rostec), revealed the poor state Izhmash was in by 2010. Only 32 companies of Izhmash were actually operating with a multi-level management system, high overheads and doubled up functions. The combined liability of Izhmash in early 2011 was ₽19 billion. The use of the existing modern equipment hardly exceeded 20%.

As a result, Rostec took control of Izhmash and started restructuring and consolidating the company in 2011. According to Rostec, one of the objectives was to retain its research, industrial and human resources and turn Izhmash into a leading global small arms manufacturer. Izhmash was later reestablished through assets consolidation by 2012. As a result, there was a threefold increase in profits and a 10% cut in costs. In 2011, Izhmash increased the utilization rate of modern multipurpose equipment from 20% to 70%. The effect from the efforts to enhance production performance amounts to ₽100 million.

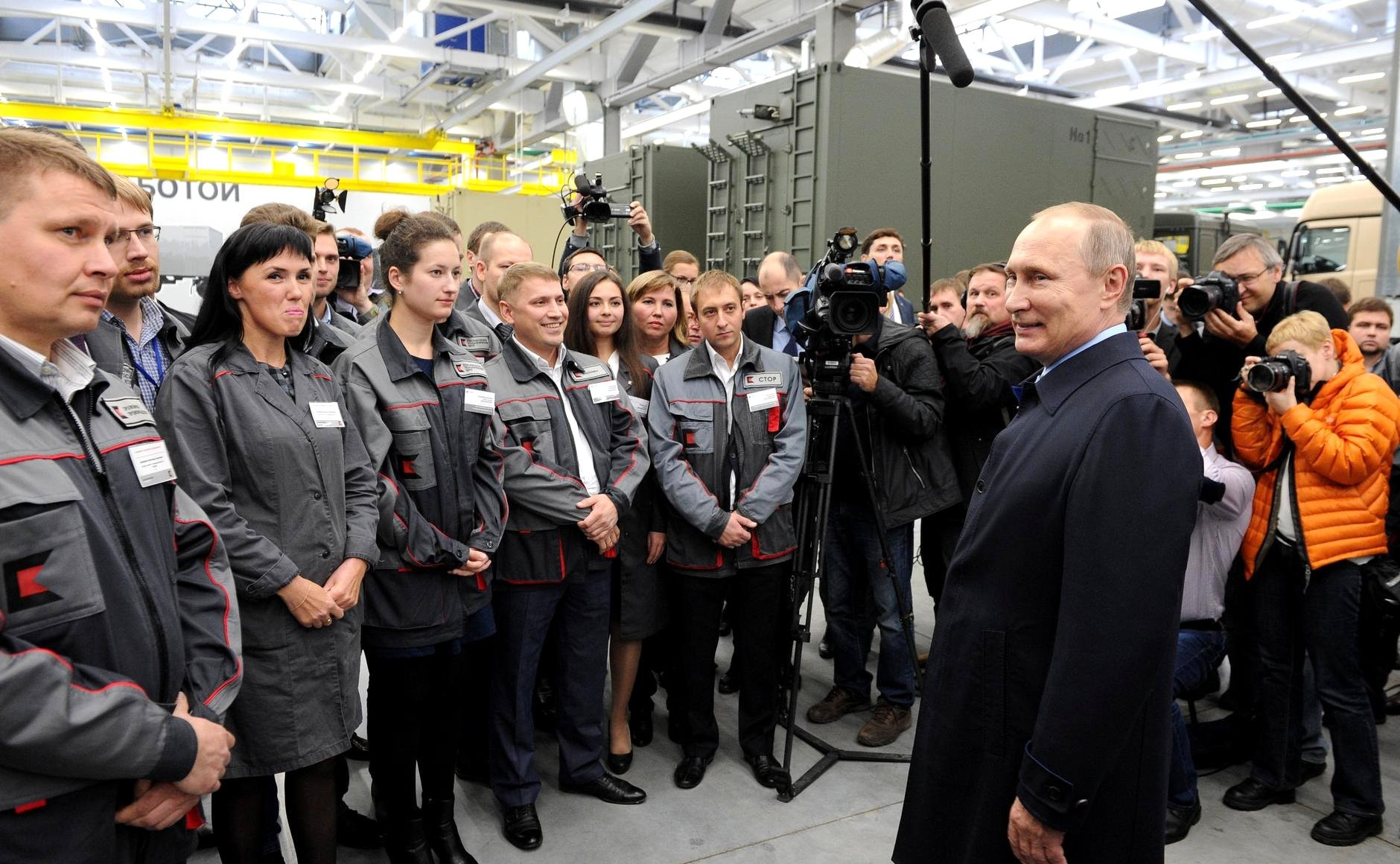
Russian President Vladimir Putin meeting with workers of Kalashnikov Concern in September 2016

=== Kalashnikov Concern ===
On 13 August 2013, Izhmash and Izhmekh (formerly Izhevsk Mechanical Plant) merged, with the new concern named Kalashnikov Concern. Thanks to the merger, Kalashnikov Concern is Russia's largest and most important arms manufacturer.

In July 2014, Kalashnikov Concern was sanctioned by the United States and the European Union as a result of the Russian annexation of Crimea and Russian military intervention in Ukraine. Since Europe and the United States were the largest customers of the concern's civilian firearms, the concern was forced to rethink its marketing strategy. The concern opened five new markets and started selling its civilian firearms to ten new foreign countries, which helped the concern make up for its losses.

In the same year, Kalashnikov Concern has presented "Strategy 2020", which includes technical re-equipment and production modernization. When implemented, the project will qualitatively improve production technology and greatly reduce running costs and energy consumption while also improving working conditions and overall productivity.

On 9 February 2017, Rostec's management board gave permission to transfer Kalashnikov Concern to private investors. As of now, Rostec owns 26% of the concern while private investors own 74%.

In 2022, the Concern had reportedly achieved a 40% record yearly increase in weapons production for domestic needs and for export and also completed one licensed production agreement. The Concern reported in May 2023 that it had achieved a 10-year record in weapons deliveries during the first quarter of the year and that it has established a drone production unit. It was reported in late August 2023 that the production of 9K121 Vikhr, Strela and Kitolov missiles rose almost 1.5 fold. The company said in January 2024 that the government contracts for sniper rifles had increased by 8 times in the past year. It was also said that the production of "special equipment" increased by 45% in 2023 and the production of combat pistols by 5 times. The company reported in February 2024 that the production of drones has increased by 60% since 2022. Kalashnikov reported in May 2024 that during the first quarter of the year it had increased the civilian production output by 50% and the firearms production by 9% at comparison with the same period of 2023 and also raised revenues by 37% and started to supply upgraded AK-12 assault rifles of the 2023 model. In the next month, the Concern reportedly started supplies of the civilian electrically-powered and VTOL Legionnaire drone which is used for cargo delivery, terrain sensing and video monitoring. Supplies of the Stena special vehicles begun in July 2024. On 22 July 2024, the company claimed that production of military and civilian goods has increased by 50% during the first half of the year. On 3 October 2024, the company reported that it is ramping up the production of aircraft guns because of a multiple growth of order volumes. On 22 November 2024, the company stated that it had completed the 2024 state order for small arms ahead of schedule. On 28 January 2025, the Kalashnikov reported that it had achieved a 10-year record high revenue from export contracts for both military and civilian small arms in 2024. In January 2026, the company started to supply the Russian Army with electric motorcycles and electric scooters. In February 2026, the company completed development and started offering for export the Rus-PE loitering munition. In April 2026, the company reported that it has supplied a large batch of AK-203 assault rifles to a foreign customer and completed export obligations for the year ahead of schedule. In May 2026, the Fortis unmanned aerial vehicle-carrier of FPV-drones was first presented. Export licenses for the new shortened and sub-compact versions of the 5.45 mm AK-12 and 7.62 mm AK-15 assault rifles were also issued. Deliveries of the Skat 220 reconnaissance drone begun in June 2026. In September 2026, the company first presented two anti-drone air defense systems: the Zveroboy which is equipped with FPV interceptor drones and the stationary or vehicle-mounted Kalitka-KA which is already reportedly used in Ukraine.

== Organization ==
JSC "Kalashnikov Concern" has its headquarters in city of Izhevsk and the Khamovniki District in the capital city of Moscow.

JSC "Kalashnikov Concern" is composed of the two largest firearm manufacturers in Izhevsk:

- JSC "Kalashnikov Concern" – JSC "Kalashnikov Concern" produces and tests combat small arms, sporting and hunting weapons, aircraft guns, precision guided artillery shells, test and control machines of complexes, as well as machines and high-quality tools. This company is also the mother company of the holding company JSC "Kalashnikov Concern" as well. The company is formerly known as the Izhevsk Machine-Building Plant, also known as Izhmash.
- JSC "Izhevsk Mechanical Plant" – Also known as Izhmekh, the Izhevsk Mechanical Plant is focusing on modern technologies of machine building, metallurgy, instrument making, microelectronics, producing civil and service weapons, power tools, packaging equipment, oil and gas equipment, medical equipment, precision steel casting.

JSC "Kalashnikov Concern" divides its firearm products into three brands.

- Kalashnikov – Kalashnikov produces military weapons such as firearms as well as vehicles.
- Baikal – Baikal produces hunting firearms and jackets
- Izhmash – Izhmash creates sporting firearms out of the basis of weapons of Kalashnikov Concern.

JSC "Kalashnikov Concern" has four subsidiaries:

- JSC "Mytishchi Machine Building Plant" – The JSC "Mytishchi Machine Building Plant" specializes in caterpillar chassis as well as tracked vehicles.
- JSC "Vympel Shipbuilding Plant" – JSC "Vympel Shipbuilding Plant" produces civilian, military, and utility boats.
- LLC "Rybinsk Shipyard" – LLC "Rybinsk Shipyard" is a shipbuilding company that produces high-speed boats and motor yachts.
- Zala Aero – Zala Aero is actually composed of several companies, and produces mainly unmanned aerial vehicles.

== Corporate governance ==
Vladimir Grodetsky, who headed Izhmash NPO since 1996 as general director left the bureau in 2011. He was later replaced by Maxim Kuzyuk, who left the bureau in June 2012. Alexander Kosov was later appointed as a temporary general director of the bureau from June to December. In December 2012, Konstantin Busygin was appointed general director of Izhmash. Busygin was later responsible for transformation of Izhmash and Izhmekh into the JSC "Kalashnikov" Concern, of which he became CEO.

On 30 January 2014, Rostec's supervisory board approved the appointment of Alexei Krivoruchko, its new shareholder, as CEO of the Kalashnikov Concern, replacing Konstantin Busygin. He took up his duties on 31 January 2014. According to the interlocutor of the agency, since 2011, this is the fourth change of the general director at the enterprise.

In August 2021 Vladimir Lepin was appointed Kalashnikov Concern CEO in place of Dmitry Tarasov.

=== General Directors of Izhmash NPO (1993–2013) ===
- Vladimir Grodetsky (1996–2011)
- Maxim Kuzyuk (2011 – June 2012)
- Alexander Kosov (acting: June 2012 – December 2012)
- Konstantin Busygin (December 2012 – August 2013)

=== CEOs of Kalashnikov Concern (2013–present) ===
- Konstantin Busygin (August 2013 – January 2014)
- Alexei Krivoruchko (January 2014 – June 2018)
- Vladimir Dmitriyev (June 2018 - August 2019)
- Dmitry Tarasov (September 2019 - August 2021)
- Vladimir Lepin (August 2021 – present)

== Products ==
=== Izhevsk Arsenal ===
Although the arsenal was under construction in 1807, production of weapons immediately started: mainly long guns, pistols, and backswords. One notable long gun the arsenal made was the No. 15 17.7mm muskets, of which 6,000 of them were supplied to the Imperial Russian Army. The arsenal later manufactured rifles, muskets, carbines, and flint blunderbusses for cavalry in 1809. The venture also produced pistols and gun parts and remelted trophy weapons. Firearms were produced at a rapid pace for the Russian Army during the Napoleonic Wars, mainly in the French invasion of Russia, even though construction of the armory had not been finished yet. During the first four years, the factory produced 2,000 long guns. In 1814, the output grew up to 10,000 guns and almost 2,500 backswords. By 1830, the armory achieved the desired annual output of 25,000 long guns and 5,000 backswords.

Starting in the 1830s, the armory started manufacturing "Gartung" short rifles, "Phalis" breech-loading rifles, and boarding guns for the Baltic Fleet of the Imperial Russian Navy. In 1835, the armory transferred cold steel production of swords and lances to Zlatoust, focusing mainly on firearm production. In 1844, the armory started upgrading current guns into more rapid firing percussion muskets. The armory also started using the caplock mechanism for its products in 1845. During the Crimean War, Izhevsk supplied the Russian Imperial Army with 130,000 rifles, with a third of them grooved. By 1857, 50 years after the creation of the armory, over 670,000 flintlock firearms, over 220,000 percussion firearms, over 58 thousand rifles, as well as a plentiful number of swords and lances were produced. When the methods of high-quality steel production were well mastered, Izhevsk became the source of gun barrels and barrel receivers for Russian plants. For example, armory enterprises in Tula used annually up to 360,000 barrels from the armory at Izhevsk.

In 1867, the armory was reorganized into a lease and a private commercial enterprise. At this time, the armory were renovated and it was equipped with steam-engines, new machines, and an open-hearth furnace. This allowed the armory to produce more breech-loading weapons for the Russian Imperial Army, notably the "Krnk" and "Berdan" type rifles. The Berdan rifle, designed by American firearm expert and inventor Hiram Berdan, became the standard-issue rifle of the Imperial Russian Army in 1870. The Berdan rifle was the most produced firearm of the plant at the time as well, allowing Russia to approach the European industrial empires' level of armaments.

==== Bolt-action rifles ====
Name	Berdan rifle
Image	
Year	1870–1891

=== Izhevsk Gun and Steel Factories ===
In 1884, the plant was returned to the state and became Izhevsk Gun and Steel Factories (IGSF). In 1885, IGSF started manufacturing hunting weapons and tools. In 1891, IGSF started mass-producing the Mosin–Nagant bolt-action military rifle in a development of nine years, based on the design of the 1898 Mauser rifle (Gewehr 98) with new unique features such as a push feed recessed bolt head. In addition to being one of the most produced rifles in mass-produced military bolt-action rifles in history, the Nagant is also used in every war from the time it was developed to the modern day. The rifle was produced from both the Imperial period and the Soviet era, with military production concluded in 1965, but production for civilian use is continued to the modern day. In addition to the Mosin–Nagant rifle, Belgian industrialist Léon Nagant, who was a co-inventor of, developed the Nagant M1895 revolver. The revolver has a unique "gas-seal" system that provides a boost to muzzle velocity as well as make the weapon eligible to be suppressed. The sidearm, like the Nagant rifle, was produced in the Soviet era as well, and was mass-produced and used widespread.

==== Battle rifles ====
Name	AVS-36	SVT-40
Image		
Year	1936–1940	1940–1945
==== Bolt-action rifles ====
Name	Mosin–Nagant	–
Image		–
Year	1891–1965	–
==== Handguns ====
Name	Nagant M1895	TT pistol
Image		
Year	1895–1945	1930–1952

=== Izhevsk Machine-Building Plant ===
==== Aircraft guns ====
Name	Shpitalny Sh-37	Nudelman-Suranov NS-37	–	–
Image	-		–	–
Year	1941–1942	1942–1945	–	–
==== Anti-tank rifles ====
Name	PTRD	PTRS-41	–	–
Image			–	–
Year	1941–1945	1941–1945	–	–
==== Automatic rifles ====
Name	AK-47	AKM	AK-74	–
Image				–
Year	1951-1957	1959–1978	1974–1991	–
==== Carbines ====				
Name	SKS	–	–	–
Image		–	–	–
Year	1953–1954	–	–	–
==== Handguns ====
Name	Makarov pistol	PB	–	–
Image			–	–
Year	1949–present	1967–present	–	–
==== Machine guns ====				
Name	Berezin UB	RPK	PK	RPK-74
Image				
Year	1941–1945	1961–1978	1961–present	1978–1991
==== Sniper rifles ====
Name	Dragunov SVD	-	–	
Image		-	–	
Year	1963–present	-	–	

=== Izhmash ===
==== Aircraft guns ====
Name	Gryazev-Shipunov GSh-30-1	–	–	–	–
Image		–	–	–	–
Year	1980–present	–	–	–	–
==== Handguns ====
Name	MP-446 Viking	MP-443 Grach			
Image					
Year	2001–present	2003–present			
==== Assault rifles ====
Name	AK-74M	AN-94	AK-103	AK-101	AK-107/AK-108
Image					
Year	1991–present	1994–2006	1994–present	1994–present	mid-1990s–present
Name	AK-9	AK-12 (AK-200)	–	–	–
Image			–	–	–
Year	Early 2000s–present	2010-2016	–	–	–
==== Carbines ====
Name	AK-102	AK-104	AK-105	–	–
Image				–	–
Year	1994–present	1994–present	1994–present	–	–
==== Civilian ====
Name	Saiga semi-automatic rifle	–	–	–	–
Image		–	–	–	–
Year	1990s–present	–	–	–	–
==== Machine guns ====
Name	RPK-74M	–	–	–	–
Image		–	–	–	–
Year	1991–present	–	–	–	–
==== Shotguns ====
Name	Saiga-12	–	–	-	–
Image		–	–	-	–
Year	1997–present	–	–	-	–
==== Sniper rifles ====
Name	SVDS	SVDM	SV-98	-	–
Image				-	–
Year	1990s–present	1990s–present	1998–present	-	–
==== Submachine guns ====
Name	PP-91 "Kedr"	PP-19 "Bizon"	Vityaz-SN	–	–
Image				–	–
Year	1994–present	1994–present	2008–present	–	–

=== Kalashnikov Concern ===
==== Assault rifles ====
Name	AK-12 (AK-400)	AK-15	AK-203	AK-19/AK19
Image				
Year	2016–present	2016–present	2019–present	2020–present
==== Battle rifles ====
Name	AK-308	–	–	–
Image		–	–	–
Year	2018–present	–	–	–
==== Handguns ====
Name	Lebedev PL-15	–	–	–
Image		–	–	–
Year	2016–present	–	–	–
==== Machine guns ====
Name	RPK-16	RPL-20	–	–
Image			–	–
Year	2016–present		–	–
==== Semi-automatic rifles ====
Name	Kalashnikov SR-1	–	–	–
Image		–	–	–
Year	2018–present	–	–	–
==== Sniper rifles ====
Name	Chukavina SVCh	SV-98M	–	–
Image			–	–
Year	2016–present	2016–present	–	–

==== Kalashnikov CV-1 ====
On 23 August 2018, Kalashnikov Concern introduced a new electric car prototype, the CV-1. Its exterior design was based on the rare 1970s Soviet large family car IZh 2125 "Kombi". The range on one charge was claimed to be 350 km.

==== Kalashnikov UV-4 ====
Alongside the reveal of the CV-1, Kalashnikov also showed a prototype for the UV-4 4-door electric quadricycle, with a taxi variant being revealed in August 2019. The UV-4 was shown again in patent images later in November 2021, this time along with a 3-wheel, 2-door vehicle based on it.

== See also ==
Kalashnikov USA

- Defense industry of Russia
- List of companies of Russia
- List of modern armament manufacturers
  - Other Russian firearm companies
    - OJSC Degtyarev Plant
    - OJSC Vyatskiye Polyany Molot Machine-Building Plant
    - TsNIITochMash
    - TsKIB SOO
  - International large firearm companies
    - Colt's Manufacturing Company
    - FN Herstal
    - Heckler & Koch
    - SIG Sauer
    - Fabryka Broni
