= Iran, North Korea, Syria Nonproliferation Act =

2000 Act of the United States Congress

The Iran, North Korea, Syria Nonproliferation Act (INKSNA), also known as the Iran Nonproliferation Act of 2000, is an act of the 109th United States Congress.

The act was initially titled the Iran Nonproliferation Act. In 2005 and 2006, Syria and North Korea were added, respectively. The act was then called the Iran, North Korea, Syria, Nonproliferation Act. Several companies are sanctioned under INKSNA.

Waivers of the provisions of this act have been required to allow NASA to purchase launch services from Russia, in order to support its crewed space program in the period of some years between the retirement of the Space Shuttle and the availability of its successor.
