= CAVIM =

Venezuelan state-owned firearms manufacturer

Compañía Anónima Venezolana de Industrias Militares
- Native name: Spanish: Compañía Anónima Venezolana de Industrias Militares
- Company type: State-owned company
- Industry: Defense
- Founded: April 29, 1975; 51 years ago
- Headquarters: Caracas, Capital District, Venezuela
- Area served: Worldwide
- Products: Ammunitions, firearms, explosive
- Owner: Venezuelan Ministry of People's Power for Defense
- Website: www.cavim.com.ve

CAVIM (Compañía Anónima Venezolana de Industrias Militares or Venezuelan Company of Military Industries in English) is a Venezuelan state-owned firearms manufacturer, which was created on April 29, 1975.

== History ==
CAVIM was created on April 29, 1975 under Presidential Decree No. 883 of the then President of Venezuela Carlos Andrés Pérez on 29 April 1975.

=== Sanctions ===
The company was placed under U.S. sanctions in 2013 under the Iran, North Korea, and Syria Nonproliferation Act (INKSNA).

== Products ==
=== Firearms ===
CAVIM manufactured the Zamorana in 2006, which is Venezuela's first indigenous small arm. This was made with some parts from the Czech Republic.

In 2019 they began the production of CAVIM Caribe a bullpup sub machine gun.

The AK-103 was also licensed to CAVIM for manufacturing in Venezuela with initial licensing fee payments made in 2006 and the transfer of Russian-made AK-103s to Venezuela in 2008. CAVIM's AK-103 factories opened officially in 2012 without the necessary manufacturing equipment. CAVIM-made AK-103s were delivered to the Venezuelan Army in 2013.

Due to trouble with the plant with the Russian contractor failing to meet deadlines with a case of fraud, which forced CAVIM to finish the rest of the construction, full-scale production was initially stated to start in 2019, but the first stage of the plant was finally launched on 2 July 2025.

In 2016, CAVIM unveiled the M66 Cazador mortar for the Venezuelan Marine Corp.

=== UAVs ===
CAVIM unveiled the Arpia, a licensed version of the Qods Mohajer in 2012, although it was first shown restricted to VIPs in November 2011 at the El Libertador Air Base after Iran and Venezuela signed an agreement to purchase the Mojader in 2007.

== Organization ==
CAVIM is run by the Venezuelan Ministry of People's Power for Defense. It is based in Caracas.
