= List of military headstamps =

A headstamp is the marking on the bottom of a cartridge case designed for a firearm. It usually tells who manufactured the case. Military headstamps usually have only the year of manufacture .

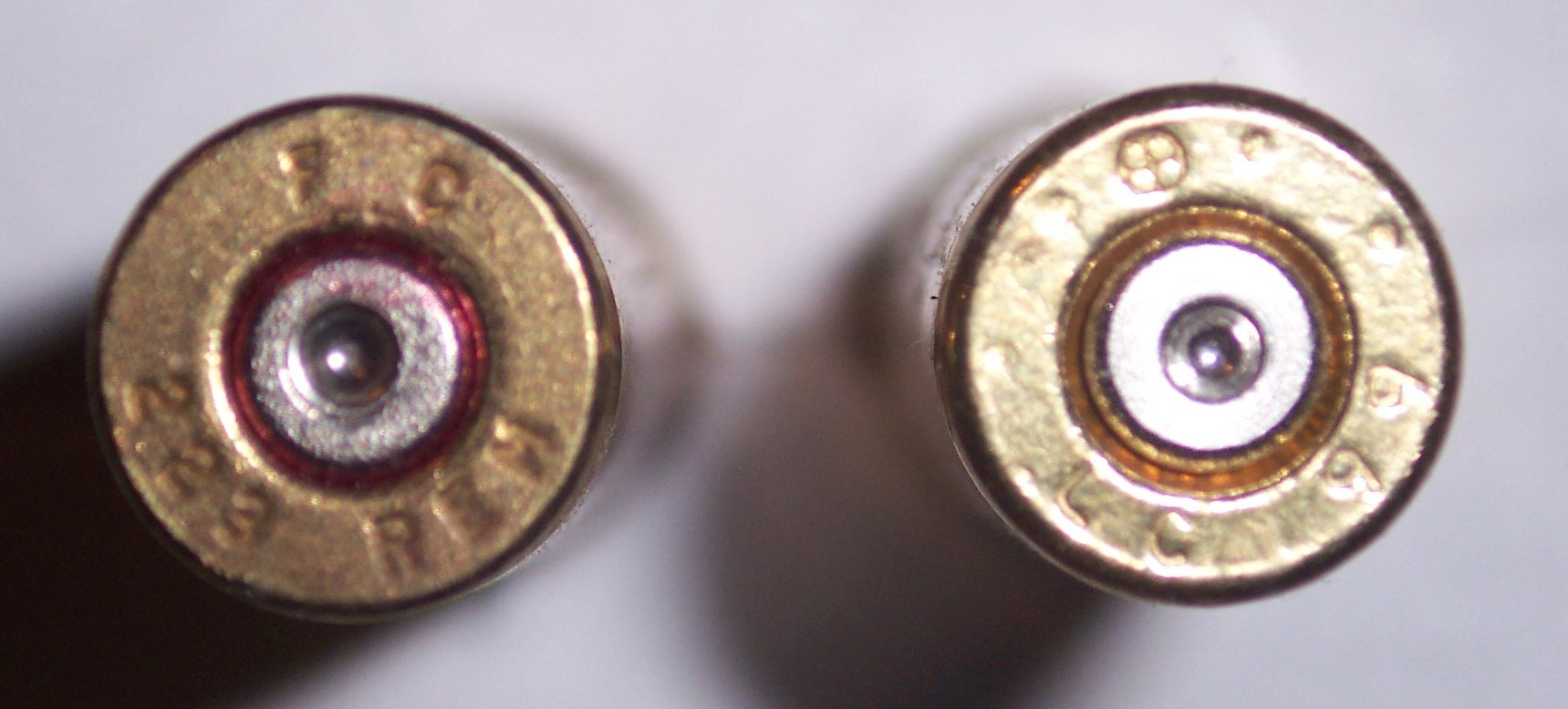
The left cartridge's headstamp says "FC 223 REM" which means that it was made by Federal Cartridge Co. and it is in the caliber .223 Remington. The cartridge on the right has a Two digits are the last two digits of the year of manufacture. They can be together as two digits or opposite each other (i.e., the tens digit at 9 o'clock and the ones digit at 3 o'clock). Early 20th-century cartridges may have additional digits or a letter indicating the month or yearly quarter of manufacture.

A letter, number, or alphanumeric code indicates the place of manufacture: Other codes may indicate metal suppliers (like France or The Netherlands) or the percentage of copper in the alloy the cartridge case is made of (like Poland and Germany).

== United States military cartridges ==
=== US arsenals ===
World War II manufactured cartridges with a single "4" as the year of production were made in 1944. The demand was so great for cartridges that most manufacturers just ground off the "3" on the "43" stamp to save time. Most wartime plants were closed by the end of the war. Some cartridges with a single "5" were made in 1955.

- AO or KS Allegheny Ordnance Plant (Kelly Springfield) (1943–1945) – Cumberland, Maryland; Operated by Kelly-Springfield Tire Co., a division of Goodyear Rubber. Conversion back to rubber tire production began in 1944.
- CB Curtis Bay Ordnance Depot (CBOD) (1917–1957) – Baltimore, Maryland. Used to store, examine, overhaul, and repack ammunition.
- DEN Denver Ordnance Plant (1941–1945) – Denver, Colorado: a division of Remington Arms.
- DM Iowa Army Ammunition Plant (January 1942 to July 1945) – Des Moines, Iowa: a division of US Rubber Co.
- EC Evansville Ordnance Plant (Chrysler) (June 1942 to April 1944) – Evansville, Indiana: a division of Chrysler-Plymouth. They manufactured brass-cased ammunition. From 1943 to 1944 it manufactured steel-cased .45 ACP ammunition.
- ECS Evansville Ordnance Plant (Chrysler-Sunbeam) (1942–1944) – Evansville, Indiana: a division of Sunbeam Electric Manufacturing Company. Chrysler bought the plant to keep up with demand. It loaded cartridges made at the Evansville-Chrysler plant across town and then packed them in shipping crates for shipment. In November, 1943 it was the first plant to package ammo in vacuum-packed metal cans. In the Spring and Summer of 1944 it was employed in inspecting and repacking .45 ACP and .30 Carbine ammunition.
- EW Eau Claire Ordnance Plant (August 1942 to December 1943) – Eau Claire, Wisconsin a division of US Rubber Co.
- FA Frankford Arsenal (1816–1977) – Philadelphia .
- HAW Hawthorne Naval Ammunition Depot (1926–1977) – Hawthorne, Nevada, USA.
- HW- Hawthorne Army Ammunition Plant (1977–present) – Hawthorne Nevada, USA. From 1977 to 1992 it was designated the Hawthorne Army Ammunition Plant (HWAAP) and from 1992–present it was redesignated the Hawthorne Army Ammunition Depot (HWAD).
- KOP Kingsbury Ordnance Plant (1941–1945; 1950–1959) – Kingsbury, Indiana.
- LC Lake City Ordnance Plant (operated by Winchester Arms) (1941–1945; 1951-Present) – Independence, Missouri; A sub-contractor originally owned by Remington Arms. It is currently owned by the US Government and operated by Northrop Grumman Innovative Systems.
- LM Lowell Ordnance Plant (1942–1943) – Lowell, Massachusetts
- LOD Letterkenny Ordnance Depot (1942–present) – Letterkenny, Franklin County, Pennsylvania. It was renamed Letterkenny Army Depot in August 1962.
- LOP Louisiana Army Ammunition Plant (1942–1996) – Doyline, Webster Parish, Louisiana, USA.
- LS Lone Star Army Ammunition Plant (1941–2009) – Texarkana, Texas, USA.
- M Milwaukee Ordnance Plant (August 1942 to December 1943) – Milwaukee, Wisconsin: Operated by US Rubber Co.
- P, PC, PCC Kings Mills Ordnance Plant (Peters Cartridge Company) (1942–1944) – Kings Mills, Ohio: A sub-contractor owned by Remington Arms from 1934 to March, 1944. It was converted to only produce .30 Carbine ammunition in 1943 and produced more than Lake City by 1944. It was closed down in March, 1944 to consolidate production at more centrally located plants. The site was converted to press vinyl 78 rpm records for Columbia Records from 1944 to 1949. It was then used for storage from 1949 to 1968.
- PBA Pine Bluff Arsenal (1941–present) – Pine Bluff, Arkansas, USA.
- ROP Redstone Ordnance Plant – Huntsville, Alabama (1941–1949). Combined with the Huntsville Depot facility to form Redstone Arsenal in 1949.
- SL St. Louis Ordnance Plant (November 1941 to June 1945) (May 1951 -May 1954) Plant mothballed December 1969 – St. Louis, Missouri.
- SND Seneca Ordnance Depot (1941 - 1990s) - Seneca, NY.
- TW Twin Cities Ordnance Plant (1942–1945; 1950–1957; 1965–1976; 2002–2005) – Minneapolis.
- U or UT Utah Ordnance Plant (March 1942 to December 1943) – Salt Lake City; a division of Remington Arms.

=== Civilian contractors ===
- B.E.L.L. or BeLL Brass Extrusion Labs LTD - Bensenville, Illinois (1973-1989). Manufactured rare and obsolete hunting cartridges for Midway, Holland & Holland, Purdey, John Rigby & Co., and Westley-Richards. Made 9x51mm Mk217 SMAW tracer cartridges for the USMC and 7.62x39mm Ball cartridges for the US Army. Bought out by El Dorado Cartridge Corporation in 1988 and closed in 1989.
- FC or FCC Federal Cartridge Corporation (1917-?) – Anoka, Minnesota
- NC National Brass & Copper Tube Co. (1917–1918) – Hastings-on-Hudson, New York. Manufactured .303 British ammunition during World War I.
- OMF Saint Marks Powder Co. (A division of Olin-Mathieson) – Saint Marks, Crawfordville, Florida. Made ball powder for their ammunition factories. It was sold off to General Dynamics in 1998.
- RA Remington Arms Company – Bridgeport, Connecticut
- RA H Remington Arms Company – Hoboken, New Jersey.
- RHA Co. Robin Hood Ammunition Company (1898-1915; 1915–1917?) – Swanton, Vermont. Founded in 1898 by Vermont governor Edward Curtis Smith along with Canadian investors as the Robin Hood Powder Company. It was originally located in a factory near the Missisquoi River but was later moved to Swanton in 1909 due to its location near railroad lines. Bought out by Remington in 1915 (becoming Remington-UMC Swanton but retaining the old headstamp) when it received a wartime contract to produce rifle ammunition for the French government. The French-style headstamp has the yearly quarter before the 4-digit year (e.g., 4-1917 would mean 4th Quarter (October, November and December), 1917). It employed 1,000 workers in three around-the-clock shifts. They either lived in Swanton or commuted by streetcar from nearby St.Albans. Remington closed the plant at the end of the war when the French contract was ended.
- US, USCCO United States Cartridge Company (1867–1936?) – Lowell, Massachusetts. Manufactured .303 British ammunition during World War I. Bought out by National Lead Company in 1911. Western Cartridge Company closed the Lowell plant in 1927 and moved its machinery to East Alton, Illinois. Western Cartridge would make the ammo and US Cartridge would distribute it under their brandname.
- SMC Symington Manufacturing Company - Headquarters at Baltimore, Maryland and production at Rochester, New York. One of its peacetime products was machinery for making autocannon and artillery shells. It made autocannon rounds.
- TZ Texas Foundries Inc. (1976–2009) – Lufkin, Texas.
- W, WC, or WCC Western Cartridge Company – East Alton, Illinois Manufactured .30-'06 Springfield ammunition during World War I and World War II.
- WMA Winchester Military Ammunition (Winchester Arms Co.)
- WRA Winchester Repeating Arms Company (a division of Western Cartridge Company) – New Haven, Connecticut. Manufactured .30-'06 Springfield and .303 British ammunition during World Wars I and II and .30 Carbine and .45 ACP ammunition during World War II.

=== Commercial cartridges ===
The US military used commercial cartridges for its training rifles, non-standard weapons, and shotguns. These usually had different headstamps than the military ammunition (usually their civilian one) and were shipped in commercial crates rather than military packaging.

- ♦ Western Cartridge Company – East Alton, Illinois:
- F Federal Cartridge Corporation – Anoka, Minnesota
- H Winchester Repeating Arms Company – New Haven, Connecticut:
- P, PCCo or PETERS Peters Cartridge Company – Kings Mills, Ohio:
- R-P Remington-Peters – Lonoke, Arkansas (1970–present). Lonoke facility only produced centerfire ammo from 1970; took over rimfire production from Bridgeport in 1989.
- R--P Remington Peters – Bridgeport, Connecticut (1960–1989). Bridgeport facility only produced rimfire ammo from 1970, then finally closed down in 1989.
- REM-UMC Remington-Union Metallic Cartridge – Bridgeport, Connecticut (1911–1960). Renamed Remington-Peters in 1960.
- U Union Metallic Cartridge Company – Bridgeport, Connecticut (1873–1911): Merged with Remington Arms in 1911, but still used the "U" headstamp for shotgun shells and rimfire cartridges.
- U.S.C.Co. United States Cartridge Company – Lowell, Massachusetts (1867–1926).
- WRA CO Winchester Repeating Arms Company – New Haven, Connecticut

=== Competition-grade military cartridges ===
Ammunition designed for military competitive shooting was made by a variety of manufacturers.

- MATCH Ammunition used for target shooting. It is also used by Designated Marksmen and Snipers because it is more accurate than regular rifle ammunition at long ranges.
- NM National Match. Match ammunition specially made for the Camp Perry National Rifle and Pistol shooting matches.

=== Special cartridges ===
==== 7.92mm Mauser ====
During World War II the Western Cartridge Company made 7.92mm Mauser ammunition for the Chinese Nationalists. The original Ball bullets made in 1942 had Gilding-Metal-clad jackets and the later Alternate Ball versions made from 1943 to 1944 had Gilding-Metal-Coated-Steel (GMCS) jackets. The Chinese numbers 七 (Qi, or "7") over 九 (Jiǔ, or "9") at the 9 o'clock position represent the bullet's caliber (7.9mm). The Chinese character 美 (Měi, or "Beautiful") at the 3 o'clock position is shorthand for 美国 (Měi-guó, "Beautiful Country"). (This was the term Chinese immigrants gave California in the 19th century – and, by extension, the United States). The 2-digit year of production (42, 43 or 44) is at the 6 o'clock position. The ammunition was bulk-packed in standard 20-round cartons without stripper clips to maximize the amounts delivered and the packaging was marked in the Chinese language. In 1944 there was a contract to make 30-million modified Springfield-type Mauser-compatible stripper clips which were bulk-packed in ammo cans. Due to the long transport times, the rough and mountainous terrain, and constantly changing battlelines, the order wasn't completely delivered until 1947.

==== .30 Caliber (.30-06 Springfield) ====
In 1953, US Army Intelligence ordered 250 million rounds of .30-06 ammunition to be manufactured in large lots under unique arsenal headstamps. The case had red lacquer sealant around the primer annulus. The headstamp has a two-letter manufacturer code (10- and 2-o'clock) and the lot code (rather than the year) is the number 40 (at 4 o'clock) followed by a third numeral (at 8 o'clock). This was divided by radial segment lines, like that of a Square (or Hellenic) Cross, between the portions to look like they were of European manufacture. The cartridges were intended to be aid to anti-Communist insurgents and Allied forces equipped with US weapons. They were loaded in 5-round stripper clips in M1 bandoleers (holding 12 × 5-round clips in cardboard spacers, or 60 rounds each) packed in US Navy 20mm Mark 1 metal ammo chests (33 × 60-round bandoleers; or 1980 rounds each). The chests were painted Olive Drab Green with subdued black lettering.

- A | N | 40 | # | Twin Cities Ordnance Plant, Minneapolis, Minnesota. Loaded nine lots (headstamps 40|1 to 40|9) for a total of 91,000,720 rounds.
- B | N | 40 | # | St. Louis Ordnance Plant, St. Louis, Missouri. Loaded four lots (headstamps 40|1 to 40|4) for a total of 49,669,200 rounds. Empty sample cases for a fifth lot are known (headstamp 40|5), but it was never manufactured.
- C | N | 40 | # | Lake City Ordnance Plant, Independence, Missouri. Loaded nine lots (headstamps 40|1 to 40|9) for a total of 90,832,304 rounds (further broken down into 5 or 6 alphabetical sub-lots of about two million rounds each).

==== 7.62×39mm M43 Soviet ====
During the Vietnam War in the early 1970s (July, 1970 to January, 1972) the Lake City Ordnance Plant (contractor code: LC) and Frankfort Arsenal (contractor code: FA) produced unmarked Boxer-primed 7.62×39mm Blank and Ball cartridges for use by American and Allied personnel. The blanks were used by the "Tigerland" simulation exercise at Fort Polk, Louisiana. The ball ammunition allowed reconnaissance and Special Operations units to utilize captured Communist Bloc weapons like the SKS carbine and AKM assault rifle. Most ball ammunition went to support Marshal Lon Nol's Cambodian Army (1970–1975), which was receiving reconditioned SKS carbines and AK-47s as military aid.

The cartridges were based on a Lapua design. The bullets had Gilding Metal (GM) or Gilding Metal Coated Steel (GMCS) jackets and Gilding Metal-clad brass cases. Lake City cartridges had red sealant on the primer annulus and Frankfort Arsenal used purple sealant. They came in 20-round cartons that were marked with special short lot numbers that lacked the contractor code and date.

Afterwards Brass Extrusion Labs LTD (code: BEL) made batches of 7.62×39mm ammo from 1978? to 1988 for training soldiers in the familiarization and use of Communist Bloc weapons. They can be identified by the light-blue sealant used on the primer annulus.

== Commonwealth military cartridges ==
The number in parentheses is the nation's Nation Code.

=== Australia (66) ===
- A/|\F Small Arms Ammunition Factory No.1 – Footscray; Melbourne, Victoria; Australia (1888–1945) The broadshead arrowhead between the "A" and "F" was the Government Property mark.
- ADI Australian Defence Industries (1991–1993; 1994–present) – Footscray, Melbourne, Victoria, Australia (1991–1993) / Benalla, Melbourne, Victoria, Australia (1994–present). Moved from Footscray to Benalla in 1994. Became privatized as Thales Australia (a division of the French firm Thales Defense) in 2006.
- AFF Small Arms Ammunition Factory No.2 – Footscray; Melbourne, Victoria; Australia (1988–1994) Headstamp changed from MF to AFF in 1988, and changed to ADI in 1991.
- /|\F – Military Factory Footscray – Footscray; Melbourne; Australia (1888–1945). The broadshead arrowhead before the "F" was the Government Property mark.
- ICI-ANZ Imperial Chemical Industries of Australia & New Zealand (1928–1998) – An Australian subsidiary of the British chemical company Imperial Chemical Industries Ltd. Originally founded in 1928 as ICI (Australasia), it was changed to ICI (Australia and New Zealand) a year later. It owned an explosives factory at Deer Park, Victoria through ICI's original Nobel holdings. This provided explosives during World War II. ICIANZ became a publicly traded company by ICI (UK) in 1950 and was renamed ICI Australia Pty Ltd in 1971. ICI divested itself of ICI Australia in 1997, which later becomes Orica in 1998.
- MF Small Arms Ammunition Factory No.1 – Footscray; Melbourne; Australia (1888–1945) Plant finally closed in 1945.
- MG Small Arms Ammunition Factory No.2 – Footscray; Melbourne; Australia (1940–1948; 1949–1988) Headstamp changed to MF in 1949 and used until 1988.
- MH Small Arms Ammunition Factory No.3 – Hendon; Adelaide, South Australia; Australia (1940–1945)
- MJ Small Arms Ammunition Factory No.4 – Hendon; Adelaide, South Australia; Australia (1940–1945)
- MQ Small Arms Ammunition Factory No.5 – Rocklea; Brisbane; Australia (1942–1945)
- MW Small Arms Ammunition Factory No.6 – Welshpool, Western Australia; Australia (1942–1945)
- SAAF Small Arms Ammunition Factory – Footscray; Melbourne; Australia (1888–1945) Headstamp changed to MF in 1940.

=== Canada (20 and 21) ===
Arsenals

The "C"s in "DAC", "DCA", "LAC" and "VC" had a small broadshead arrowhead (/|\) inset to indicate it was Canadian Government Issue property. This mark was adopted by the Canadian government in 1867 upon its creation as a Dominion to replace the British government's broadshead arrow mark. The ammunition color code system used by Canada used the British system for .303 ammunition, the American system for .30-06 ammunition, and later the NATO system for all other ammunition.

- C-I-L or CIL Canadian Industries Ltd. (1955–1976). A corporation formed in 1910 from a merger of five Canadian explosives companies and their assets. It ran the Defence Industries Ltd. munitions plants from 1940 to 1946. It owned the Dominion (1955–1966), Imperial (?-1976), Monark, and Canuck commercial ammunition brands. It used the CIL headstamp on its cartridges from 1955 until 1976, when IVI bought out its commercial ammunition production.
- DA, DAC, or DAQ Dominion Arsenal Co. – Quebec City (1882–1958) – Quebec City, Quebec; Canada. Dominion Arsenal used the DAQ headstamp from 1914 to 1918, the DAC headstamp from 1919(?) until 1945, the DCA headstamp in 1935, the DA headstamp from 1945 to 1958, and the CIL headstamp from 1955 to 1976. From 1945 to 1986 Dominion Arsenal was under the control of a nationalised crown corporation called Canadian Arsenals Ltd that was controlled by the Department of Supply and Services. Canadian Arsenals Ltd. was privatised and bought by SNC-Lavalin in 1986.
- DI Defence Industries Ltd. (1940–1946) – Park Avenue, Brownsburg, Montreal, Canada. A division of Canadian Industries Ltd. formed in late 1939 to produce munitions for the projected war effort. In 1941 they began to make high-quality boxer-primed .303 "Red Label"-type ammunition for use in aircraft machineguns. In 1942 they made the first Canadian government-manufactured 9×19mm Parabellum cartridges for Commonwealth forces. They also made 7.92×57mm Mauser rifle ammunition for use in the British 7.92mm BESA machine gun and issue to European Resistance groups and the Nationalist and Communist Chinese.
- DIV Defence Industries Ltd. – Verdun (1940–1946) – Verdun, Quebec; Canada. A division of Canadian Industries Ltd. formed in 1939 to produce munitions for the war effort.
- IVI Industries Valcartier Inc. (1977–1991; 1989–present) – Saint-Gabriel-de-Valcartier, Quebec, Canada. In 1935, an ammunition manufacturing facility called Val-Rose was built on the grounds of the disused World War I-era Valcartier Military Camp. From 1945 to 1967 the facility was part of Canadian Arsenals Ltd. and specialized in small arms ammunition. It was privatized as Industrie Valcartier Incorporee in 1967. It bought out Imperial, CIL's commercial cartridge division, in 1976. It was acquired by SNC-Lavalin (SNC Tec) in 1980, which renamed it IVI Inc. The IVI plant in Valcartier ceased making commercial ammunition in 1988. IVI Inc. was later amalgamated into General Dynamics Ordnance and Tactical Systems – Canada Inc. in 1989. The Valcartier plant itself finally closed in 1991.
- LAC, DAL Dominion Arsenal – Lindsay (1914–1921) – Lindsay, Ontario; Canada. A division of Dominion Arsenal Co. formed in 1914 to expand munitions production for the war effort. It used the headstamp LAC ("Lindsay Arsenal, Canada") from 1914 to 1917 and DAL ("Dominion Arsenal – Lindsay") from 1918 to 1921.
- TR Three Rivers plant (1940–1945) – Trois-Rivières, Quebec; Canada. A division of Dominion Rubber & Munitions.
- VC Canadian Industries Limited – Verdun (Verdun Arsenal) (1939–1945) – Verdun, Montreal, Quebec, Canada

Civilian Contractors

- RR Co Ross Rifle Co. (1914–1919) – Verdun, Quebec; Canada.

Commercial Manufacturers

- DCCO, DOMINION Dominion Cartridge Co. Ltd. (1886–1955) – Brownsburg, Argenteuil, Quebec, Canada. A division of Dominion Arsenal that produced ammunition for the civilian market from 1911 to 1955. It was made part of Canadian Industries Ltd. (CIL) in 1928. During World War II it made military ammunition for CIL under the DCCO headstamp. It changed its headstamp to DOMINION in 1947 and to CIL in 1955, but was still sold under the Dominion brand. It was sold to IVI in 1966.
- IMPERIAL A commercial brand of ammunition manufactured by Canadian Industries Ltd. (CIL); it later used the headstamp CIL-Imperial from 1954 to 1976. It was bought out by IVI Inc. in 1976, restarted production in 1977, and ceased production in 1991(?).

=== New Zealand (98) ===
- CAC Colonial Ammunition Company – Auckland, New Zealand. (1890–1920)

=== South Africa (18) ===
- M M Musgrave Manufacturers and Distributors (Pty) Ltd. (1933–1996; 1940?-1945?) – Bloemfontein, South Africa. Safari rifle manufacturer who manufactured "wildcat" .303 British hunting cartridges. They manufactured military cartridges (9×19mm Parabellum and 7.92×57mm Mauser) during the war from 1940? to 1945?. Headstamp is the letter "M" at 9 o'clock and 3 o'clock facing the primer annulus and the caliber at 12 o'clock and 6 o'clock facing the rim. Musgrave went out of business in 1996. Its rifle shop was bought out by Vektor and its ammunition production was bought out by Pretoria Metal Pressings (PMP).
- SAM South African Mint (1961–1965) – Pretoria, South Africa. Later became Pretoria Metal Pressing LTD.
- U (1937–1961) – Pretoria Branch Mint – Pretoria, South Africa. Converted to ammunition production in 1937. Later became South African Mint (SAM) in 1961.
- U <> (1939–1961) – Kimberley Branch Mint – Kimberley, South Africa.

=== United Kingdom (99) ===
/|\ = UK Government Property. Formerly the badge of the Sidney family, the broad arrow (or "Devil's Claws") symbol was appropriated by the British government to indicate the item was government issue.
FF = Filling Factory.
GCF = Government Cartridge Factory (1918–1919).
ROF = Royal Ordnance Factory.
SAA = Small Arms Ammunition Factory (1940–1946).

- /|\ (used 1940–1941) – ROF Radway Green SAA (ROF 13). After 1941 the use of the broad arrow was dropped and switched to the letters "RG".
- /|\ /|\ (used 1940–1941) – ROF Spennymoor SAA (ROF 21). After 1941 the use of the 2 broad arrows was dropped and switched to the letters "SR".
- /|\ /|\ /|\ (used 1940–1941) – ROF Steeton SAA. After 1941 the use of the 3 broad arrows was dropped and switched to the letters "ST".
- B, BE, E, & BPF (1940–1946) – Royal Ordnance Factory Blackpole SAA (ROF 20), Blackpole, Worcester, Worcestershire, UK. This Cadbury Bros. Ltd. factory was temporarily converted into an ordnance plant for the war effort.
- G18F1, C18F1 (1918) – Government Cartridge Factory No.1 (production overseen by Birmingham Metal and Munitions Co.) – Blackheath, Staffordshire. The digits "18" are the last two digits of the year of production.
- G##F3, C##F3 (1918–1919) – Government Cartridge Factory No.3 (production overseen by Kings Norton Metal Co.) – Blackpole, Worcestershire. The ## are the last two digits of the year of production.
- HN (1942–1945) – ROF Hirwaun, Hirwaun, Rhondda Cynon Taf, South Wales, UK.
- RG (1940–present) Royal Ordnance Factory Radway Green – Radway Green, Cheshire; England, United Kingdom.
- R^L Royal Laboratory (1696–1965). – Woolwich, Greenwich, London, United Kingdom.
- RNADC Royal Naval Armaments Depot, Caerwent, Wales, United Kingdom.
- ST Royal Ordnance Factory Steeton, Steeton, West Yorkshire
- SWN Royal Ordnance Factory Swynnerton. Swynnerton, Staffordshire, United Kingdom.
- TH – ROF Thorp Arch, Thorp Arch, West Yorkshire, England, UK
- ASL Aerator Systems Ltd. (?-1918) – Sutton, South London, London, UK. Made 8mm Lebel cartridge cases for France during World War I.
- BBC – Barking Brassware Co. Barking, Essex, UK
- BMARC, BMARCo – British Manufacturing and Research Company, Grantham, Lincolnshire.
- BMM Birmingham Metals and Munitions Co. – Birmingham, UK. Made 8mm Lebel cartridges for France during World War I.
- C & H Curtis & Harvey Ltd. (1820–1942) – Houndslow, Scottish Borders, Great Britain. Made black-powder for the Snider and Martini-Henry and smokeless powder for the Lee-Enfield. Manufactured high-quality "fast-burning" black-powder and black powder cartridges until 1973, when it ran out of the specialized charcoal to produce it. Had its head office in London and its factory in Hounslow, later acquiring powdermills in Bedfont, North Feltham, and Tonbridge. It was later acquired by Explosive Trades Ltd. in 1918 (later diversified into Nobel Industries in 1920), which was later made a component of Imperial Chemical Industries when it was formed in 1926. It was reorganized as part of the ICI (Explosives) division in 1932 and merged into ICI in 1942, but survived as an ICI brand until the factory closed in 1973.
- C-P Crompton Parkinson Co. Ltd, Doncaster, Yorkshire, U.K.
- E, EB Eley Brothers (1866–present) – Edmonton, London, UK.
- GB Greenwood and Batley – Leeds, Yorkshire, UK.
- GKB (1884? – ?) – George Kynock & Co. of Birmingham (later Kynoch Ltd. in 1896). Made percussion caps from 1862 and metallic cartridges from 1884.
- H – Hall Telegraph Co.
- K Kynoch Factories, Imperial Chemical Industries Ltd. – Birmingham, UK.
  - K – Kynoch & Co, Witton, Birmingham, UK.
  - K2 (1943–1944) – I.C.I. (Kynoch), Standish, Greater Manchester, Lancashire, UK
  - K3 – There was no Kynoch factory designated K3.
  - K4 (1942–1944) – I.C.I. (Kynoch), Yeading, Middlesex, UK.
  - K5 (1944) – I.C.I. (Kynoch), Kidderminster, Worcestershire, UK.
- KN – Kings Norton Metal Company – Kings Norton, Birmingham, Worcestershire, UK.
- P&S – Platers & Stampers Ltd. (1936–1959) – Burnley, Lancashire.
- RC, RCC, & RH (1941–1945) – Raleigh Cycle Co., Carlton, Nottingham.

== NATO manufacturers ==
The number in parentheses is the nation's Nation Code.

=== Austria (41) ===
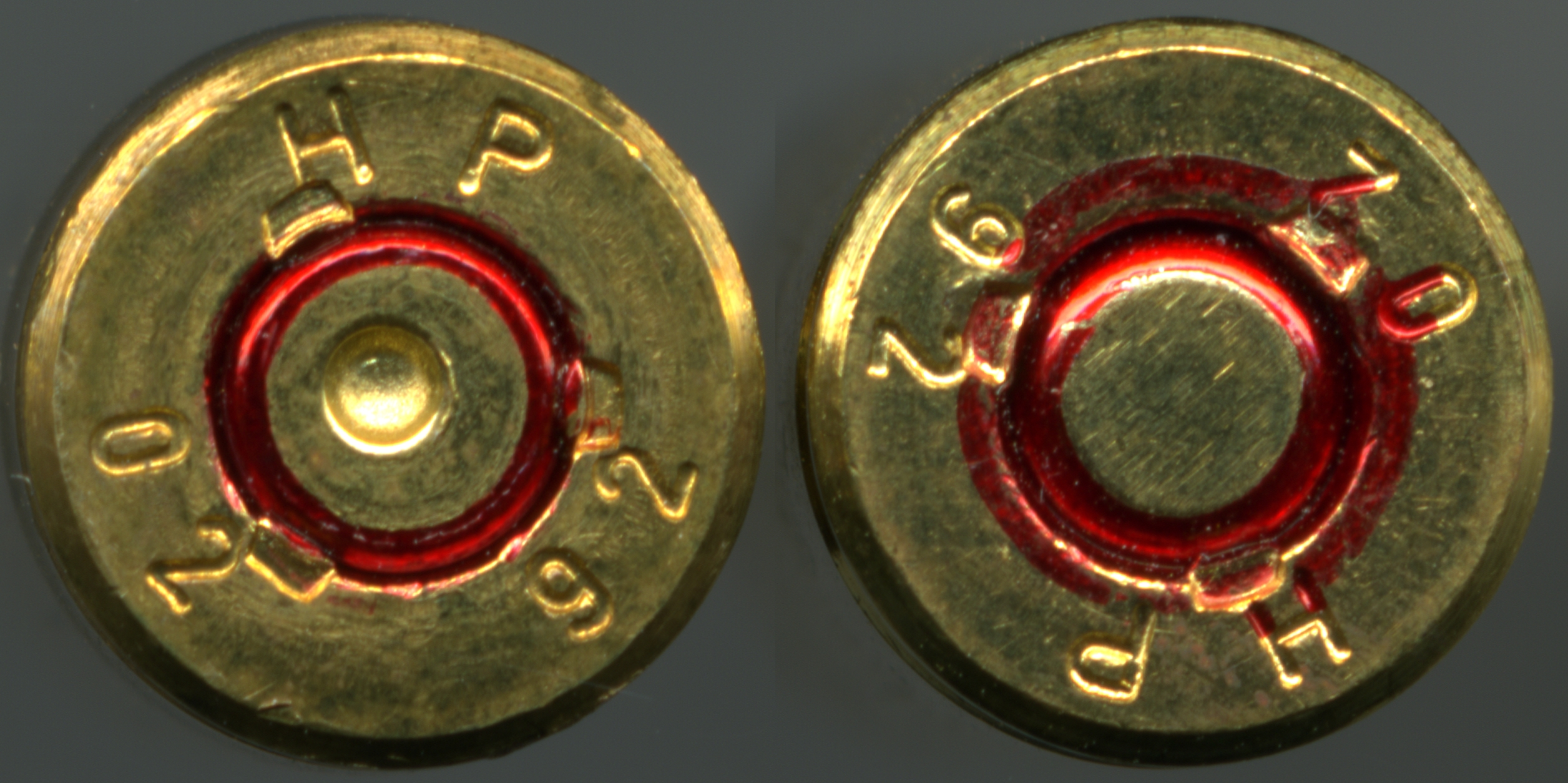
Two cartridge cases with the „HP“ headstamp for the Hirtenberger Patronen-, Zündhütchen-und Metallwarenfabrik A.-G.

- * * Hirtenberger Patronenfabrik ("Hirtenberg Cartridge Manufacturer") – Hirtenberg, Baden bei Wien, Lower Austria, Austria. "Clean" export headstamp used by Hirtenberger – with the stars at 3 o'clock and 6 o'clock, the 2-digit year at 12 o'clock, and the caliber at 6 o'clock. The marks are either two 5-point stars, two 6-point asterisks, or a 5-point star and a 6-point asterisk.
- B Wöllersdorfer Werke Berndorf – Berndorf, Bezirk Baden, Lower Austria, Austria.
- GR Georg Roth AG – Lichtenwörth, Austria. Headstamp is a cypher of G & R combined. Many of its foreign holdings were seized and nationalized after World War I. Absorbed by Hirtenberger Patronenfabrik in the 1930s.
- H or HP Hirtenberger Patronen-, Zündhütchen-und Metallwarenfabrik A.-G. ("Hirtenberger Cartridge, Primer and Metalwares Manufacturer") (1860–1938; 1957–2004) – Hirtenberg, Baden bei Wien, Lower Austria, Austria. Originally a metalware and cartridge factory, it eventually concentrated on cartridge-making. In 2004 it closed down its cartridge production lines and now focuses exclusively on making mortar shells.
- KC or K&C Keller & Co – Hirtenberg, Baden bei Wien, Lower Austria, Austria.
- MfW K.u.K Munitions fabrik Wollersdorf (1895-1920; 1924-1939?) - Wöllersdorf, Bezirk Wiener Neustadt-Land, Lower Austria, Austria. Imperial Austrian munitions factory that controlled plants in Berndorf, Hirtenberg, Enzesfeld, Blumau and Theresienfeld. Was made part of the Staatlichen Industriewerke ("State Industrial Works") in 1919. Completely destroyed in a fire in 1920 and wasn't operational until 1924. From 1933 to 1938 political prisoners were kept at a concentration camp on the grounds; ironically, some were Nazis. It was taken over by Hirtenberg in 1938 after the Anschluss.
- ÖJP Österreichische Jagdpatronenfabrik ("Austrian Hunting Cartridge Factory") (1948 – ?) – Kramsach, Tirol, Austria. Founded in 1948, taken over by Hirtenberger in 1964.

German P-Codes (1938–1940) – Operated under German occupation

- P.635 Otto Eberhardt Patronenfabrik (1938?-1945) – Hirtenberg, Niederdonau, Austria. Formerly Hirtenberger Patronen-, Zündhütchen- und Metallwaren-fabrik A.-G. until taken over after the Anschluss in 1938.

=== Belgium (13) ===
- AEP Anciens Ètablissements Pieper ("Pieper's Old/Former Establishments") (1905–1950) – Herstal, Belgium. Contracted with Fabrique Nationale and other manufacturers to make ammunition under their headstamp.
- FN or FNB, Fabrique Nationale d'Armes de Guerre (FN) – Bruges, Belgium.
- JA Jules Ancion & Cie – Liège, Belgium.
- P Fabrique Nationale d'Armes de Guerre (FN) – Herstal, Belgium.
- PB (Poudrerie Belge de Clermont > Belgian Powdermill of Clermont) (1990-Present) – Rue Clermont, Clermont-sous-Huy, Engis, Belgium. Powder mill that provides propellants for both French and Belgian manufacturers. Currently owned by SNPE group. Formerly Poudreries Réunies de Belgique ("Reunified Powdermills of Belgium") from 1969 to 1989.

=== Bosnia-Herzegovina (75) ===
- ИК, IK Igman zavod ad Konjic ("Igman Factory at Konjic") – Konjic, Bosnia. Named for the nearby Igman plateau.

=== Czech Republic (16) ===
- bxn Sellier & Bellot – Vlasim, Czech Republic.

=== Denmark (22) ===
Danish headstamps have the Danish Crown at 12 o'clock, the year of production split between 9- and 3-o'clock (thousands and hundreds place at 9 and tens and ones at 3), and the manufacturer code at 6 o'clock. Reloaded cartridges overstamp a triangle at the 6 o'clock position. From 1968 to 2007 ammunition packaging was stamped or embossed with the letters HMAK ensigned by a crown – standing for Hærens Materielkommando (Army Materiel Command)

- AMA Ammunitionsarsenalet ("Ammunition Arsenal") (1676–?) – Copenhagen, Denmark.
- HA Hærens ammunitionsarsenalet ("Army Arsenal") (?-?) –
- HL Hærens Krudt et Patroner Laboratoriesværks ("Army Powder & Cartridges Laboratory Works") (1900–1937) – Copenhagen, Denmark.

=== Egypt (36) ===
Egypt uses Arabic-language letters and numerals in its headstamp – letters and numerals are read from right to left and dates and numbers are read from left to right. (Arabic-language numerals are different from the Western "Arabic" numerals (i.e., 1, 2, 3, etc.) – also, Arabs refer to their counting system as the "Indian" numerals). At 12 o'clock is the three-letter acronym for Gomhoreyyet Maṣr el-ʿArabeyya (جمهورية مصر العربية, "Arab Republic of Egypt") – which looks like the English letters ERC in cursive from left to right but represent the Egyptian Arabic letters GMA from right to left. At 4 o'clock is the two-digit Arsenal Number and at 8 o'clock is the two-digit year. The metric designation for a cartridge on the headstamp is written in reverse with the length first, followed by the bore (i.e., 7.62×54mmR M91 Russian is written as 54 × 7.62).

- ٠١ (GMA 01) Military Factory 10 ( Abu-Kir Company for Engineering Industries) – Abu Qir, Alexandria, Egypt.
- ٧٢ (GMA 72) Military Factory 27 (Shubra Company for Engineering Industries) (1953–present) – Shubra district, Cairo, Egypt.

=== Finland (58) ===
- LAPUA Lapuan Patruunatehdas ("Cartridge Factory at Lapua") (1949–1998) – Lapua, Finland. It is now called Nammo Lapua (1998–present), a division of the Nammo Group.
- SAT, SAKO SAKO A.B. (Suojeluskuntain Ase-ja Konepaja Oy, "Civil Guard Weapon- and Machining-works Ltd.") (1921–present)- Riihimäki, Finland. It was originally founded by the Civil Guard in 1919 to recondition and rebuild surplus Russian service weapons, but became independent in 1921. It was later acquired by Beretta Holding Group in 2000.
- T Oy Tikkakoski A.B. (aka TIKKA) – Jyväskylä, Central Finland, Finland. Manufactured arms and various consumer goods, like sewing machines. Tikkakoski Arsenal was its arms division, the only privately owned weapons manufacturer in the country, and operated from 1930 to 1947. It was seized by the Russians as war reparations from 1947 to 1957 and demilitarized to produce consumer goods. Private investors bought it back and ran it from 1957 to 1983. The company was bought out by SAKO in 1983. SAKO (and through them, the TIKKA hunting rifle brand) was later acquired by Beretta in 2000.
- VPT Valtion Patruunatehdas ("State Cartridge Factory") (1923–1949) – Lapua, Finland. The forerunner to Lapua. In 1949 it was absorbed by Valmet and renamed LAPUA.
- VRT Vihtavuori Ruutitehdas: “State Powdermill.” Jyväskylä, Lakeland District (Finnish: Järvi-Suomi). [1921-Present].

=== France (14) ===
Notes:

Early French headstamps mark the bullet type at 12 o'clock (eg., ART.M), the 1-digit Quarter of production at 9 o'clock, and the 2-digit Year of production at 3 o'clock. The codes for the manufacturer (e.g. A.RS) and metal producer (e.g. S) are conjoined at 6 o'clock (i.e, A.RS.S).
Later French headstamps mark the 1-digit Quarter of the year of production and 2-digit Year at the 12-o'clock position (e.g. Q-YY), the letter code for the metal supplier for the case at the 3-o'clock position, the cartridge caliber and model at the 6-o'clock position, and the manufacturer at the 9-o'clock position. They are oriented so that the 12 o'clock and 6 o'clock sides are at right angles to the 9 o'clock and 3 o'clock sides.

- ART. Direction de l'Artillerie ("Management of the Artillery") (?-1918) – The French state body under the ministère de Guerre ("Ministry of War") that oversaw the manufacturing of artillery pieces and munitions before the creation of the Service de l'Équipement ("Equipment Service"). It was a prefix to the cartridge designation at the 12 o'clock position used on early French-made military cartridges.
  - ART.M stands for 8mm Lebel Balle M (manufactured 1886–1898). Colonial arsenals manufactured the cartridge after 1898 for Colonial forces equipped with earlier-pattern rifles.
  - ART.D stands for 8mm Lebel Balle D (manufactured 1898–1932).
- A.A. Amorçage Anglais ("English Primers") (1915?-1918) – A suffix on the cartridge designation at the 12 o'clock position used on British-made cartridges during World War I. British primers were of a different type than the French models, lacking a cover over the annulus.

Manufacturers

- ABS Atelier de Construction de Bourges ("Manufacturing Workshops of Bourges") – Bourges, Cher, Centre, France.
- ADI Cartoucherie de Douai (Cartridge Factory of Douai) - Douai, Hauts-de-France, France.
- ALM Ateliers Legueu de Meaux (Legueu Workshops of Meaux) – Meaux, France. Manufactured cartridge-cases and bullets.
- AMN Atelier de Chargement de Montluçon (Loading Workshop of Montluc) – Montluçon, France.
- APX Atelier de Construction de Puteaux (Manufacturing Workshop of Puteaux) – Puteaux, France.
- A.RS, RS Atelier de Construction de Rennes (Manufacturing Workshop of Rennes) – Rennes, France.
- A.TE, TE Atelier de Fabrication de Toulouse (Manufacturing Workshop of Toulouse) – Toulouse, France.
- A.TS, TS Atelier de Construction de Tarbes (Manufacturing Workshop of Tarbes) – Tarbes, France.
- A.VE, VE Cartoucherie de Valence (Cartridge Factory of Valence) (1874–1964) – town of Bourg-lès-Valence, municipality of Valence, department of Drôme, region of Auvergne-Rhône-Alpes, France.
- A.VS, VS Atelier de Fabrication de Vincennes (Manufacturing Workshop of Vincennes) Vincennes, France.
- CN Ateliers Mécaniques de Normandie (Mechanical Workshops of Normandy).
- CP Cartoucherie Leon Paulet à Marseille – Marseille, Bouches-du-Rhône, France.
- DTE ? – Unknown.
- ECP Ecole Centrale de Pyrotechnie (Central School of Pyrotechnics) Bourges, France.
- F Cartoucherie Française ("Cartridge Factory of France") – Survilliers, department of Val-d'Oise, region of Île-de-France, France. Starting as a small ammo-production firm with a dozen workers, government contracts during World War I (1914–1918) to produce military cartridges, rockets and shells caused it to grow to 332 employees. The interwar years (1919–1939) were prosperous, but the cartridge production line was shut down during the German Occupation (1940–1945). Production resumed in the mid 1940s, but munitions production was stopped in the late 1980s due to a cancelling of government contracts.
- G Gévelot S. A. (Société Française des Munitions de Issy-les-Moulineaux) (1820–1950; 1950–1980) – Paris, France. Firm founded in Paris by Marin Gévelot in 1820. Initially set up to manufacture swords, they began making percussion caps from 1823. Merged with Gaupillat & Cie in 1883 to become Société Française des Munitions in 1884. Took the name of Gévelot S.A. in 1950.
- LM Cartoucherie du Mans (Cartridge Factory of Le Mans) Le Mans, France.
- MGM Manufacture Générale de Munitions ("General Ammunition Factory") (1930–1978) – Bourg-les-Valence and Clérieux, France. Bought out by Gevelot S.A. in 1974 and integrated into Société Française des Munitions in 1978. The Bourg-les-Valence site is closed and the Clérieux site is run by Cheddite France.
- MI, SM Robert Paulet & Cie (Société Méridionale d'Industrie > "Meridian Industrial Association") – Marseille, France. Formerly Cartoucherie Leon Paulet à Marseille.
- MR Manufacture de Machines du Haut-Rhin ("Machine-Building Factory of the Upper Rhine", or MANURHIN) (?-1990) – Mulhouse–Bourtzwiller, Haut-Rhin, Grand Est (formerly Alsace), France. Manufactured cartridges as well as the industrial machinery to make bullets and casings and load cartridges. Bought out and merged with GIAT in 1990.
- PB (Poudrerie Belge de Clermont) – Rue de Clermont, Engis, Belgium.
- RY Établissements Rey Frères ("Rey Brothers Enterprises") – Nîmes, France.
- SF, SFM Société Française de Munitions de Issy-les-Moulineaux ("French Association for Munitions of Issy-les-Moulineaux") (1820-?; 1950-?) – Issy les Moulineaux, France. Firm founded in Paris by Marin Gévelot in 1820. Merged with Gaupillat & Cie in 1883 to become Société Française des Munitions in 1884. Took the name of Gévelot S.A. in 1950. If the headstamp has five-pointed stars at the 9 o'clock and 3 o'clock positions, it is commercial sales or export contract ammunition.
- TH Cartoucherie de la Seine ("Cartridge Factory of the Seine") – Le Havre, France. A division of Tréfileries du Havre à Rugles ("Wire-Drawing Works of Le Havre and Rugles").

Metal Suppliers

- BS Atelier de laminage de l'Ecole de Pyrotechnie de Bourges ("Rolling Mill Workshop of the Pyrotechnics School of Bourges") – Bourges, France.
- C Compagnie française des métaux ("French Metals Company") – Castelsarrazin, Tarn-et-Garonne, Midi-Pyrénées, France. A metal-supplier for Atelier de Fabrication de Toulouse.
- D Société Electro-métallurgie de Dives (Electro-plating Association of Dives") – Dives, France. Formerly Compagnie du Duralin de Dives.
- F Tréfileries et Laminoirs de la Méditerranée à St-Louis. ("Wire-Drawing Works and Rolling Mills of the Mediterranean of St. Louis") (1957–present) – Île Saint-Louis, Paris, Hauts-de-Seine, Île-de-France, France. A metal-supplier for Cartoucherie Leon Paulet de Marseilles.
- I Société de Métallurgie Franco-Belge de Issy-les-Moulineaux ("Franco-Belgian Metallurgic Society of Issy-les-Molineaux") (1895–Present) – Issy-les-Moulineaux, France. A Belgian company that supplied metal stock for Société Française de Munitions de Issy-les-Moulineaux.
- P S.A. Des Mines et Fonderies de Pontgibaud (?-1897) – Pontgibaud, Puy-de-Dôme department, Auvergne region, France. Manufactured bullets and cartridge-cases. It went out of business in 1897 when the local lead deposits played out.
- P Société Française des Métaux à Couéran (1901–1961) – Originally founded as the Laveissière company in 1859, but was refounded and renamed in 1901. In 1961 it was merged with Tréfileries et laminoirs du Havre to form Tréfimétaux. In 1967 Tréfimétaux came under the control of Péchiney, who later sold the company to the Italian group SMI SpA (Società Metallurgica Italiana) in 1987.
- R Trefilerie et Laminoirs du Havre à Rugles (Usine de Rugles) ("Wire-Drawing Works and Rolling Mills of La Havre and Rugles (Factory at Rugles)") – Rugles, Normandy, France. Made bullets and cartridge-cases for Cartoucherie de la Seine.
- S Compagnie Française des Métaux ("French Metals Company") – Sérifontaine, Oise, France. A metal-supplier for Tréfileries du Havre à Rugles.

French Colonial Arsenals

- A.AR, AR Cartoucherie d'Alger ("Cartridge Plant of Algiers") – Algiers, Algeria.
- CV Cartoucherie Voltaïque ("Cartridge Plant of the Volta") – Ouagadougou, Haute-Volta (later Republic of Upper Volta [1958–1984], modern-day Burkina Faso [1984–present]).
- EID Établissements Industriels de la Défense ("Defense Industry Establishments") – Damascus, Syria; Mandat Français pour la Syrie et le Liban ("French Mandate of Syria and the Levant") Uses Arabic letters and numbers on the headstamp since independence as the Syrian Republic. Post-colonial headstamp has the Arabic word for Syria (سورية, or Sūrya) at 12 o'clock, metric caliber at 3 o'clock, contractor code (م .م. د, MMD for مؤسسة معامل الدفاع Muasasat Meaml aldifae, or "Defense Industries Corporation") at 6 o'clock, and two-digit year of production at 9 o'clock.

=== Germany (12) ===
(?-1919)

All loading, assembly and packing of ammunition took place at Spandau Arsenal. Peacetime headstamps had the 2-digit year of production at 3 o'clock, month of production at 9 o'clock, and content case manufacturer (S for Spandau or P for Polte) at 6 o'clock. Wartime headstamps had the 2-digit year of production at 12 o'clock, case type (S67 = Brass made with 67% copper) at 3 o'clock, content case manufacturer at 6 o'clock, and the batch number at 9 o'clock.

The carton label had three lines of text. The first line would be made up of the bullet type, cartridge assembly and packing facility (Mf. for Spandau's Munitionsfabrik), followed by the date of assembly (in the format MM.DD.YY; 2-digit Month, the Day, and 2-digit Year). The second line concerned the propellant manufacturer (P. for Spandau's Pulverfabrik or Tr. for the powdermill at Troisdorf). The third line listed the model of primer (Zdh, or zundhuetchen), the date of manufacture, and the manufacturer; an "X" between the primer type and date of manufacture indicated it was a type of primer with a low mercury content.

- C Munitionsfabrik Cassel ("Ammunition Factory at Kassel") – Kassel, Hesse-Nassau, Germany. Closed after the war. Old wartime-manufactured batches of catridges were still being loaded in the early 1920s by German cartridge-manufacturers who bought up the remaining stock. (They had a declaration on the label that attested that they were old production, to prevent accusations they circumvented the Versailles Treaty).
- S Kaiserlich Munitionsfabrik ("Imperial [Prussian] Munitions Factory") (1722–1919) – Spandau Arsenal, Spandau, Berlin, Germany. Manufactured 7.92mm Mauser ammunition. It was decommissioned in 1919 and was no longer allowed to manufacture war materiel. Gustav Genschow & Co. (GECO) bought the facility in 1924 and used it to make .22-caliber target rifles. GECO loaded cartridges with wartime-manufactured Spandau cases, presumably ones they picked up when they bought the facility.
  - Mf. Munitionsfabrik – The portions of Spandau arsenal dedicated to making cartridge cases and bullets, assembling full cartridges, and packing them into cartons and crates. This would be found in the middle of the first line of the ammo carton label, followed by F1, F2 or F3 (the number of the assembly line that assembled the ammunition).
  - P Pulverfabrik – The portions of Spandau arsenal dedicated to manufacturing propellants. The code P. would be followed by the propellant batch number, the letter L. (for Lieferung > "Shipment") and the 2-digit year of manufacture.
- P Polte – Magdeburg, Saxony, Germany.
- D. Königlich Sächsisch Arsenal ("Royal Arsenal of Saxony") – Dresden, Saxony.
- DM Karlsruhe, DM K Deutsche Metallpatronenfabrik ("German Metallic Cartridge Factory") (1889–1896) – Karlsruhe, Baden, Germany. It started making Mauser rifle ammunition for the Argentinian Army in 1891 and the Prussian Army in 1893. It was reorganized in 1896 to form Deutsche Waffen und Munitionsfabriken (DWM). The "DM" headstamp was used by DWM until the early 20th century, perhaps after using up all the old DM cases and headstamp bunters in stock.
- DWM Deutsche Waffen und Munitionsfabriken (1896–1945) – Berlin-Borsigwalde, Germany. Between 1922 and 1936 the company is briefly renamed Berlin-Karlsruher Industrie-Werke AG (BERKA). It secretly begins armament production in 1928.
- H E & C Patronenhulsenfabrik Henri Ehrmann & Cie. (1872–1878) – Karlsruhe, Baden, Germany. A cartridge-case factory set up by Henri Ehrmann and Leopold & Wilhelm Holtz. It is bought out by engineer Wilhelm Lorenz in 1878 and becomes Deutsche Metallpatronenfabrik Lorenz In 1883 it begins production of complete cartridges and is renamed Deutsche Metallpatronenfabrik Karlsruhe-Baden. Bought out by Ludwig Loewe & Cie in 1889 and merged with Pulverfabrik Rottweil-Hamburg ("Rottweil Powdermill at Hamburg") and the Vereinigte Rheinisch-Westfälische Pulverfabriken ("United Rhenish & Westphalian Powdermills") to form Deutsche Metallpatronenfabrik.
- N & S Niebecker und Schumacher – Solingen, Germany.

(1919–1926)

The post-war German government assembled cartridges at the Wehrkreis ("Defense District") arsenals. War industries were reduced to monopolies: Polte was selected to supply cartridge cases and bullets and Dynamit Nobel was selected to provide explosives and propellants. Cartridge-loading machines were installed at artillery depots to train technicians in how to operate the machinery in times of emergency. The Wehrkreise were reorganized and increased after Hitler came to power.

- I (Königsberg) (1919–1932) – Königsberg Arsenal
- II (Stettin) (1919–1932) – ?
- III (Berlin) (1919–1932) – Jüterbog Arsenal
- IV (Dresden) (1919–1932) – Zeithain/Riesa Arsenal
- V (Stuttgart) (1919–1932)
- VI (Münster) (1919–1932) – ?
- VII (Munich) (1919–1932) – Ingolstadt
- VIII (Breslau) (1919–1932) – ?
- IX (Kassel) (1919–1932) – ?
- X (Hamburg) (1919–1932) – ?
- XI (Hannover) (1919–1932) – ?
- XII (Wiesbaden) (1919–1932) – ?
- XIII (Nurnberg) (1919–1932) – ?
- XVII (Wien) (1938-1945)
- XVIII (Salzberg) (1938-1945)
- AI Deutsche Waffen und Munitionsfabriken A.G. (1936?-1939) – Lübeck, Germany. Headstamp used by Germany to covertly supply the Spanish Nationalists during the Spanish Civil War (1936–1939). The headstamp has "AI" at the 12 o'clock position (perhaps to copy the headstamp of the Dutch Artillerie-Inrichtingen munitions works), large lower-case letter "e"s at the 3- and 9-o'clock positions, and the year of production at the 6 o'clock position.
- DWM B Deutsche Waffen und Munitionsfabriken (1896–1945) – Berlin-Borsigwalde, Germany.
- DWM H Deutsche Waffen und Munitionsfabriken (1940–1945) – 's-Hertogenbosch, North Brabant, Netherlands. The Nederlandsche Wapen-en Munitiefabriek NV. factory run by the German occupation forces.
- DWM K Deutsche Waffen uund Munitionsfabriken (1896–1945) – Karlsruhe, Germany.
- DWM L Deutsche Waffen und Munitionsfabriken – Lübeck-Schlutup, Schleswig-Holstein, Germany.
- N Rheinisch-Westfälische Sprengstoff, A.G. (RWS) – Nuremberg, Germany. Made gunpowder and complete cartridges.
- P Polte Armaturen-und-Maschinenfabrik A.G., Werk Magdeberg – Magdeburg, Sachsen, Germany. After Versailles they were the official supplier of ammunition components to the Weimar Republic. Made cartridge cases and bullets from 1919 to 1926? and complete cartridges from 1926? to 1945. There were also cover-headstamps used to pretend that Polte, the official contractor for the Weimar Republic, manufactured them.
  - Pi Hirtenberger Patronenfabrik – Hirtenberg, Austria. Renamed the Otto Eberhardt Patronenfabrik after the German occupation.
  - Pu H. Burgsmüller & Söhne – Kreiensen, Germany. A small gunsmithing firm that made hunting shotguns and drillings. They later got into munitions production.
  - Pö Gehre Dampfmesser GmbH – Sebaldushof, Treuenbrietzen, Brandenburg, Germany. Dr. Martin Böhme was an engineer whose factory made gas, steam and liquid gauges and a sideline in metalwares. In 1926 the metalware factory in the hamlet of Sebaldushof was bought out by the Kopp Brothers of Berlin and it was renamed to Metallwarenfabrik Truenbrietzen.
  - Ps – Production by the Swedish government.
- PVT Polizeischule fuer Technik und Verkehr ("Police Academy for Technology and Transport") (1927?-1945) – Berlin, Germany. The Polizeischule fuer Technik und Verkehr was founded in 1927? The central academy building was designed in 1929 and built by 1934. It was renamed the Technische Polizeischule ("Technical Police Academy") in 1936. The PVT monogram and government Eagle property mark was inscribed on its small arms at the factory by Simson.
- SKD Selve-Kronbiegel-Dornheim A.-G. (1924–1945) – Sömmerda, Thuringia, Germany. A partnership between three former arms manufacturers who were turning to cartridge manufacture. Selve owned the Braun und Bloem pinfire cartridge trademarks, manufactured pinfire cartridges at the Fabrik von Braun und Bloem, and operated out of Düsseldorf. Rheinmetall owned the Dreyse und Collenbusch needlefire cartridge trademarks and operated out of Sömmerda, Thüringen; it used the name Kronbiegel for Ehrfurt merchant Friedrich Kronbiegel (?-1820) – Dreyse's first partner. G.[eorge] C.[arl] Dornheim owned the GECADO trademark, the B.STAHL Metallhulsenfabrik – Suhl ammunition plant in Suhl (which made metal cartridge cases), and the Lindender Zünderhütchen-, Patronen- und Tonwarenfabrik in Empelde, Ronnenberg, Hanover (which made percussion caps and primers, assembled cartridges, and made clay pottery and dishes). SKD manufactured ammunition under the SELKADO ammunition trademark until 1940. G.C. Dornheim A.G. sold the cartridge plant in Suhl in 1925 and sold off the factory in Empelde and the GECADO ammunition trademark to Dynamit-Nobel in 1927. Afterwards RWS began producing ammunition for G.C. Dornheim.
- Has Pulverfabrik Hasloch – Hasloch, Bavaria, Germany. Made propellants.
- Mog. Deutsche Sprengchemie, Werk Moschwig – Moschwig, Germany. Made explosives and gunpowder.
- Rdf. Dynamit Nobel, Werk Reinsdorf – Reinsdorf, Germany. Made explosives and gunpowder. Absorbed by I.G. Farben in 1926, and then by WASAG (Westfälisch-Anhaltische Sprengstoff-Actien-Gesellschaft) in 1945.
  - Rdf 128 Pulverfabrik Walsrode – Walsrode, Germany. A cover code as a subterfuge to pretend that the powder had been made by Dynamit Nobel, the official explosives and propellant manufacturer for the Weimar Republic.
- Rottw. Pulverfabrik Rottweil ("Gunpowder Factory at Rottweil"), Rottweil, Baden-Wurttemburg, Germany. Made gunpowder. A particular type of shotgun-cartridge propellant called "Rottweil Powder" was invented by them.
- Tr. Troisdorf – Troisdorf, Germany. Manufactured propellants.
- Walsr. Pulverfabrik Walsrode ("Gunpowder Factory at Walsrode") – Walsrode, Germany. Made gunpowder.

P-Codes (1926–1941)

The German government adopted coded headstamps for military ammunition to keep the identity of their suppliers secret. This was briefly continued during the early war and included factories in occupied countries. It was a subterfuge to pretend that Polte manufactured the items.

Headstamps had the cartridge manufacturer's P-code at 12 o'clock, the cartridge case type (e.g., S* for brass) at 3 o'clock, the Lot number at 6 o'clock, and the 2-digit year of production at 9 o'clock. Steel-cased ammunition had a combined code at the 3 o'clock position that was composed of the Roman numeral code for the steel mill (I through XXIII), the lower-case letter code for the firm that plated the cases (a through z?), and the composition of the steel alloy used (1 through 17). (e.g., IXw1).

- P.14A Waffenwerke Brünn A.-G. ("Armory at Brno"), Werk Povazska Bystrica - Považská Bystrica, Czechoslovakia. Operated under German occupation. Later renamed Povazske Strojárne ("Factory at Povaska") post-war.
- P.25 Metallwarenfabrik Treuenbrietzen G.m.b.H, Werk A (Sebaldushof) – Sebaldushof, Treuenbrietzen, Pommern, Germany. This was the first factory owned by the Kopp Brothers. They expanded to Selterhof (Treuenbrietzen) (1934), Roederhof (Belzig) (1935), Metgethen and Salzwedel.
- P.28 Deutsche Waffen u. Munitionsfabriken A.-G. (DWM), Karlsruhe, Germany
- P.69 Patronen-, Zündhütchen- und Metallwarenfabrik A.-G. (formerly Sellier & Bellot Schönebeck) – Schönebeck-an-der-Elbe, Salzlandkreis, Sachsen-Anhalt, Germany. Made cartridges, primers and detonator caps, and metalware.
- P90D Munitionsfabriken Prag (vormals Sellier & Bellot) – Vlasim, Czechoslovakia.
- P.94 Kabel- und Metallwerke- Neumeyer A.-G. – Nürnberg, Germany.
- P.120 Dynamit A.-G. (DAG), Werk Empelde (1928–1945) – Empelde, Ronnenberg, Hanover, Germany. Formerly Lindender Zünderhütchen- und Patronen-fabrik ("percussion-cap- and cartridge-factory of Linden") (?-1927); closed for a year for reorganization and then reopened in 1928.
- P.131 Deutsche Waffen und Munitionsfabriken A.-G. (DWM), Berlin-Borsigwalde, Germany
- P.132 Draht-und-Metallwarenfabriken GmbH ("Wire and Metal Goods Factory") - Salzwedel, Saxony.
- P.151 Rheinisch-Westfälische Sprengstoff A.-G. (RWS) ("Rhenish-Westphalian Explosives Co."), Werk Nürnberg-Stadeln – Nürnberg-Stadeln, Germany.
- P.154 Polte Metallwarenfabrik, Werk Grüneberg (formerly Grüneberger Metallgeselschaft G.m.b.H.) – Grüneberg (Nordbahn), Brandenburg, Germany
- P.163 Metallwarenfabrik Treuenbrietzen G.m.b.H., Werk Selterhof – Selterhof, Treuenbrietzen, Pommern, Germany.
- P.181 Hugo A. Schneider A.-G. (HASAG) – Leipzig, Germany.
- P.186 Metallwerk Wolfenbüttel G.m.b.H. - Wolfenbüttel, Lower Saxony, Germany.
- P.198 Metallwarenfabriken Treuenbrietzen GmbH., Werk Röderhof (1935-?) – Roederhof, Belzig, Germany.
- P207 Metallwerk Odertal GmbH – Odertal, Post Lautaberg, Harz, Germany.
- P.249 Finower Industrie G.m.b.H. – Finow/Mark, Germany.
- P.334 Mansfeld A.-G. Metallwarenfabrik, Werk Rothenburg – Saale, Rothenburg, Germany
- P.369 Teuto Metallwerke G.m.b.H., Osnabrück, Germany
- P.405 Rheinisch-Westfälische Sprengstoff A.-G. (RWS), Werk Durlach (formerly Gustav Genschow & Co.); Durlach, Germany.
- P.413 Deutsche Waffen- und Munitions-fabriken A.G. (DWM), Lûbeck-Schlutup, Schleswig-Holstein, Germany.
- P.490 Hugo A. Schnieder A.G. (HASAG), Werk Altenburg – Altenburg, Thuringia, Germany.
- P.635 Gustloff-Werk Hirtenberg (Otto Eberhardt Patronenfabrik) – Hirtenberg, Niederdonau, Austria. A division of Gustloff Werk (Gustloff Works), a division of the Wilhelm Gustloff Stiftung (Wilhelm Gustloff Foundation), a nationalized corporation composed of companies confiscated from Jewish owners or partners. It was later renamed for Otto Eberhardt.

Letter Codes (1940–1945)

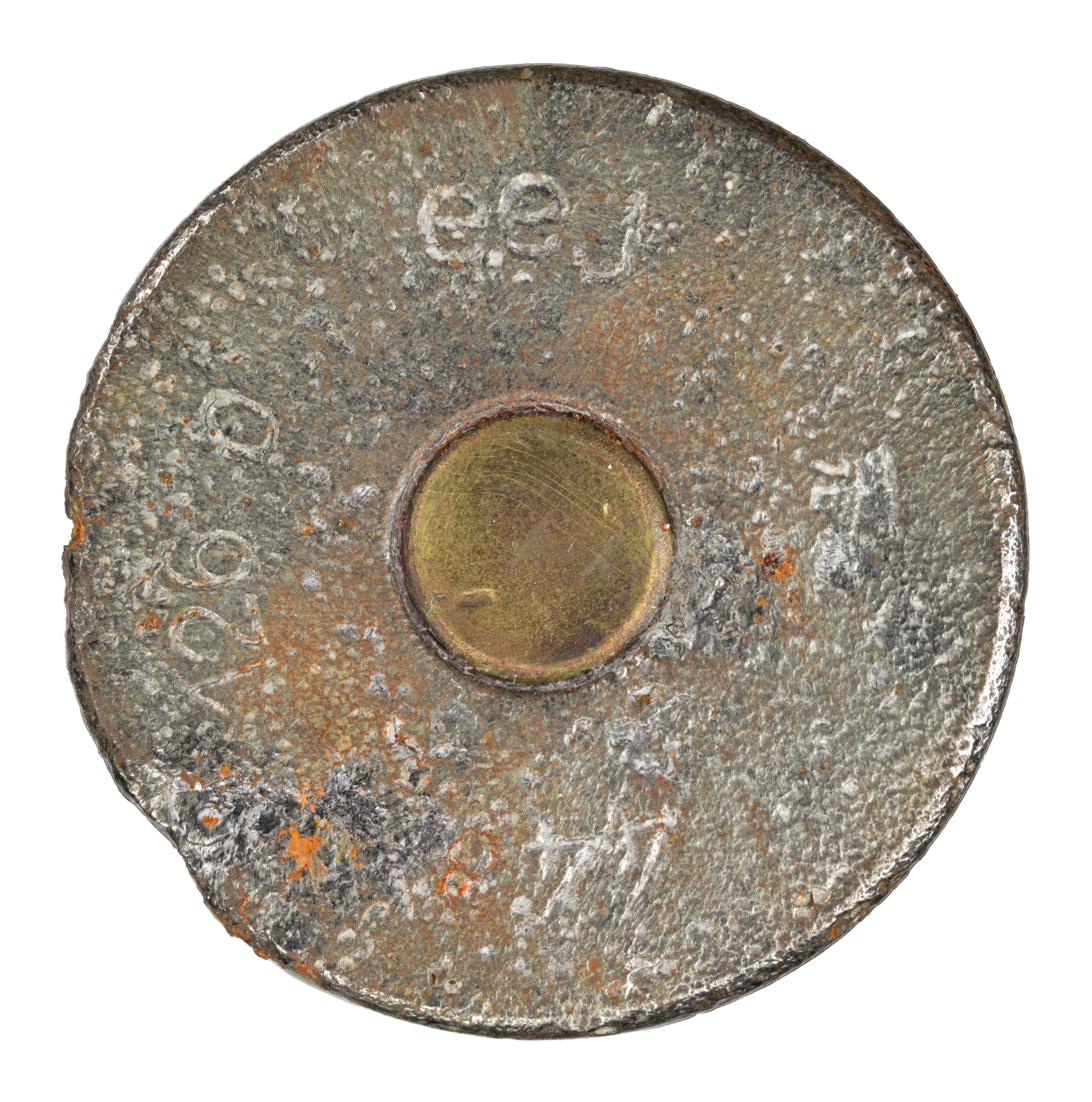
Two headstamps of 20×138mmB ammunition (german production)
Top: „eej“ for Märkisches Walzwerk GmbH
Bottom: „wg“ for HASAG, Hugo Schneider AG

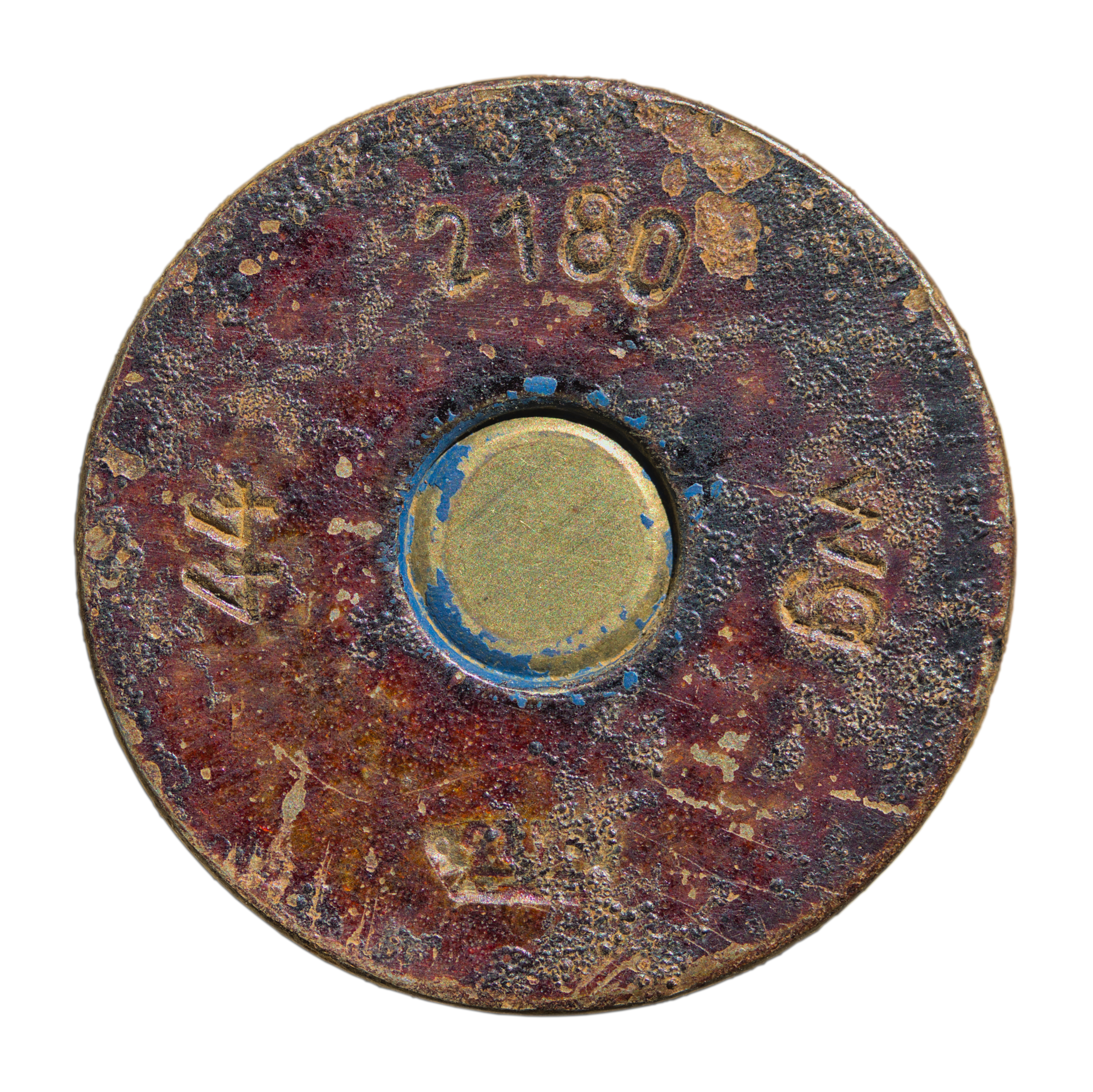
- ak Munitionsfabriken Prag ("Munitions Factory – Prague") (formerly Sellier & Bellot) (Occupation: 1938–1945) – Vlasim, Czechoslovakia.
- auy Polte Metallwarenfabrik, Werk Grüneberg (formerly Grüneberger Metallgeselschaft G.m.b.H.) – Grüneberg (Nordbahn), Brandenburg, Germany
- bne Metallwerk Odertal GmbH – Odertal, Post Lautaberg, Harz, Germany.
- cg Finower Industrie GmbH – Finow, Mark, Brandenburg.
- ch DWM Lüttich (formerly FN-Herstal, Liège) (Occupied: 1940–1944) – Liège, Belgium.
- cxm Gustav Genschow & Co. A.-G. (Geco) (1887–1959) – Berlin, Germany. Ammunition manufacturer and sporting arms wholesaler. They owned ammunition plants in Durlach and Wolfartsweier; a leather-goods factory in Hachenburg; associated arms factories in Zella-Mehlis, Suhl, and Liège; and had stores in Cologne, Suhl, Frankfurt am Main, Nuremberg, and Königsberg. In 1924 they bought a firearms factory in Spandau from Deutsche Werke. In 1927 they were bought out by I.G. Farben and were allied with RWS. In 1938 they were one of the firms who bought the rights to manufacture the Klein-Kaliber Wehrsportgewehr ("Small-Caliber Military Sports Rifle", or KKW), a .22-caliber competition and training rifle sold to the public. They also bored rifle-barrel blanks for the K98k Mauser and Sturmgewehr 44.
- de Hugo Schneider AG (HASAG) (1944–1945) – Leipzig, Germany.
- dnh Rheinisch-Westfälische Sprengstoff A.-G., (Previously Gustav Genschow & Co.) Werk Durlach, Germany.
- dou Waffenwerke Brunn (formerly Zbrojovka Brno) (Occupation: 1938–1945) – Považská Bystrica, Czechoslovakia.
- eba Metallwarenfabrik Scharfenberg-u. Teubert G.m.b.H. - Breitungen-Werra, Thuringia, Germany.
- eej Märkisches Walzwerk GmbH – Strausberg bez., Potsdam, Germany
- emp Dynamit A.-G., Werk Empelde – Empelde, Ronnenberg, Hanover, Germany.
- fer Metallwerke Wandhofen GmbH – Wandhofen, Schwerte an der Ruhr, Nordrhein-Westfalen, Germany.
- fva Draht- und Metallwarenfabrik GmbH ("Wire- and Metalware-factory") – Salzwedel, Saxony, Germany.
- Hak Hanseatisches Kettenwerke ("Hanseatic Chain Works") (1935-?) – Langenhorn, Hamburg Gau, Germany. A division of Pötz und Sand Metallwaren of Monheim that also manufactured autocannon and light artillery shells. It also managed the ammunition factories in occupied and Vichy France (1940–1944).
- hhw Metallwerke Silberhütte GmbH, St-Andreasberg-im-Harz, Goslar, Lower Saxony, Germany.
- hla Metallwarenfabrik Treuenbrietzen G.m.b.H., Werk Sebaldushof – Sebaldushof, Treuenbrietzen, Pommern, Germany.
- hlb Metallwarenfabrik Treuenbrietzen G.m.b.H., Werk Selterhof – Selterhof, Treuenbrietzen, Pommern, Germany.
- hlc Zieh- und Stanz-werke GmbH ("[Wire] Drawing and [Metal] Punching Works") – Schleusingen, Thüringen
- hrn Presswerke G.m.b.H. – Metgethen, Ostpreußen, Germany (now Imeni Alexandra Kosmodemyanskogo, Kaliningrad oblast, Russian Federation)
- htg Polte Armaturen- und Maschinenfabriken, AG - Duderstadt Plant, Westphalia, Germany.
- kam HASAG (formerly P.W.U. Fabryka Amunicji Skarżysko-Kamienna) (occupied 1939–1944) – Skarżysko-Kamienna, Poland.
- naq Graphische Kunstanstalt Karl Vogel (Karl Vogel "Graphic Arts Institution") – Leipzig, Germany. Made pasteboard cartons and cardboard boxes for ammunition; the manufacturer code and year of production were impressed on the box. May have also made ammo labels, as they did high-quality color printing work before the war.
- ndn Heinrich Bluecher Fabrik technischer Buersten ("industrial-brush-making factory") – Spremberg, Spree-Neiße, Brandenburg, Germany. A factory that manufactured 9×19mm cartridge cases to be filled elsewhere.
- oma Ernst Mahla Blechwarenwerke ("sheetmetal-ware works") – Prague, Bohemia, Czechoslovakia. A factory that made 9×19mm ball and armor-piercing ammunition.
- oyj Atelier de Construction de Tarbes – Tarbes, France. Produced ammunition during the German Occupation (1940–1944).
- pas Cartucherie de Toulouse - Toulouse, France. Produced ammunition during the German Occupation (1940–1944).
- wa HASAG, Hugo Schneider AG, Abteilung Lampenfabrik – Leipzig, Germany. Found on ammunition headstamps and cannon shell cases
- wb HASAG, Hugo Schneider AG – Berlin-Koepenick plant. See 'wa'
- wc HASAG, Hugo Schneider AG – Meuselwitz plant, Thuringia.
- wd HASAG, Hugo Schneider AG (Hasag Werk II) – Taucha, Saxony plant.
- we HASAG, Hugo Schneider AG – Langewiesen, Thuringia plant.
- wf HASAG, Hugo Schneider AG – Kielce plant, Poland.
- wg HASAG, Hugo Schneider AG – Altenburg plant.
- wh HASAG, Hugo Schneider AG – Eisenach plant.
- wj HASAG, Hugo Schneider AG – Oberweissbach, Thuringia plant.
- wk HASAG, Hugo Schneider AG – Schlieben plant.
- wm HASAG, Hugo Schneider AG – Dermbach plant, Thuringia.
- wn HASAG, Hugo Schneider AG – Derrnabach Dermbach plant, Thuringia (Often confused with 'wm').

(1946–present)

The headstamp has the manufacturer code at 12 o'clock, 2-digit year of production at 3 o'clock, 2-digit week of production at 6 o'clock, and NATO interchangeability symbol (+) at 9 o'clock. Example: MEN / 79 21 / (+) would mean it was manufactured by Metallwerk Elisenhütte Nassau GmbH in week 21 (i.e., May 21–27) of 1979.

- DAG Dynamit Nobel A-G () – Troisdorf, Rhein-Sieg-Kreis, North Rhine-Westphalia, Germany and Fürth. It owned the RWS, Geco, and Rottweil brands. In 2002 its ammunition factories and their brands were purchased by RUAG (Rüstungs Unternehmen Aktiengesellschaft) and were spun off to form RUAG Ammotec GmbH (Fürth).
- ME or MEN Metallwerk Elisenhütte Nassau G.m.b.H. (1957–present) – Nassau, Lahn, Rhineland-Palatinate, Germany. Made part of the CBC Group in 2007.
- MS Manusaar A-G (1953–1973) – Büdingen, Hessen, West Germany. Also known as Manusaar-Diehl-Büdingen, Saarbrücken, FRG; Manusaar-Büdingen Saarbrücken; and Société Manusaar-Büdingen. Manusaar-Diehl was founded in the '50s as a partnership between Manurhin (France) and Munitionsfabrikanten Karl Diehl (Germany); the name Manusaar is a combination of MANUrhin and SAAR (the Saar Valley, where the factory was based). It manufactured primers from 1953 to 1972 and cartridges from 1957 to 1973; it went out of business in 1973 due to a loss of market share to other, larger European manufacturers.

=== Greece (23) ===
- ΕΠΚ (Ελληνικό Πυριτιδοποιείο Καλυκοποιείο > Ellinikó Pyritidopoieío Kalykopoieío (Pyrkal) = "Hellenic Powder & Cartridge Factory") (1908-1950s) - Athens, Greece. The Greek alphabet version of the headstamp, with the manufacturer's code (ΕΠΚ) at 12 o'clock and the caliber or cartridge name at 6 o'clock.
  - GPC ("Greek Powder and Cartridge Company") - The English language version of the headstamp.
- HXP Pyrkal (1950s–2004) – Athens, Greece. Manufactures cartridges and disintegrating belt links. Merged with Hellenic Arms Industry in 2004 to become Hellenic Defence Systems. The headstamp had the manufacturer's code (HXP) at 12 o'clock and the two-digit year of production at 6 o'clock.
- P C H, PC Pouderie et Cartoucherie Hellenique (Pyrkal). Pyrkal's export and commercial headstamp during the interwar years (1920s and 1930s). Packaging was in French for sales to French Colonial territories like North Africa and the French Mandate. The PC headstamp was used on British contract orders up until the German occupation (1941–1945).

=== India (72) ===
The Indian government property mark was an arrowhead over a letter "I" for India.

- D Dum Dum Arsenal – Dum Dum, Calcutta, West Bengal state, India. The "D" was at the 9 o'clock position and the Indian property mark was at 3 o'clock. They invented and manufactured the .303 Mk.II Special, a soft-point semi-jacketed Ball cartridge for the Enfield Rifle that was later banned by the Hague Convention.
- D↑F Dum Dum Factory – Dum Dum, Calcutta, West Bengal state, India. The "D↑F" was at the 12 o'clock position, the Indian property mark was at 3 o'clock, the Lot number was at 6 o'clock, and the cartridge Mark number was at 9 o'clock.
- K Kirkee Arsenal (1872–1913?) – Kirkee cantonment, Poona district, Maharashtra state, India. Founded in 1817 to manufacture small arms. Expanded to include a cartridge-making factory in 1872 and an explosives factory in 1942. The "K" was at the 9 o'clock position and the Indian property mark was at 3 o'clock. They manufactured the .303 Mk.II Special, a soft-point semi-jacketed Ball cartridge for the Enfield Rifle that was later banned by the Hague Convention.
- K↑F Kirkee Factory (1914–1960) – Kirkee cantonment, Poona district, Maharashtra state, India. The "K↑F" was at the 12 o'clock position, the Indian property mark was at 3 o'clock, the Lot number was at 6 o'clock, and the cartridge Mark number was at 9 o'clock.
- KH Khamaria Factory (1990s-Present) – Khamaria, Jabalpur district, Madhya Pradesh state, India.
- N Dum Dum Arsenal, Northern Circuit – Dum Dum, Calcutta, West Bengal state, India. The "N" was at the 9 o'clock position and the Indian property mark was at 3 o'clock. The cartridge Mark number was at 12 o'clock and the Lot number was at 6 o'clock.
- OFV Ordnance Factory at Varangaon (1964–present) – Varangaon, Jalgaon district, Maharashtra state, India.
- OK Ordnance Factory at Khamaria (1942–1947; 1947–Present) – Khamaria, Jubbulpore district, Central India Agency (later Madhya Pradesh state after Independence), India. It manufactures cartridge and shell components, propellants, and small arms ammunition.
- S Kirkee Arsenal, Southern Circuit – Kirkee cantonment, Poona district, Maharashtra state, India. The "S" was at the 9 o'clock position and the Indian property mark was at 3 o'clock. The cartridge Mark number was at 12 o'clock and the Lot number was at 6 o'clock.

=== Israel (31) ===
Israel has supposedly manufactured ammunition under the Spanish S, SA, and SB headstamps. This is ammunition captured from Egypt and Syria, which bought ammunition from Spain and Italy.

- AE Eretz Ayalon ("Ayalon Institute") (1945–1948) – Kibbutzim Hill, Rehovot, British Mandate, Palestine. An underground munitions factory hidden in the basement of a community center that had a working bakery and a laundry. The copper for the casings was acquired by scrap dealers who supposedly were using it to make brass lipstick cases. They made 9×19mm Parabellum and 7.92×57mm Mauser cartridges.
- IMI, TZZ, or ת צ (T Tz, or T'aasiya Tz'vaeet, "Military Industries") Israeli Military Industries – Tel Aviv, Israel. Manufactures small-arms cartridges, clips, and disintegrating belt links. TZZ is the NATO Manufacturer's Identification Symbol for IMI's Small Arms Ammunition Division. The first two TZZ lots produced in 1982 for the US Navy had the incorrect TZ headstamp belonging to Texas Foundries Inc.

=== Italy (15) ===
- B. Stabilimento Pirotecnico di Bologna ("Pyrotechnical Factory at Bologna") – Bologna, Emilia-Romagna, Italy. The Royal Army Pyrotechnical Laboratory.
- BPD Bombrini-Parodi-Delfino (1912–1968/1988) – Colleferro, Rome, Italy. A chemical company that made explosives and gunpowder. After World War I it expanded into fertilizer and cement and after World War II it diversified into industrial metalworking, textiles, and chemicals. In 1968 the Parodi-Delfino family sold their interest in BPD to SNIA-Viscosa. SNIA-Viscosa merged BPD with their chemical division, which was renamed SNIA-BPD. SNIA-BPD later sold its BPD holdings to Simmel Difesa in 1988 and reorganized itself as SNIA S.p.A.
- GFL Giulio Fiocchi Lecco – Lecco, Italy.
- HB Enrico Barthe & Cie (1883–1889) – Milan, Italy. A company created as a front for the Società Franco Italiana per la fabbricazione delle Munizioni di caccia, da tiro, da guerra, ed affini (SFIM, "Franco-Italian Corporation for the manufacture of hunting, target-shooting, warfare, and related munitions"). SFIM was the Italian sales division of Société Française des Munitions (SFM, "French Association for Munitions"), the munitions division of the French firm Gevelot. It was an Italian-registered firm created for tax purposes. The president of the firm, Henri Barthe, was an SFM employee that used to be owner of Tarbes Freres before merging with SFM in 1883. French by birth and nationality, they recorded his name as Enrico Barthe in the incorporation papers – although being an Italian citizen or of Italian birth were not prerequisites for the tax law loophole.
- L or Lri Polverificio Esercito di Fontana Liri (PEFL) ("Military Explosives Factory of Fontana Liri") (1893–present) – Fontana Liri, Frosinone, Lazio. An explosives and propellant factory. Its marking is on ammunition packaging when they provide the propellant.
- LBC Leon Beaux & Cie. (1889–1932) – Milan, Italy. A company created as a front for SFIM, the Italian sales division of SFM, the munitions division of the French firm Gevelot. It was an Italian-registered firm created for tax purposes. Leon Beaux, an SFIM salesman, took over from Henri Barthe as president of SFIM in 1889 and the front company was renamed after him.
- MCM Munizioni e Cartucce Martignoni ("Martignoni Ammunition and Cartridges") (?-Present) – Genoa, Italy. Manufactured pinfire cartridges. Was acquired by Nobel in 1929 to become Nobel Sport Martignoni SpA.
- PC or PECA Lo Stabilimento Pirotecnico dell'Esercito di Capua ("Army Pyrotechnical Factory at Capua") (1856–Present) – Capua, Caserta, Campania, Italy. Originally founded as part of the Sala degli Artefici ("Hall of the Arts") during the Murat regime (1808–1815). The cartridge factory and cannon foundry were moved to the Castello di Lecce in 1856 and remained until after World War II, where the facilities were moved elsewhere to Capua. Since July, 2012 the company now manufactures 9mm NATO, 5.56mm NATO, and 7.62mm NATO ammunition for Fiocchi.
- SMI Società Metallurgica Italiana (Italian Metallurgical Corporation) (1911–2006) – Campo Tizzoro, San Marcello Pistoiese, Pistoia, Tuscany, Italy. Manufactured small arms cartridges and light artillery shells for the Italian Army and Navy. The factory was closed in 2006 when the company stopped manufacturing munitions.

=== Lithuania (47) ===
- L D Linkaičiai Dirbtuves ("Workshop at Linkaičiai") (1931–1940) – Linkaičiai, Lithuania. The factory originally just bought the components from Belgian companies like Fabrique Nationale and assembled them onsite from 1931. They weren't able to make their own components self-sufficiently until after 1937. The headstamp had the "L" at the 9 o'clock position and the "D" at the 3 o'clock position; the 2-digit year of production was in the 12 o'clock position and the batch number was at the 6 o'clock position.
- GGG AB Giraitės Ginkluotes Gamykla ("Giraitės Armament Factory") (2000–present) – Vijuku km., Uzliedziu sen., Kaunas raj., Kaunas County, Lithuania. First manufactured 7.62×39mm Soviet rounds in 2002, NATO-standard 5.56×45mm NATO and 7.62×51mm NATO rounds in 2005 (earning the NATO interchangeability rating in 2006), and sporting .223 Remington and .308 Winchester rounds in 2012. The headstamp has the caliber at 12 o'clock, manufacturer's code at 6 o'clock, 2-digit year of production at 3 o'clock, and NATO interchangeability symbol at 9 o'clock.

=== The Netherlands (17) ===
The early cartridges were made exclusively by Artillerie Inrichtingen, the Dutch state-run munitions factory, until the early-1980s.

The pre-war headstamp has the 1- or 2-letter code for the brass supplier of the cartridge case at 6 o'clock, the 2-digit year the cartridge case was produced at 12 o'clock, the lot number of the propellant at 9 o'clock, and the 2-digit year the finished cartridge was assembled at 3 o'clock. The brass suppliers or cartridge manufacturers would sometimes have the brass batch or cartridge lot number to the right of their code letter.

The post-war headstamp had the manufacturer code (AI / EMZ or NWM) at the 6 o'clock position.

- AI Artillerie Inrichtingen NV ("Artillery Factories") (1679–1983) – Zaandam-Hembrug, Netherlands. Reorganized as EMZ in 1983.
- D N.V. Nederlandsche Patronen-, Slaghoedjes-en Metaalwarenfabriek ("Dutch Cartridges, Percussion Caps and Metalwares Factory") – Dordrecht (Dordt), Netherlands. Dordt, the English name for Dordrecht, was sometimes used on the packaging.
- EMZ Eurometaal Zaandam NV (1983–1999) – Zaandam-Hembrug, Netherlands.
- MB Z N.V. Plaatmetaalindustrie van Mouwerik & Bal – Zeist ("von Mouwerik & Bal Sheetmetal Business of Zeist") – Zeist, Netherlands. Made disintegrating metal link belts and en-bloc clips. The contractor's mark is "MB" over "Z".
- NWM Nederlandsche Wapen-en Munitiefabriek 'de Kruithoorn' NV ("Dutch Weapon & Munitions Factory – 'The Powder Flask'") (1948–1998) – 's-Hertogenbosch, Netherlands. Made a brand of aluminum-hulled shotshells called Bataaf ("Batavian"). Industriewerke Karlsruhe (IWK, part of the Quandt Group) acquired a majority of its stock in 1961. NWM made hunting ammunition for IWK under the DWM label and made parts for Mauser Werke Luger and HSc pistols. All shares were bought by Rheinmetall in 1975.

=== Norway (25) ===
- AYR A/S Ammunisjons Fabrikker Raufoss ("Ammunition Factory at Raufoss") - Raufoss, Norway. Now divided into several smaller ammunition and munitions companies: Nammo, Raufoss Technologies, etc. RA headstamp.
- BF Bakelittfabrikken A/S ("Bakelite Factories") (1946-Present) - Aurskog, Norway. Founded originally in Oslo in 1946, then moved to Aurskog in 1955. They invented and marketed the first fully plastic-hulled blank ammunition in 1953 and worked with other manufacturers to develop similar rounds. The headstamp has the NATO symbol (+) at 12 o'clock, 2-digit year at 6 o'clock, BF at 9 o'clock, and 2-digit batch code at 3 o'clock.
- R A Raufoss Ammunisjonfabrikker ("Ammunition Factory at Raufoss") – Raufoss, Norway.
- RANO Raufoss og Norma projektilfabrikk ("Raufoss & Norma Projectile Factory") (1965–1989) – Oslo, Norway. A cooperative partnership between Raufoss and Norma that provided ammunition for Norwegian sports organizations.

=== Pakistan (76) ===
- POF Pakistan Ordnance Factories – Wah Cantt., Taxila, Rawalpindi District, Rawalpindi Division, Punjab, Pakistan. They make munitions and small arms ammunition. They used to make .38/200, .303 British (1951–2006) and .30-06 Springfield, but now make 9mm Parabellum, 5.56mm NATO, 7.62mm M43 Soviet, 7.62mm NATO, 7.62mm M91 Russian, and 12.7mm ComBloc.

=== Poland (43) ===
Poland (1918–1939)

The young Polish state in 1918 had inherited arms from Prussia, Russia, Austria and France. The military were issued the Mauser rifle in 7.9×57mm Mauser (1918–1939) for frontline troops. Reservists in the Obrona Narodowa ("National Defense") received Lebels and Berthiers in 8×50mmR Lebel "Balle D" (1923–1937). Police and paramilitary forces were armed with Mosin-Nagants (classified Mosin Karabin M91/98/25) and Mannlichers converted to 7.9×57mm Mauser.

On the headstamp the cartridge manufacturer placed their code letters at the 12 o'clock position. Government-run factories that made ammunition for the military (Wytwornia Amunicji) placed the Polish National Eagle stamp instead. The case manufacturer's code letter or numeral was placed in the 6 o' clock position and the two digit percentage of copper in the case's brass (usually 67 for 7.9mm Mauser) was placed at the 9 o'clock position. The last two digits of year of production was placed at the 3 o'clock position. Beginning in 1926 the headstamps on domestically produced 8mm Lebel cartridges were done in the French style, with the 12- and 6-o'clock stamps at a right angle to the 9- and 3-o'clock stamps.

Bullets had the manufacturer code over the Quarter number and two-digit year of production engraved on the base (e.g. Pk/2-26 is Zaklady Amunicyjne, Pocisk, 2nd Quarter of 1926). 8mm Lebel "Balle D" bullets were differenced from 7.9mm Mauser bullets by a capital letter "D" inset between the contractor code and the date (e.g. Pk/D/2-26).

Ammunition packed loose in cartons were marked do KM (do Karabin Maszynowy, "for Machineguns") or do CKM (Ciężki Karabin Maszynowy, "for Heavy Machineguns"). Ammunition packed in clips were marked kar. am. (Karabinu Amunicji, "Rifle Ammunition") for rifles or do KBK (Karabinek, "for Short Rifle") for carbines. 7.9mm Mauser ammunition packets were marked Nb. MAUSER.KAL. 7.9 Wz. ("Cartridges, Mauser, 7.9 Caliber, Pattern..."), then followed by S for Spiczasty ("Pointed [Ball]") or SC for Spiczasty Ciężki ("Pointed, Heavy [Ball]"). 8mm Lebel "D" ammunition packets were marked Nb. Francuskie OSTRA ("Cartridges, French LIVE"). The Lot code had the 3-digit lot number (in Arabic numerals), month (in Roman numerals), and four-digit year. The third line had the code for the Ammunition Factory (W. AM. No.-#) that made it.

- I Wytwornia Amunicji (WYTW. AM., "Ammunition Factory") No.1 (Brest-Litovsk).
- II Wytwornia Amunicji No.2 (Poznań).
- III Wytwornia Amunicji No.3 (Warsaw).
- IV Wytwornia Amunicji No.4 (Kraków).
- V Wytwornia Amunicji No.5 (Przemyśl).
- F A S Fabrika Amunicji Skarzysko ("Ammunition Plant at Skarzysko) (1925–1939) – Skarżysko-Kamienna, Poland. Civilian ammunition brand manufactured by P.W.U. Fabryka Amunicji.
- W Wojskowa Wytwornia Amunicji Karabinowej (WWAK, "Military Rifle Ammunition Factory") (1921–1925) – Warsaw, Poland. Founded in 1921 using nationalized machinery liberated from the Georg Roth A.G. subsidiary factory in Poznań (formerly Posen). It made bullets, primers, cases, and complete cartridges. It was closed in 1925 and moved to Skarzysko.
- SK Państwowa Wytwornia Uzbrojenia Fabryka Amunicji (P.W.U. Fabryka Amunicji, "National Armament Factory – Ammunition Plant") (1925–1939) – Skarżysko-Kamienna, Poland. Founded in 1925 by moving the WWAK's machinery from Warsaw.
- N Norblin S.A.. Ammunition factory founded in 1922 in Warsaw. It had a metal foundry and cartridge production plant at Glownie that made cartridge brass for other firms as well. Ammunition made by Norblin had the Norblin "N" at both the 12 o'clock (cartridge manufacturer) and 6 o'clock (case manufacturer) positions.
- Pk Zaklady Amunicyjne, Pocisk, Spolka Akcyjna ("Ammunition Works 'Bullets' Joint Stock Company"), or Z.A. Pocisk S.A. – A Franco-Polish Joint Stock Company created in 1921 to supply the Polish Government with ammunition. Using machinery purchased from Hirtenberger of Austria, a cartridge plant was set up in Warsaw and a munitions plant was set up in Rembertów. In 1932 it was nationalized by the Polish Government, who consolidated all production at Rembertów. In 1934 it began producing the Darzbór ("Good Hunting") shotshell line. In 1935 it began production of the Gryf ("Griffin") shotshell line, which used French-made components by SFM that were assembled by Pocisk in Poland.
- Dz Walcownie Metali "Dziedzice" S.A. (1896–Present) – Dziedzice, Silesian Voivodeship. A metalworks that also manufactured cartridge cases.
- F or Fr Fraget – Warsaw, Poland. A metalworks that manufactured cartridge cases. It was originally a Russian-owned factory set up in the 1850s as for making galvanized silverplate wares. It was repurposed after World War I due to the economic crisis that followed the fall of the Austro-Hungarian and Russian empires.

Poland (1939–1945)

- kam Hugo Schneider AG (HASAG) Eisen und Metallwerke ("Iron and Metal Works") G.m.b.H. - Skarżysko-Kamienna, Poland. Manufactured ammunition and small arms for the German military using slave labor. The Germans removed all the machinery in 1945, then wrecked whatever they could before they retreated.
- nbe Hugo Schneider AG (HASAG) Eisen und Metallwerke GmbH, Werk Apparatebau Tschenstochau - Częstochowa, Poland.
- pae - probably HASAG Skarżysko-Kamienna.
- DZ Metallwalzwerke A.G. Dziedzitz – Dziedzitz, Gau Schlesien. In early 1940 they originally made brass cartridge cases and copper, aluminum and zinc alloys for the war effort. The facility was later focused on only producing duraluminum sheets and all its other machinery was shipped to other factories in Poland. The machinery was later returned in 1947.

Poland (1945–1989)

The Polish headstamp for Factory 21 either has the factory number in an oval or upside-down to keep it from being confused with the Hungarian and Romanian Factory 21s. This was extended to other Polish headstamps for consistency.

- (21) Państwowa Fabryka Amunicji Skarżysko-Kamienna ("State Ammunition Factory at Skarżysko-Kamienna") (1945–1948) – Skarżysko-Kamienna, Poland. Made small arms ammunition.
- 21 Zakłady Wyrobów Metalowych Skarżysko-Kamienna ("Skarżysko-Kamienna Metal Products Works") (1948–1988) – Skarżysko-Kamienna, Poland. Made small arms ammunition and the civilian MESKO brand, along with appliances and metalware. MESKO is an acronym for Zakłady Metalowe Skarzysko Kompania ("Metal Works Company at Skarzysko"). It was merged with the PREDOM appliance brand and renamed PREDOM-MESKO S.A. in 1975. It then separated again and was renamed MESKO S.A. in 1985.
- 21 General Sikorski Zakłady Metalowe MESKO ("General Sikorski MESKO Metal Works") (1988–1993) – Skarżysko-Kamienna, Poland. Renamed as an expression of Polish independence.
- 54 Factory 54 – Poniatowa, Poland. Only 7,62x25 Tokarev.
- 343 Factory 343 – Wrocław pilczyce. 1952-1973?
- PFA Państwowa Fabryka Amunicji ("State Ammunition Factory") (1945–1955?) – Skarżysko-Kamienna, Poland. Skarżysko-Kamienna's headstamp until they were assigned factory numbers.
- MESKO Marka Export Solidność Konkurencyjność Otwartość ("Brand for Export – Reliability, Competitiveness, and Honesty") – Skarżysko-Kamienna, Poland. Civilian hunting and competitive shooting ammunition brand that reworded the acronym for MESKO. In 2005 MESKO joined the PHZ Bumar Group, which consists of 22 manufacturing companies from the now privatized Polski Przemysł Obronny (PPO, "Polish Defense Industry").
- NITRON – NITRON S.A. Krupski Mlyn, Silesia, Poland. Only produced sport ammunition .22 short, .22 Long Rifle.

=== Portugal (24) ===
- * AE * Arsenal do Exercito ("Army Arsenal") – Lisbon, Portugal. In the cypher-style headstamp, the "A" is superimposed over the "E" and is at 12 o'clock, the 4-digit year is at 6 o'clock, and 5-pointed stars are at 9- and 3-o'clock.
- BF Arsenal do Exercito ("Army Arsenal") – Lisbon, Portugal. A cover headstamp used by the Portuguese government on ammunition sent to Angola, Rhodesia, and South Africa during the Border War. The code was created from the headstamp AE by moving one letter to the right in the alphabet. The headstamp code faces the rim, with the letter code at 6 o'clock, the batch number at 12 o'clock, the NATO Interchangeability symbol (+) at 9 o'clock, and the 2-digit year at 3 o'clock.
- FA Fabrica de Armas ("Arms Factory") (?-1902) – Santa Clara, Lisbon, Portugal.
- FCPQ Fábrica de Cartuchame e Pólvoras Quimicas ("Cartridge & Chemical Powder Factory") (1927–1947) – Chelas, Marvila, Lisbon, Portugal. Changed to Fabrica Nacional de Municoes de Armas Ligeiras (FNMAL) in 1947.
- FMBP, FBP Fábrica de Material de Guerra de Braço de Prata ("War Materiel Factory in Braça de Prata") (1907–1998) – Braço de Prata, Lisbon, Portugal.
- FNM Fabrica Nacional de Municoes de Armas Ligeiras ("National Small Arms Munitions Factory") (1947–2001) – Lisbon, Portugal.
- FPB? Fábrica da Pólvora em Barcarena ("Powdermill in Barcarena") (1619–1988) – Bacarena, Oeiras, Lisbon, Portugal.
- FPC Fábrica da Pólvora em Chellas ("Powdermill in Chelas") (1898–1927) – Chelas, Marvila, Lisbon, Portugal. Changed to Fábrica de Cartuchame e Pólvoras Quimicas (FCPQ) in 1927.

=== Romania (39) ===
UM stands for Uzina Mecanica (Mechanical Plant).

- 21 RPR, 21 Factory 21 (UM Cugir), Republica Populară Romînă ("Romanian People's Republic") (1947–present) – Cugir. The acronym RPR was used from 1947 to 1965 to differentiate the Romanian Factory 21 from the Hungarian and Polish Factory 21s.
- 22 Factory 22 (UM Sadu) (1970–present) – Bumbești-Jiu. Sadu was the name of a nearby town about 14 km away and was adopted as a cover.
- CMC Uzinele Metalurgice din Copșa - Mică și Cugir ("Metallurgical Works of Copșa Mica and Cugir") (1925–1944) – Cugir, Transylvania, Romania. Created in Paris in 1925 by investments by the Romanian government, the British firm Vickers-Armstrong, and the privatized Austrian firm UDR Co. (Uzinele de Fier si Domeniile Reşiţa – "Reşiţa Iron Works and Domains"), with production beginning in 1928. It made both small arms and ammunition, with the factory in Cugir and the metal-smelting plant in Copșa Mică. The Czech firm CZ-Brno replaced Vickers Armstrong in 1934 and CMC began producing ZB-30 machineguns and 7.92mm Mauser ammunition in 1935. In 1939 the Czechs' holdings in the company were taken over by Hermann Göring. Romania was taken over by a German-sponsored right-wing coup in 1940 and were German allies from 1941 to 1944. CMC made 9×19mm Parabellum and 7.92×57mm Mauser ammunition and the Orița submachine gun. CMC later became UM Cugir.
- kyn Astra, Fabrica Româna de Vagoane, Motoare, Armament și Muniții (" 'Astra', Romanian Factory for Wagons, Engines, Weapons, and Munitions") (1943–1944) – Brașov, Transylvania, Romania. The German contractor code for the Astra factory in Brașov. It manufactured artillery shells and land mines.
- kyo Întreprinderile metalurgice "Dumitru Voina", Societate Anonimă Română, Fabrica de Armament, Brașov (" 'Dumitru Voina' Metallurgy Enterprise, Romanian S.A., Armament Factory at Brașov) (1943–1944) – Brașov, Treansylvania, Romania. The German contractor code for the PAB metal works, owned by Mr. Dumitru Voina.
- PA Pirotehnia Armatei ("Army Pyrotechnics") (1861-1939) – Bucharest, Romania. The government explosives factory. It manufactured 9mm Steyr pistol, 6.5mm Mannlicher rifle, 13.2mm Hotchkiss Long HMG, 37mm Hotchkiss QF, and 53x176mmR M1887 Gruson QF cartridges. A third letter in the headstamp indicated the metal supplier or manufacturer for the cases. It was closed in 1944 when Romania pulled out of the war. It was renamed the "9th of May" Workshops in 1947 and was demilitarized and repurposed to make machinery and spare parts for the construction industry. It was privatized as PUMAC S.A. in the 1990s. The complex was demolished in 2009.
  - PAB Pirotehnia Armatei / Brașov (Armament Factory / Brașov) (?-1943) – Brașov.
  - PAF – Unknown.
  - PAH – Unknown.
  - PAM – Unknown.
  - PAR – Unknown.
  - PAT – Unknown.
- PA Pirotehnia Armatei (1939–1944) – Bumbești-Jiu. A factory set up with German investment and assistance. Closed in 1944. Reopened and name changed to UM Sadu in 1947. It manufactured 6.5mm Mannlicher and 13.2x99 Hotchkiss Long HMG cartridges.
- R SD ("Romania – SaDu") UM Sadu (2015–present) – The new headstamp for all Sadu ammunition production, replacing all previous commercial and military headstamps. This is in accordance with an arms industry reform (Law 295/2004, reviewed 2014) in which the first letter stands for Romania and the next letters are the two syllables of Sadu. R SD is at 10 o'clock, the 2-digit year is at 2 o'clock, and the metric caliber is at 6 o'clock. The "L" prefix to the metric caliber means "long" (i.e., L 5,56 or L 7,62×54mm).
- U Viromet S.A. (1936–1942; 1949–1991; 1991–present) – Victoria, Romania. A factory initially conceived by the Romanian military to make locally produced smokeless propellants. The military's proposal was approved in 1936 and government permission and planning were provided in 1937. The German firm Ferrostaal was contracted to build it in the hamlet of Ucea in the town of Victoria and provide technical assistance. Work began in 1939 but was stopped in 1942 due to wartime austerity measures. The contract was cancelled in 1944 when Romania declared war on Germany. In 1949 it was finished, reopened and renamed to Fabricile Ucea ("Factories at Ucea"). In the 1970s it started making its own primers, detonator caps, and fuses. Gradually it diversified from explosives and propellants to making refined chemicals, synthetic resins, and processed plastics. In 1991 its explosives, propellants and fuses division was spun off and renamed S.C Pirochim Victoria S.A, made a division of ROMARM, and transferred under R.A. Rompiro Făgăraş. The remainder of Viromet S.A. was reorganized and then placed under control by InterAgro S.A.

=== Serbia (73) ===
- FOMU Fabryka Oruzja i Municje, Užice ("Weapons and Munitions Factory – Užice") (1935–1940; 1944–1947) – Užice, Serbia, Yugoslavia. The invading Germans sabotaged the facility in 1940 but was reopened in 1944.
- PP, PPU or ППУ Prvi Partizanski [zavod] ad Užice ("First Partizan [factory] at Užice") (1941; 1947–Present) – Užice, Serbia. On September 24, 1941, the FOMU facility was liberated from the Germans, who had wrecked the machinery and burned down the administration building. The ammunition production machinery and tool shop were moved to an underground vault under the National Bank and the other machinery was dispersed to the surrounding towns. An explosion on November 22, 1941, that killed 130 workers forced its closure. The factory moved back to the FOMU facility in 1944. It was renamed Prvi Partizanki zavod ad Užice (PPU) on September 5, 1947.

=== Singapore (32) ===
- CHJ Chartered Industries of Singapore (1967–2000) – Singapore. The headstamp used a letter code for the date (O = 0, A = 1, etc.; "J" is used instead of "I"): the first two letters were the last two digits of the year and the third was the letter 'B' for "Berdan primed". FJ B would be 1969, GG B would be 1977, and JH would be 1998. When the company switched to Boxer primed cartridges in the 1980s, the third letter was dropped. Chartered Industries was merged with ST Kinetics in 2000.

=== Republic of South Africa (18) ===
South Africa left the Commonwealth of Nations in 1961 and was re-admitted in 1994. It remains a Republic.
NOTE: The manufacturer and last two digits of the year are on the upper arc of the stamp (e.g., WA 80 for Walter Annexe, 1980). The symbols on the lower arc of the stamp indicates the caliber (7.7mm, 5.56mm or 7.62mm) and R# or R#M# indicate the model (R) and mark (M) of the cartridge, like the Commonwealth L#A# stamp (e.g., R1M1 is the first model and second Mark of a cartridge). Later, the 2-digit year is in the 12 o'clock position and a digit in the 6 o'clock position on the headstamp indicated the load identification code.

- A Factory A, Pretoria Metal Pressings. – Pretoria, South Africa.
- B Factory B, Pretoria Metal Pressings. – Kimberly, South Africa.
- LA Luther Annexe, Pretoria Metal Pressings. A factory named for Stephanus "'Fanie" Luther, a former PMP employee. Produced mostly civilian ammo, but there was some military production during high volume orders.
- WA Walter Annexe, Pretoria West factory, Pretoria Metal Pressings. – Pretoria, South Africa. A factory named for Allen Walter, a former PMP employee. Produced military ammo.
- PMP Pretoria Metal Pressings – A division of Denel Group.
- JMPD Pretoria Metal Pressings – A division of Denel Group. For Johannesburg Metropolitan Police Department (JMPD)

=== South Korea (37) ===
- KA Government Arsenal – Busan Metropolitan City, Republic of Korea. Manufactures military cartridges.
- PS Poong-San, Poongsan Corporation – Angang Ammunition Plant, Seoul, Republic of Korea. Manufactures military cartridges.
- PSD Poong-San Defense, Poongsan Corporation – Dongrae Ammunition Plant, Seoul, Republic of Korea. Manufactures military cartridges.
- PMC Precision Made Cartridges, Poongsan Corporation – Seoul, Republic of Korea. Manufactures commercial cartridges. The "M" in the headstamp looks like an upside-down "W".

=== Spain (33) ===
- ENSB, SB, or SB-T Empresa Nacional Santa Barbara de Industrias Militares ("Saint Barbara National Military Industries Enterprise") (?-2001); Toledo, Spain. Later absorbed as part of General Dynamics in 2001.
- FNP Fábrica Nacional de Palencia ("National Factory at Palencia"); Palencia, Spain. The FNP is at 12 o'clock and the 4-digit year is at 6 o'clock.
- FN T Fábrica Nacional de Toledo ("National Factory at Toledo"); Toledo, Spain. The factory is famous for making blades for swords, knives, bayonets and razors. Ammunition was made at a separate cartridge plant at the factory complex. The FN is at 12 o'clock and the T is at 6 o'clock; the first 2 digits of the year (19) were at 9 o'clock and the last 2 digits were at 3 o'clock. Later reorganized as Empresa Nacional Santa Bárbara de Industrias Militares, part of Santa Bárbara Sistemas.
- PS Pirotecnia Militar de Sevilla ("Military Explosives Factory at Seville"), Seville, Spain.
- SBS Santa Bárbara Sistemas ("Saint Barbara Systems") (2001–present); Toledo, Spain. The new name for Empresa Nacional Santa Barbara de Industrias Militares since it was absorbed by General Dynamics in 2001.

=== Sweden (65) ===
Amf stands for Ammunitionsfabrik ("Ammunition Factory"). They used a royal crown at the 12 o'clock position for government-manufactured or foreign-contracted ammunition; this was left blank if it was made by a private Swedish contractor. The 2-digit year is displayed at the 9 o'clock (tens) and 3 o'clock (ones) positions, and the contractor letter or number at the 6 o'clock position. Early ammunition had a 4-digit year with the first 2 digits (thousands and hundreds) at 9 o'clock and the second 2 digits (tens and ones) at 3 o'clock. Ammunition with an E at the 12 o'clock position (which stands for Ersättning, or "Substitute") have a bimetallic cartridge-case (brass-clad steel) due to wartime economy measures during World War II.

The component manufacturers were marked on the packaging. Kbr. stood for Karlsborg and Mbr. stood for Marieberg, the government ammunition factories. Åker or Åbr. stood for Åkers krutbruk, the government powdermill. Tillverkade ("assembled by") is the final manufacturer of the assembled cartridges; Krut ("gunpowder") is the propellant manufacturer, Hylsor ("cases") is the cartridge case manufacturer, Tändh ("primers") is the primer manufacturer, and Kulor ("balls") is the bullet manufacturer.

Parti ("Lot") is the Lot Number. The old method was made up of the 1-letter arsenal code (usually preceded by AMF), the lot number and 2-digit year of production, and the day and month of manufacture. (example: AMF K p3/43 2-3 is Amf Karlsborg - Lot #003 - 1943 - 2nd of March). The new method is made up of the 1-letter arsenal or 3-digit contractor code, 2-digit manufacturing year, and 3-digit (or larger) lot number, followed by the day and month of manufacture. (example: 02762614 24/08 is Amf 27 (ÅB Norma), 1962, Lot #614, 24th of August).

Foreign ammunition producers included Deutschen Waffen- und Munitionsfabrik (DWM) of Germany; Hirtenberger Patronen-, Zündhütchen- und Metallwarenfabrik A.G. (HP) and Keller & Co (KC or K&C) of Austria; Société Française des Munitions (SFM) of France; and Valtion Patruunatehdas (VPT) of Finland. The ammunition was repacked in Swedish-made packaging to keep the contractors anonymous.

Tändsticksfabrik means "Matchstick Factory". The government contracted match factories to manufacture gunpowder and pyrotechnic fillers like tracers. This was to prevent foreign supplies from being cut off due to embargo or war. It not only made Sweden self-sufficient but helped local industries by giving them government contracts.

Amf Codes

- K Amf Karlsborg (1870–?) – Karlsborg, Sweden. Factory originally founded inside the Karlsborg fortress in 1870, then transferred to an external factory complex (Vanäsverken) in 1887. The letter code on the packaging was Kbg.
- M Amf Marieberg (1876–1950) – Marieberg, Stockholm, Sweden. The ammunition factory was closed in 1950 and production was transferred to FFV Zakrisdalsverken in Karlstad. The letter code on the packaging was Mbg.
- H Hirtenberg bei Wien, Austria. Hirtenberg was home to a number of ammunition factories and Sweden had contracts with most of them. H is in the 12 o'clock position and the company headstamp (HP or KC) is at the 6 o'clock position.
- Z Zakrisdalsverken ("Zakrisdal Works") – Karlstad, Sweden. Export factory mark.
- 24 Norrhammars Bruk (AKA Husqvarna) – Norrhammars, Sweden. Only manufactured the brass cases.
- 25 Vulcans Tändsticksfabrik – Tidaholm, Sweden.
- 26, 026 ÅB Svenska Metallverken – Västerås, Sweden.
- 27, 027 ÅB Norma Projektilfabrik – Åmotfors, Sweden
- 28 Jönköpings Vestra Tändsticksfabrik – Jönköping, Sweden.
- 29 Valtion Patruunatehdas (VPT) – Finland. Only contracted for 6.5×55mm Swedish Mauser ammunition during World War II.
- 30 Deutschen Waffen- und Munitionsfabrik (DWM), Germany.
- 31 Svenska Tändsticks – Jönköping, Sweden.
- 32 Lidköpings Tändsticksfabrik – Lidköping, Sweden
- 33 Waffenwerke Brünn (1939–1945) – Povázská Bystrica, Czechoslovakia. Contracted with the German occupation owners of the Czech Brno plant. Only contracted for 7.92×57mm Mauser ammunition during World War II.
- 34 Jönköpings Tändsticksfabrik, Jönköping, Sweden.
- 35, 035 Svenska Metallverken (1954–1965) – Blikstorp, Sweden.
- 070 FFV Vanäsverken (AKA Nammo/Vanäsverken) – Vanäsverken, Karlsborg, Sweden.
- 071 FFV Zakrisdalsverken – Karlstad, Sweden.

Headstamps

- CG Carl Gustav Gevärsfaktori (1812–present) – Vanäsverken, Sweden. Reorganized and absorbed by FFV in 1943 and renamed FFV-Vanäsverken. Acquired by Bofors in 1991 as Bofors-Carl Gustav. Acquired by NAMMO Group in 1998 and renamed NAMMO Vanäsverken. Despite the name changes, the CG headstamp is still retained.
- FFV Förenede Fabriksverken (1943–1991) – Karlsborg, Sweden.
- N Nordiska Metallaktiebolaget – Västerås, Sweden. The N is at the 12 o'clock position, the 2-digit year is at the 9 o'clock (tens) and 3 o'clock (ones) positions, and the caliber is at the 6 o'clock position.
- NORMA ÅB Norma Projektilfabrik – Åmotfors, Sweden.

Foreign Contract Number Headstamps

- 434 Bakelittfabrikken (1946–present) – Aurskog, Norway. Acquired by the Nammo Group in 2005 and absorbed by Nammo Raufoss in 2017.
- 583 Raufoss Ammunisjonsfabrikk (AKA Nammo/Raufoss) – Raufoss, Norway.
- 586 Hirtenberger Patronenfabrik A.G. – Hirtenberg bei Wien, Austria
- 599 Diehl Wehrtechnik (a division of Diehl Stiftung) – Germany.
- 602 IVI Inc. (a division of SNC-Lavalin) – Saint-Gabriel-de-Valcartier, Canada. Only contracted for .50 BMG ammunition.
- 613 Companhia Brasileira de Cartuchos – Santo Andre, Brazil.
- 616 Winchester/Olin – East Alton, Illinois, USA.

=== Turkey (27) ===
- MKE – Makina ve Kimya Endüstrisi Kurumu (MKEK; "Mechanical and Chemical Industry Corporation") – Kırıkkale, Turkey. Its munitions are distributed in North America by Zenith Quest International (ZQI), which owns the commercial Guardian Ammunition (GA) brand. Military ammunition corporation.

== Warsaw Pact manufacturers (1955–1991) ==
=== Soviet Union ===
There wasn't a uniform headstamp marking system in use by Imperial Russia before 1908-15. Each arsenal had its own system.

Imperial Russian Letter Code System (1860s to 1928)

- П Factory "P" (St. Petersburg Cartridge Factory) (1869–1918) – Petrograd, Russia (city renamed Leningrad from 1924 to 1990). Headstamp originally had factory code letter "П" at 6 o'clock, 2-digit year at 12 o'clock, and Roman numeral for month of production (e.g., March = III, because March is the 3rd month) at 6 o'clock. The headstamp was changed over in 1914-15 to letter "П" over 2-digit year of production (e.g., 1914 = 14).
  Plant closed in 1918 and machinery moved to facilities in Simbirsk (renamed Ulyanovsk in 1924) and Podolsk.
- П ТУЛЬСКИЙ З (ПАТРОННЫЙ ТУЛЬСКИЙ ЗАВОД - P[atronnyy] Tul'skiy Z[avod] > "Tula Cartridge Factory") (1880–1908; 1908-1941) – Headstamp has the text "П ТУЛЬСКИЙ З" at 12 o'clock and the last three digits of the production year at 6 o'clock (e.g., 1907 AD = 907). Designated T (Factory "T") in 1908; headstamp changed over in 1908-09.
- T Factory "T" (Tula Cartridge Factory) (1880–1908; 1908–1941) – Tula, Tula Oblast, Russia. Designated Factory 38 in 1928. Headstamp has factory code letter or number at 12 o'clock and 2-digit year at 6 o'clock.
  Plant evacuated in 1941 and machinery moved to Yuryuzan, Chelyabinsk, Russia to new facility designated Factory 38.
- Л Factory "L" (Lugansk Cartridge Factory) (1895–1941) – Lugansk, Ukraine. Headstamp originally had factory code letter "Л" at 6 o'clock, 3-digit year at 12, and roman numeral for month of production at 6 o'clock. It was later standardized in 1914 to "Л" at 12 o'clock over 3-digit year (e.g., 1914 = 914) at 6 o'clock.
  Redesignated Factory 60 in 1928. Plant evacuated in 1941 and machinery moved to Frunze, Khirgizia, Russia to new facility designated Factory 60.
- C Factory "S" (Simbirsk Cartridge Factory) (1916–1924) – Simbirsk (town renamed Ulyanovsk in 1924), Russia. Briefly redesignated Factory "U" from 1925 to 1927.
- У Factory "U" (Ulyanovsk Cartridge Factory) (1925–1927) – Ulyanovsk, Ulyanovsk Oblast, Russia. Redesignated ЗВ ("ZV", Zavod Volodarskogo) in 1928.
- ЗВ (Factory "ZV", Zavod Volodarskogo > "Factory [named for] Volodarsky") (1928 to 1941) – Ulyanovsk, Russia. Redesignated Factory 3 in 1928 but used the ЗВ ("ZV") headstamp until 1942.
- П Factory "P" (Podolsk Cartridge Factory) (1920 to 1927) – Podolsk, Moscow, Russia. Initial headstamp used in 1920 was first ППЗ ("PPZ") and later ПП ("PP") for Podolskiy Patronnyj Zavod ("Podolsk Cartridge Factory"). Changed to П (Factory "P") in 1921 and redesignated Factory 17 in 1928. Plant evacuated in 1941 and its machinery moved to Barnaul, Altai Krai, Russia.
- X (Factory "H", Хиртенбeргер > "Hirtenberger", Hirtenberger Patronenfabrik) – Hirtenberg, Austria. Contract ammunition made by Hirtenberger for Russia in 1905, 1906 and 1909.

Soviet Russian Number Code System (1928 to 1990s)

The headstamp is the factory code number at 12 o'clock and the last two digits of the year of manufacture at 6 o'clock.

- 3 Factory 3 (Ulyanovsk Machinery Plant) (1942–2005) – Ulyanovsk, Ulyanovsk Oblast, Privolzhsky federalny okrug ("Volga Federal District"), Russia. Owned the Sapsan (Sapsan > "Peregrine Falcon") ammunition brand. It was absorbed by the Tula Cartridge Plant in 2005.
- 7 Factory 7 (Amursk Machine-Building Plant) – Amursk, Khabarovsk Krai, Russia. Later reorganized in 1976 as Vympel State Production Association (Vympel > "Pennant"). They manufacture 5.45×39mm Soviet, 5.56×45mm NATO, 7.62×39mm Soviet, and 9×19mm Parabellum ammunition and own the Golden Tiger ammunition brand.
- 10 Factory 10 (Unknown) (1944–1946) – Manufactured ammunition during World War 2. Closed after the war and records lost.
- 17 Factory 17 (Barnaul Cartridge Works) (1927–present) – Barnaul, Krasnogorsky District, Altai Krai, Russia. They own the Barnaul, Bear, and Centaur ammunition brands and produce the Monarch ammunition brand for Academy Sports.
- 38 Factory 38 (Tula Cartridge Plant – 1930's-1941) – Tula, Tula Oblast, Russia. Plant closed in 1941 and the factory's machinery and staff were moved to a new facility in Yuryuzan.
  - 38 Factory 38 (Yuryuzan State Factory – 1942–1991) – Yuryuzan, Chelyabinsk Oblast, Russia.
- 44 Factory 44 – Moscow, Russia. Laboratory used to produce experimental munitions.
- 46 Factory 46 (Kuntsevsk Cartridge Works) (?-1941) – Kuntsevsk, Russia. Plant closed in 1941 and the factory's machinery and staff were moved to a new facility in Sverdlovsk designated Factory 46.
  - 46 Factory 46 (Sverdlovsk Cartridge Works) (1942-?) – Sverdlovsk, Sverdlovsk Oblast, Ural, Russia.
- 54 Factory 54 – Nytva, Nytvensky District, Perm, Russia.
- 60, BMZ Factory 60 (Frunze Cartridge Plant) (1942–1991) – Bishkek, Kyrgyzstan (formerly Frunze, Kirghizia). After independence in 1991, the factory was nationalized and renamed Bishkek Mashinostroitel'nyy Zavod (BMZ, or "Bishkek Machine-Building Plant").
- 184 Factory 184 – Kazan, Tatar Autonomous Soviet Socialist Republic, Russia.
- 187 Factory 187 (Tula Cartridge Plant) – Tula, Tula Oblast, Russia. This second ammunition plant to be built in Tula was refounded between 1942 and 1944. It manufactured small arms ammunition. The Cyrillic headstamp ТПЗ (TPZ, for Tulski Patronyj Zavod, Russian > "Tula Cartridge Works") was used on military ammunition and TCW was used on commercial and hunting ammunition. It owns the TulAmmo trademark.
- 188 Factory 188 (Klimovsk Cartridge Plant) (1936–1941) – Klimovsk, Podolsk Urban Okrug, Moscow Oblast, Russia. Opened as Factory 188 in Klimovsk in December 1936. Plant closed in 1941 and the factory's machinery and staff were moved to a new facility in Novosibirsk designated Factory 188.
  - 188 Factory 188 (Novosibirsk Low Voltage Equipment Plant) (1941–present) – Novosibirsk, Novosibirsk Oblast, Siberian Federal District, Russia. Reorganized as the Novosibirsk Cartridge Plant in 1993. Owns the LVE ("Low Voltage Equipment") ammunition brand.
- 270, ЛПЗ (LPZ), LU, LCW Factory 270 (Lugansk Cartridge Works) (1943–present) – Luhansk (formerly Lugansk), Luhansk Oblast, Ukraine. The second Lugansk ammunition plant was founded in 1943. The 270 headstamp was used on military ammunition from 1943 to 2008 and ЛПЗ (LPZ, for Luganskij Patronnyj Zavod, Russian > "Lugansk Cartridge Works") from 2008 to present. The LU headstamp (for Luhansk, Ukraine) was used on commercial and contract ammunition for Red Army Standard. The LCW headstamp has been used since 2002 on exported ammunition.
- 304 Factory 304 (Kuntsevo Cartridge Works) – Kuntsevo District, Zapadny Administrative Okrug, Moscow, Russia. This second ammunition plant to be built in Kuntsevo was refounded between 1942 and 1944. Kuntsevo was integrated as part of Moscow in 1960.
- 529 Factory 529 (Novaya Lyalya Cartridge Works) – Novaya Lyalya, Novolyalinsky District, Sverdlovsk Oblast, Russia.
- 539 Factory 539 (Tula Cartridge Plant) (1942/1944–present) – Tula, Tula Oblast, Russia. Factory closed and its machinery moved in 1941 but was refounded in 1942/1944.
- 540 Factory 540 – Irkutsk, Irkutsk Oblast, Siberia, Russia.
- 541 Factory 541 (Chelyubinsk Cartridge Works) – Chelyabinsk, Chelyabinsk Oblast, Russia.
- 543 Factory 543 – Kazan, Tatar Autonomous Soviet Socialist Republic, Russia.
- 544 Factory 544 – Glazov, Udmurt Autonomous Soviet Socialist Republic, Russia.
- 545 Factory 545 – Chkalov, Chkalov Oblast, Russia.
- 710 Factory 710 (Podolsk Cartridge Works) – Podolsk, Podolsk Urban Okrug, Moscow Oblast, Russia. This second ammunition plant to be built in Podolsk was refounded between 1942 and 1944.
- 711 Factory 711 (Klimovsk Stamping Plant) (1942/1944-?) – Klimovsk, Podolsk Urban Okrug, Moscow Oblast, Russia. This second ammunition plant to be built in Klimovsk was refounded between 1942 and 1944.

=== Albania (59) ===
The headstamp used the reverse of the regular ComBloc headstamp code, with the "3" at 6 o'clock and the two-digit year at 12 o'clock. The country was informally allied with China from 1961 and formally withdrew from the Warsaw Pact in 1968. Most of the ammunition used by the Albanian armed forces was imported from China, as it was better quality and cheaper than domestic production. From 2001 to 2017 it has been involved in disposing of both domestic and foreign munitions for the UN and NATO.

- 1 Uzina Mekanike (UM) Gramsh ("Engineering Factory" in Gramsh) (1962–present) – Gramsh, Elbasan county, central region, Albania. Armory.
- 2 Uzina e Lëndëve Plasëse (ULP) Mjekës ("Factory for Explosive Materials" in Mjekës) (1962–present) – Mjekes, Shirgjan municipality, Elbasan county, central region, Albania. Explosives factory.
- 3 Kombinati Mekanik (KM) Poliçan ("Industrial Combine" in Poliçan) (1962–present) – Poliçan, Berat County, southern region, Albania. Munitions factory. Was privatized in 2006.

=== Bulgaria (50) ===
Bulgaria is now a NATO member. It often manufactures ammunition for other NATO partners.

- ((10)) Factory 10 (1947–present) – Kazanlak, Bulgaria. Manufactured ammunition and clips. A double ring was added around the number so that it would not be confused with the defunct Russian Factory 10 ammo plant. It was named the Universal Industrial Plant "Friedrich Engels" from 1964 to 1977 and the Машиностроителен Комбинат «Фридрих Енгелс» (Mashinostroitelen Kombinat "Fridrikh Engels", "Fridrikh Engels" Machine-Building Combine) from 1977 to 1989. It was privatized as Arsenal JSCo in 1989.
- Д В Ф (DVF) Durjavna Voenna Fabrika ("State Military Factory") (1924–1947) – Kazanlak, Bulgaria. Manufactured ammunition and explosives. Also started manufacturing commercial and agricultural products from 1944 onwards. The headstamp had Д ("D") at 9 o'clock, В ("V") at 12 o'clock, and Ф ("F") at 3 o'clock, with the 2-digit year at 6 o'clock. The Cyrillic alphabet headstamp has mistakenly been read as B or A B O because of mistranslation by collectors.

=== Czechoslovakia ===
Czechoslovakia declared independence from Austro-Hungary in 1918. It was divided into the Czech Republic and Slovakia in 1993.

Czechoslovakia – Pre-War (1918–1939)

- (M) Československé Muniční a Kovodělné Závody A.S. ("Czechoslovak Munitions and Metalworking Factories") (1934–1946) – Bratislava, Czechoslovakia (now Slovakia). The nationalized Georg Roth AG factory. The "M" headstamp is embossed in either a full- or half-circle.
- Ô / SB / Ô Sellier & Bellot – Vlašim, Prague, Czechoslovakia. Made percussion caps from 1825 and metal cartridges from 1870, beginning commercial hunting cartridge production in 1895. On the commercial ammunition headstamps the SB is at the 12 o'clock position. The "O"s (often referred to as "rosettes") are at the 3- and 9-o'clock positions, and the caliber is at 6 o'clock. (Pistol ammo usually had only one "rosette"). The "rosettes" (a reversed arrowhead superimposed atop a circle, representing a rifled gunbarrel) indicate the use of Neroxin non-corrosive primers, S&B's proprietary brand.
- S&B, SB Sellier & Bellot (1825–1936; 1983–present) – Prague, Czechoslovakia (now Czech Republic). On the headstamp the "S&B" is at the 12 o'clock position. Military ammunition had the 4-digit year of production split between 9 o'clock and 3 o'clock (e.g., 19 and 38 for 1938), and the factory code letter at 6 o'clock. When Riga, the last of its satellite factories, was sold off in 1937 the unified factory code letters SBP were placed at 12 o'clock and the quadrant at 6 o'clock were replaced with the month of production in Roman numerals (e.g., VI for June, the sixth month). The headstamp was changed back to S&B in 1983.
  - SBP, SB / P Sellier & Bellot – Prague (1936–1939; 1939–46; 1946?–1983) – Prague, Czechoslovakia. Manufacturing moved to Vlasim in the mid-1930s (starting up in 1936) but the international headquarters remained in Prague. The civilian headstamp has the "SBP" at 12 o'clock and the caliber at 6 o'clock. On the military headstamp the "SB" is at 12 o'clock and the "P" is at 6 o'clock.
  - SBR, SB / R Sellier & Bellot – Riga (1884–1937; 1937–1940; 1940–1941 & 1944–1946) – Krusenhof, Riga, Latvia. A satellite factory set up for sales to Northern Europe and the Baltic region. The civilian headstamp has the "SBR" at 12 o'clock and the caliber at 6 o'clock. On the military headstamp the "SB" is at 12 o'clock and the "R" is at 6 o'clock. It manufactured 7,92mm Mauser and .303 British military ammunition because most of the regional powers used either captured German or Austrian war surplus or British military aid. It was bought out in 1937 by Vairogs (Latvian > "Shield"), a Latvian train-car manufacturing company (formerly Fenikss (Latvian > "Phoenix") until 1936) that had diversified into automobile production. Vairogs used a stylized "V" as its headstamp from 1937 to 1940. It was later seized and nationalized by the Soviet Union in 1940 and renamed Factory 520 (with "520" as its headstamp). It manufactured 7.62×54mmR M91 Russian rifle ammunition until the machinery was evacuated to Sverdlovsk in 1941. It was returned in 1944/1945 and briefly was in operation until 1946. The facility was then repurposed into a train car factory.
  - SBS, SB / S Sellier & Bellot – Schönebeck (1829–1922) – Schönebeck, Germany. A satellite factory set up initially for production of mercury fulminate. This was due to pollution restrictions placed on the Prague site until 1841. The civilian headstamp has the "SBS" at 12 o'clock and the caliber at 6 o'clock. On the military headstamp the "SB" is at 12 o'clock and the "S" is at 6 o'clock. Sold to the Steyr-Werke A.G. of Vienna, Austria in 1922.
  - SB / Schönebeck, P69 Sellier & Bellot – Schönebeck (1922–1945) – Schönebeck, Germany. The "SB" was at 12 o'clock and the text for Schönebeck occupied the lower half of the headstamp. The month of production was on the left of the SB and the two-digit year was to the right. Production was initially by Steyr-Werke A.G. and a group of other Austrian investors. It was eventually bought out by senior investor Fritz Mandl of Hirtenberger A.G. in 1930. The plant was confiscated from Mandl by the German government in 1933 because he was a Jew. It was then owned by IG Farben from 1933 to 1945, and used the headstamp P-code "P69" for military ammunition.

Czechoslovakia – German Occupation (1939–1945)

- ak Munitionsfabriken (vormals Sellier & Bellot, Prag – Fabrik in Wlaschim) (1939–1945) – Vlašim, Czechoslovakia. Sellier & Bellot cartridge factory.
- dou Waffenwerke Brünn A.-G., Werk Povázská Bystrica (1939–1945) – Považská Bystrica, Czechoslovakia. Brno Arsenal.

Czechoslovakia – Cold War (1945–1990)
7,62–43 (1953–1990s) = Crate marking indicating 7.62×39mm M43 Soviet (7,62mm vz. 43). Introduced around 1953.
7,62–59 (1959–1990s) = Crate marking indicating 7.62×54mmR M91 Russian (7,62mm vz. 59). Replaced the 7.92mm Mauser round in 1959.

- PS Povazske Strojarne ("Factory at Povazska") (1946–1952) – Považská Bystrica, Czechoslovakia (now Slovakia). The renamed National Ammunition Plant after its move from Bratislava.
- SBP ("Sellier & Bellot at Prague") (1946?-1983) – Sellier & Bellot's commercial headstamp for civilian sales and European exports. The original S&B headstamp was reintroduced for commercial sales in 1983.
- UX, UXA (1946–1949) – Unknown location. Sterile ammunition provided to communist clients like the early Israeli state (c.1947–1948). Spurious headstamp dates are 4, 44, and 45 – making it look like they were made during the latter days of the German occupation (1939–1945).
- ZV Zbrojova Vlašim ("Vlašim Armory") (1945–1983) – Vlašim, Czechoslovakia. Zbrojova Vlašim was the nationalized name for the former Sellier & Bellot plant in Vlasim and was used for military export.
- aym Povazske Strojarne (1952–1998) – Považská Bystrica, Horné Považie region, Czechoslovakia. Used for internal Warsaw Pact sales.
- bxn Zbrojova Vlašim – Vlašim, Central Bohemia region, Czechoslovakia. Used for internal Warsaw Pact sales. Now used for military munitions sales.
- czo Zbrojova Vsetín – Vsetín, Zlín region, Czechoslovakia. Used for internal Warsaw Pact sales.

=== East Germany ===
VEB stands for Volkseigener Betrieb (literally "People's Own Enterprise"), a state-owned or nationalized business. Headstamps were Warsaw Pact standard, with the contractor code at 12 o'clock and 2-digit year at 6 o'clock; brass-cased ammunition (Messing Hulse or Ms-Hulse) had an asterisk at 3 o'clock. Lots were made in blocks of 10; the first number before the slash was the sub-lot (1-10) and the number before the slash was the number of lots (1/9 is the 9th sub-lot of Lot 1).

- 04 VEB Mechanische Werkstätten Königswartha ("Mechanical Workshops" at Königswartha) – Königswartha, Bezirk Dresden, East Germany. An ammunition factory that made 9×19mm Parabellum (9mm P-08), 7,92×57mm Mauser (7,92mm Patr.), 7.92×33mm Kurz (7,92mm Patr.-Kz 43) and 7.62×39mm M43 Soviet (7.62mm Patr. M43) ammo.
- 05 VEB Spreewerk Lübben – Lübben, Bezirk Cottbus, East Germany. The nationalized BKIW arsenal. It made 9×19mm Parabellum (9mm P-08), 7,92×57mm Mauser (7,92mm Patr.), 7.92×33mm Kurz (7,92mm Patr.-Kz 43), 5.45×39mm M74 Soviet (5.45mm Patr. M74) and 7.62×39mm M43 Soviet (7.62mm Patr. M43) ammo.
- 201 VEB Sprengstoffwerk I (Schönebeck/Elbe) ("Explosives Factory #1 at Schönebeck on the Elbe) (1951?–1990) – Schönebeck, Saxony-Anhalt, East Germany. Made sporting rimfire and shotshell cartridges and recycled centerfire ammo cases as blanks.

=== Yugoslavia ===
- 11 Enterprise 11 (Prvi Partizanski zavod ad Uzice) (1948–1956) – Uzice, Yugoslavia (now Serbia). Cover headstamp briefly used for ППУ from 1948? to 1956?. Cartridge headstamp had the code number at 12 o'clock, 5-point Communist Stars at 9 o'clock and 3 o'clock, and the 2-digit year of production at 6 o'clock.
- 12 Enterprise 12 (Igman zavod ad Konjic) (1952–1955) – Konjic, Yugoslavia (now Bosnia-Herzegovina). Cover headstamp briefly used for ИК from 1952? to 1955?. Cartridge headstamp had the code number at 12 o'clock, 5-point Communist Stars at 9 o'clock and 3 o'clock, and the 2-digit year of production at 6 o'clock.
- A Т Ӡ (A T Z) Artiljerijsko Tehnički Institut ("Artillery Technical Institute") (1853-?) – Kragujevac, Yugoslavia (now Serbia). A cannon foundry and pyrotechnics laboratory founded in 1853. In 1883 the laboratory was spun off to form Vojno Tehnicki Zavod, which concentrated on munitions and pyrotechnics. The headstamp had the A at 9 o'clock, T at 12 o'clock and Ӡ at 3 o'clock, with the two-digit year at 6 o'clock.
- В Т Ӡ (V T Z) Vojno Tehnički Zavod ("Military Technical Institute") (1883–1941; 1944–1992) – Kragujevac, Yugoslavia (now Serbia). A factory that manufactured munitions and pyrotechnics from 1883 to 1941. The headstamp wasn't changed from AТӠ to ВТӠ until 1932. Production was halted during World War II from 1941 to 1944 due to the German occupation and again briefly in 1991 during the Yugoslavian Civil War. It is now focused on artillery ammunition and explosives manufacture. The headstamp had the В at 9 o'clock, T at 12 o'clock and Ӡ at 3 o'clock, with the two-digit year at 6 o'clock.
- ИК (IK) Igman zavod ad Konjic ("Igman Factory at Konjic") – Konjic, Yugoslavia (now Bosnia-Herzegovina).
- ППУ (PPU) Prvi Partizanski zavod ad Užice ("First Partisan" Ammunition Plant) (1945–present) – Užice, Yugoslavia (now Serbia).
- ЕИГН (EIGN) – Unknown Factory. Headstamp had the code letters at 12 o'clock and the 2-digit year of production at 6 o'clock.
- МБЛ (MBL) Milan Blagojevic namenska ad Lucani ("Milan Blajojevic dedicated [plant] at Lucani") (1949–present) – Lucani, Moravica, Yugoslavia (now Serbia). Specialized chemical plant that manufactures propellants, primers, and explosives. It is named after Serbian partisan and war hero Milan Blagojević (also written as Milan Blagojev or Miloje Blagojevic). The МБЛ acronym is often found as the propellant supplier on the cartridge packaging.
- РКI (RK-1) ~~Rezervisani Kapacitet No.1? (Reserve Capacity #1)~~ – Unknown factory. Might be a cover headstamp for Fabryka «Suvenir».
- СМБ (SMB) Fabryka «Suvenir» (Factory "Souvenir") (1981–present) – Samokov, Makedonski Brod, Poreče, Yugoslavia (now Republic of North Macedonia). Arms and ammunition factory that also mints all of North Macedonia's coinage. They made 9mm Parabellum, 7.62mm M43 Soviet, and 7,9mm Mauser ammunition and repaired small arms. From 2005 to 2009 it was owned by Greek munitions manufacturer Olympic Arms S.A., but no ammunition was manufactured. From 2009 they were bought out by the Czech firm Real Trade Praha A.S. and were renamed '«Suvenir» Metal Products Equipment'. They own the SUMBRO ammunition brand (which stands for «Suvenir», Makedonski Brod). Currently they are owned by Ammunition Technology Services (ATS). They currently (as of 2022) manufacture 9mm Parabellum, 5.56mm NATO, 7.62mm M43 Soviet, 7.62mm NATO, 12.7mm NATO and 12.7mm M35 Soviet ammunition.

== Caribbean manufacturers ==
=== Cuba ===
The Spanish government ran a munitions plant in Havana.

- P M H Pirotecnia Militar de La Habana ("Military Pyrotechnic Factory at Havana") (1870s?-1901)- Loma de Arostegui, Havana, Cuba. The raised headstamp has the P at 9 o'clock, the M at 12 o'clock, the H at 3 o'clock, and the two digit year of production at 6 o'clock. It manufactured black powder .58 Spanish Berdan Carbine, .43 Spanish Remington, and .43 Spanish Remington Reformed cartridges. It was closed in 1901 and converted into the new campus for the University of Havana in May, 1902.

Early Communist ammunition didn't use a headstamp code until the late 1970s.

- 13 (1980s – 2012) – La Campana, Hoyo de Manicaragua, Villa Clara Province, Cuba. Headstamps date from the early 1980s.
- PMV Pirotecnia Militar de Las Villas (1970s – 1980s) – La Campana, Hoyo de Manicaragua, Las Villas Province, Cuba. Headstamps date from the late 1970s. Las Villas Province was split into 3 smaller provinces in 1976: Cienfuegos, Sancti Spíritus and Villa Clara.
- EMI Empresa Militar Industrial "Comandante Ernesto Che Guevara" ("Military-Industrial Enterprise «Commander Ernesto Che Guevara»") (2012-Present) – La Campana, Manicaragua, Villa Clara Province, Cuba. New machinery is to be provided by KBAL, a division of the Klimovsk Cartridge Plant, Rosoboronexport.

=== Dominican Republic ===
- R D República Dominicana (Armeria F.A. San Cristobal, "Army Armory at San Cristobal") (1947-1968) – San Cristobal, Dominican Republic. The armory was set up in 1947. After Trujillo's assassination in 1961, the armory gradually wound down production and was then closed. The first headstamp (1954-1959) has the "R" at 9 o'clock, "D" at 3 o'clock, cartridge designation (e.g., .30 M1) at 12 o'clock, and 2-digit year of production at 6 o'clock. The simplified second headstamp (1959-1962) deleted the "R" and "D".

== South American manufacturers ==
=== Argentina (29) ===
- AEL Arsenal Esteban de Luca (“Arsenal «Esteban De Luca»”) (1918-1931) - Parque Patricios, Buenos Aires, Argentina.
- APG Arsenal Principal de Guerra de Buenos Aires (“Main War Arsenal of Buenos Aires”) (1896-1918) - Buenos Aires, Argentina.
- FLB, FM"FLB" Fábrica Militar 'Fray Luís Beltran' ("Military Factory – 'Friar Louis Beltran'") (1961–present) – San Lorenzo, Argentina. A military supply and ammunition factory named after the friar who helped create the first armory and cannon foundry during the Spanish American wars of independence. The headstamp has the caliber on the upper arc. The lower arc contains the factory's initials flanked by the two-digit month on the left side and the last two digits of the production year on the right side (e.g., 03FLB82 means March-Fabrica Militar Fray Luis Beltran-1982).
- FM Fabrica de Munición para Armas Portátiles ("Small Arms Munitions Factory") (1935–1937) – San Lorenzo, Argentina. A military cartridge factory that was originally on the grounds of the San Lorenzo Arsenal cantonment. It was built between 1933 and 1935 with machinery and technical aid from Fritz Werner Manufacturing. It was separated into its own facilities in 1936 and was made part of the Dirección de Fabricas Militares del Ejercito Argentino ("Argentinean Army – Directorate of Military Manufacturing"). Its name was changed to Fabrica Militar de Municion de Armas Portatiles de Puerto Borghi in 1937.
- FMC-SL Fábrica Militar de Cartuchos de San Lorenzo ("Military Cartridge Factory at San Lorenzo") (1950–1955) – San Lorenzo, Argentina.
- FMSL Fábrica Militar de San Lorenzo (1955–1961) – A merger of the Fábrica Militar de Cartuchos de San Lorenzo and Fabrica Militar de Munición de Artillería. The previous name of Fábrica Militar Fray Luís Beltran.
- SF, FMSF Fábrica Militar de Cartuchos de San Francisco ("Military Cartridge Factory at San Francisco") (?-1991) – San Francisco, Córdoba, Argentina. Headstamp has the metric caliber at 12 o'clock, manufacturer code FMSF at 10 o'clock, Lot number at 6 o'clock, and year of production at 4 o'clock. Factory was privatized in 1990 and was closed in 1996.
- FMMAP-B Fabrica [Argentina] Militar de Municion de Armas Portatiles de Puerto Borghi ("Military Light Arms Munitions Factory at Puerto Borghi") (1937–1950) – Puerto Borghi, San Lorenzo, Argentina.
- FMMAP-DM Fabrica Militar de Municion de Armas Portátiles "Domingo Matheu" de Rosario ("Military Factory for Light Arms Munitions – 'Domingo Matheu' at Rosario") (1942-?) – Rosario, Santa Fe, Argentina.
- FMMAP-SF Fabrica [Argentina] Militar de Municion de Armas Portatiles de San Francisco ("Military Factory for Light Arms Ammunition at San Francisco") – San Francisco, Córdoba, Argentina.
- IMPA Industrias Metalúrgicas y Plásticas Argentina ("Metallurgical and Plastic Industries of Argentina") (1928–present) – barrio de Almagro, Buenos Aires, Argentina. The co-operative briefly made cartridge cases for the military.
- ORBEA Cartucheria Orbea (1906-?) – Buenos Aires, Argentina. Private Spanish ammunition manufacturer (Orbea Hermanos y Cía.) originally headquartered in Eibar, Spain.

=== Brazil (19) ===
- CBC Companhia Brasileira de Cartuchos – Ribeirão Pires, São Paulo, Brazil.
- R Fábrica de Cartuchos do Realengo ("Cartridge factory at Realengo") (1898-1977) - Realengo, Rio de Janeiro, Brazil. A government factory set up to manufacture 7mm Mauser ammunition for use with Brasil's Mauser rifles. With the adoption of new standard cartridges, IMBEL closed the factory and moved the machinery to their campus.
  The headstamp has 5-pointed stars at 10-, 2- and 6-o'clock, the digit of the month at 7 o'clock (e.g., 1 = January, 11 = November), and the 2-digit year at 5 o'clock (1898 = 98).

=== Chile (52) ===
- F. FÁbricas y MAestranzas del Ejército (FAMAE) ("Factories and Workshops of the Army") – Santiago, Chile.

=== Colombia (80) ===
- INDUMIL, IM Industria Militar ("Colombian Military Industry") (1954–present) – Bogotá, Colombia.

=== Paraguay ===
- F D FAMAE & DIMABEL. Made in Chile by FAMAE for the Paraguayan Armed Forces' Armaments Directorate (Direccion de Material Belico – DIMABEL).
  NOTE: On its headstamp, F is in the 9 o'clock position and D is in the 3 o'clock position; the 2-digit year is at the 6 o'clock position and the metric caliber (7.62×51mm, 9×19mm) is at the 12 o'clock position.
- IMP Industrias Militares de Paraguay ("Military Industries of Paraguay"), a division of DIMABEL – Piribebuy, Paraguay (1988–1993; 1995–present). Originally set up with Fabrique National equipment and assistance; reformed and reorganized with help from FAMAE from 1993 to 1995. It manufactures small arms ammunition and owns the Yaguareté (Guarani > "Jaguar") civilian ammo brand.
- ##MDRP Ministerio de Defencia, Republica Del Paraguay ("Ministry of Defense, Republic of Paraguay"). Made in France by Gevelot / Société Française des Munitions and in Israel by IMI, supposedly for the Paraguayan military. Some ammunition with this headstamp was seized before it could be diverted to South Africa in violation of the arms embargo. Headstamp has the 2-digit year of production in front of it. Gevelot-made ammunition was Berdan-primed and IMI-made ammunition was Boxer-primed.

=== Venezuela ===
- CAVIM Compañía Anónima Venezolana de Industrias Militares ("Venezuelan Military Industries, Ltd.") – Caracas. (1975–present) The headstamp follows ComBloc pattern with CAVIM at 6 o'clock and the 2-digit year of production at 12 o'clock. The headquarters is in Caracas, the Armament and Munitions Factory is in Maracay, and the Chemical Plant is in Morón.
  - OP Codigo DAEX del Organismos Policiales ("DAEX Code for the Police Organizations") = A code number assigned by DAEX that is placed on the headstamp of police-issue ammunition to indicate which organization it was issued. It is designed to prevent pilferage and black market arms proliferation. On the headstamp, the manufacturer code (CAVIM) is at 12 o'clock, the OP code (example OP:35) is at 6 o'clock, and the 2-digit year of production is at 3 o'clock.
- VEN Ministerio de la Defensa, Servicio de Armamento, Arsenal y Fábrica de Municiones ("Ministry of Defense, Armaments Service, Arsenal and Munitions Factory") – Caracas, Venezuela. This headstamp was used on military ammunition that had been imported from Fabrique Nationale.

== African manufacturers ==
=== Burkina Faso ===
- SIVAM Societe Industrielle Voltaique d'Armes et Munitions ("Voltaic Industrial Society for Arms and Munitions") – Ouagadougou, Burkina Faso (formerly Upper Volta).

=== Cameroon ===
- MANUCAM Manufacture Camerounaise de Munition ("Cameroonian Munitions Factory") - Cameroon. A government-owned cartridge factory that made 7.62mm NATO ammo.

=== Ethiopia ===
The first domestic ammunition plant was set up by Emperor Menelik II in 1911. It made 10.75mm M1870 Russian Berdan Mk.2 and 7.62mm M1891 Russian Mosin-Nagant cartridges. Ethiopia had long economic ties to Czechoslovakia dating back to the early 20th Century. An ammunition plant was set up by the Czechs in the reign of Empress Zäwditu in the 1920s that produced 7.92mm Mauser cartridges for the new Czech weapons it was importing. A new Czech plant was set up around 1947 to 1953 CE with assistance from the Považské Strojárne factory and was named after the contemporary ruler, Emperor Haile Selassie I. It made 7.92mm Mauser, .30-06 Springfield, and 7.62mm NATO ammunition for the military and .303 British rifle ammunition for the civilian market. Packaging lists the date in the Ethiopian calendar year (7 to 8 years less than that of the Gregorian calendar), while the cartridge headstamp uses the Common Era year.

- ቀኃሥ ("Qä. Ha. Sə.") Emperor Haile Selassie I Ammunition Factory (c.1950–1974) – Mexico Square, Addis Ababa, Ethiopia. The packaging is labeled in Amharic and is stamped on the inner packaging with ink. The headstamp has the phonetic Amharic initials of the factory name at 12 o'clock, six-pointed stars at 3- and 9 o'clock (the downward-pointing triangles are so small and faint that the stars sometimes look like single large upward-pointing triangles), and the 4-digit Common Era year at 6 o'clock. From the late 1960s to 1974 the caliber of the cartridges (7.92, .30, and 7.62) were shown to the right of the 2-digit year.
- መ ኢ ድ ("Mä. Lī. Də.") Hibret Manufacturing and Machine Building Industry, Department of Defence Industry (1974–1987?) – Mexico Square, Addis Ababa, Ethiopia. The factory was renamed after Emperor Haile Selassie was deposed in 1974. Its light ammunition production lines were later moved to the Homicho plant in Ambo. The headstamp is similar, except the six-pointed stars are more defined and the Common Era year only uses the last 2 digits.
- ? Homicho Ammunition Engineering Industry plant (1987–Present) – Ambo, Ethiopia. An ammunition plant set up with Soviet and North Korean assistance. It makes 7.62mm M43 Soviet, 7.62mm M91 Russian, 12.7mm ComBloc, and 14.5mm ComBloc ammunition. Packaging is labeled in English and is stamped with blue ink on the white cardboard cartons. Export ammunition is made without a headstamp and has been found in Sudan, South Sudan, Somalia, the Central African Republic, and Libya.

=== Kenya ===
- K O F (Kenya Ordnance Factories Corporation) (1995–present) – Eldoret, Kenya. Set up by FN-Herstal between 1988 and 1995. It manufactures 9×19mm Parabellum, 5.56×45mm NATO, and 7.62×51mm NATO. NOTE: Headstamp is "K" at 9 o'clock, "O" at 12 o'clock, "F" at 3 o'clock, and 2-digit year at 6 o'clock.

=== Namibia ===
Namibia has ties to both North and South Korea dating back to 1990; SWAPO had connections to North Korea dating back to the 1970s. North Korean technical support and labor was used in 2005 to build army barracks at Suiderhof military base, a military school and museum at Okahandja, a new Ministry of Defense headquarters, and an expansion of the munitions plant in Leopard Valley. A munitions and explosives complex was built in 2010 in Oamites, a disused copper mine.

- ? (2005–present) – Oamites, Windhoek, Khomas, Namibia.

=== Nigeria ===
Nigeria produces its own .303 British, 7.62×51mm NATO, and 9×19mm Parabellum cartridges. The cartridges are made using ammunition equipment sold by Fritz Werner Manufacturing, which is why the headstamp's font and markings look German-made. .303 British was phased out for 7.62mm NATO since the mid-1960s and is now sold as a hunting and sporting cartridge. 12 gauge shotgun shells are sold to civilians for hunting. 7.62×39mm Soviet production will supplement (or could even replace) 7.62mm NATO in the near future. The headstamps have 3-letter codes (OFN and AFN) but the packaging has 2-letter codes (OF or AF).

- AFN Ammunition Factory of Nigeria (1986–present) – Kaduna, Nigeria.
- OFN Ordnance Factory of Nigeria (1964–1986) – Kaduna, Nigeria. The Defence Industries Corporation of Nigeria (DICoN) was set up by Act of Parliament in 1964. The Ordnance Factory was designed, laid-out, and set up within the year by Fritz Werner Manufacturing. After the end of the Nigerian Civil War (1967–1970), the factory diversified to produce civilian items like rural water supply equipment, industrial spare parts, and furniture.

=== Sudan ===
Kynoch helped the Sudanese government to set up a small arms factory that opened in 1956. They produced .303 British initially and later in 1959 produced 7.62×39mm Soviet. The headstamp uses Arabic language lettering and "Indian" (Arab-language) numbering. It was later placed under the control of the Military Industry Corporation in 1993.

- س ("S") Military Industry Corporation – Al Shajara ammunition plant, Al Shajara, Khartoum, Sudan. The Arabic "S" letter stands for Sudan (السودان, al-suwdan) or the Republic of the Sudan ( جمهورية السودان, jumhuriat al-suwdan). The early headstamps had a quadrant headstamp with the manufacturer code at 12 o'clock, 4-digit year of production at 3 o'clock, 1- or 2-digit month of production at 6 o'clock, and the caliber number in hundredths (i.e., .303) at 9 o'clock. In the 1970s they adopted a new three-part headstamp with the manufacturer's code at 12 o'clock, 1- or 2-digit month at 5 o'clock, and 2-digit year at 7 o'clock; it omits the caliber designation.

=== Zimbabwe ===
- Z28 Unknown factory – Zimbabwe.
- ZI Zimbabwe Defense Industries – Harare, Harare Province, Zimbabwe. Headstamp has the 2-digit production year at 12-o'clock and ZI at 6-o'clock. It sold surplus military ammunition under the civilian Cheetah brand through Vector Arms, Salt Lake City, Utah, USA from 1993 to 2005.

== Central Asian manufacturers ==
=== Azerbaijan ===
- 050 Factory 50 (Telemekhanika Zavodu = "Telemechanical Plant") (2006-Present) - Shirvan, Azerbaijan Republic. Former electronics manufacturing plant (1981-2006). It was transferred in 2006 to the control of the Ministry of Defence Industries and now manufactures ammunition. It owns the civilian Tela brand. It makes 7.62mm M43 Soviet and 5.45mm M74 Soviet cartridges and is developing 5.56mm NATO. Tela ammo is exported into the United States under the TelaAmmo USA brand by Tela-IMPEX LLC (2020-Present) of Hallandale Beach, FL.

=== Uzbekistan ===
- 601 Factory 601 (SUE SPA «Vostok») (2002 – ?) – Tashkent, Uzbekistan. Set up began after independence in 1998 – with full production commencing in 2002. The loading machinery was provided by Manhurin and the packing machinery was subcontracted out to a German firm. On the headstamp, the factory number "601" is at 12 o'clock, the 2-digit year of production is at 6 o'clock, and an eight-point star is at 9 o'clock. The ammo code letter is at 3 o'clock; this is in the Cyrillic alphabet for export within the former Soviet sphere and Warsaw Pact. Early test-batch cartridges were made with Latinate letters and might be used for domestic production (as Uzbekistan uses both alphabets) and commercial sales to Europe and the Americas. A ("A") stands for 7,62×39mm M43 Soviet and is packed in 30-round cartons. б ("B") stands for 7,62×54mmR M91 Russian and is packed in 20-round cartons. Ц ("C") stands for 5,45×39mm M74 Soviet and is packed in 30-round cartons. Д ("D") stands for 9×18mm Makarov and is packed in 16-round plastic trays in 16-round cartons. E ("E") stands for 9×19mm Parabellum and is packed in plastic trays in 90-round cartons (later reduced to a 50-round tray in 2021). The Vostok company logo on the packaging is a Cyrillic letter B ("V", for Vostok) with a shooting star in its stem. Some of its ammunition has been found in Sellier & Bellot packaging and sold in Europe. In 2021 it began exporting to the US through Tactical Sh*t of St. Peters, MO.

== East Asian manufacturers ==
=== China ===
NORINCO (North Industries Corporation – Beijing, People's Republic of China. Operates several state arsenals that produce weapons and munitions for both the military and civilian markets. Ammunition headstamp has the arsenal number at 12 o'clock and the last 2 digits of the year of manufacture at 6 o'clock. From 1912 to 1950 the communist Chinese used the Republican calendar, which numbered the years from the Xinhai Revolution of 1911 rather than the Western Anno Domini / Common Era. The following are arsenals known to exist before 1979.

- 11 State Factory 11 (1949?-Present) – Mudanjiang, Heilongjiang province, People's Republic of China. Previously was the Nationalist Arsenal 10 before 1949; received Factory Code 11 in 1952.
- 31 or 031 State Factory 31 (1953–present) –
- 41 State Factory 41 (1953–present) -
- 51 or 051 State Factory 51 (1953–present) -
- 61 State Factory 61 (Long Jiang Special Equipment Company, Ltd.) (1953–Present) – Harbin, Heilongjiang province, People's Republic of China.
- 71 State Factory 71 (1953–present) -
- 81 State Factory 81 (1953–present) -

Headstamps 1, 101, 111, 121, 131, 201, 211, 221, 141, 301, 311, 321 (1953-?), 351, 391, 501 / 0501, 651, 661 (1953-?), 821, 846, 911, 964, 6201, 6202, 6203, 9121, and 9141 are confirmed as Chinese, while 451, 671 and 946 are unconfirmed. They are either a subterfuge method to conceal the actual locations and numbers of Chinese arsenals (e.g., 946 as a cover headstamp for State Factory 964) or a designation for annexes attached to an arsenal (i.e., 311 is an annex of State Factory 11 or State Factory 31).

- 121 Heilongjiang North Tool Factory – Mudanjiang, Heilongjiang province, People's Republic of China.
- 451 & 456 Chung-Ching Arsenal - Chung Ching, People's Republic of China.
- 791 Changjiang Electric Industry Group Co., Ltd. – Chongqing independent municipality, (formerly part of Sichuan Province), People's Republic of China. The former Nationalist Arsenal 10 at Chongqing. It also uses the former Chongqing Arsenal "Double Ring" symbol on civilian sport ammunition.

=== Japan (30) ===
- P##S Showa Kinzoku Ltd. (a division of Nippon Oil & Fats Co. Ltd.) (1943–present) – Tokyo, Japan. The ## symbol stands for the last two digits of the year of manufacture (P54S would mean 1954 production). The P prefix stands for "Police" contract ammunition. It manufactured .38 Special cartridges for use with Police-issue Smith & Wesson and Colt revolvers.
- TE Toyo Seiki Manufacturing Company, Limited – Tokyo, Japan.
- TS or TOYO Toyo Seiki Manufacturing Company, Limited – Japan.

=== North Korea ===
- 93 Factory 93 – North Korea.

=== Taiwan (Republic of China) ===
Taiwanese dates are calculated from 1911, the year the KMT government came into power, rather than the Western Anno Domini (AD) / Common Era (CE) date system.

- 60A Arsenal 60.
- TAA 205th Arsenal, Material Production Center, Kaohsiung, Taiwan. A sub-contractor that manufactures 5.56mm NATO and 7.62mm NATO cartridges for General Dynamics.
- NPA (National Police Agency, Ministry of the Interior) Headstamp used on ammunition procured from foreign manufacturers. Headstamp is NPA at 10 o'clock followed by the two-digit year of manufacture at 2 o'clock (e.g., NPA 99).

== South-East Asian manufacturers ==
=== Cambodia ===
The Cambodian government usually imported its small arms ammunition, but briefly had a domestic ammunition plant from 1969 to 1970. Lon Nol's Khmer Republic received ammunition from its SEATO partners, like the United States and Australia. Communist Kampuchea received surplus ammunition from the Soviet Bloc and new-made ammunition from its sponsor China.

- "Cambodian Army Ammunition Plant" – Stung Chral, Cambodia. A deal was made in February, 1962 between the Cambodian government and the Czechoslovak firm of Sellier & Bellot to set up a cartridge factory to manufacture 9×19mm Parabellum, 7.5×54mm French, and 30-06 Springfield cartridges. Originally supposed to be completed by 1965, it didn't start production until 1969. The plant didn't use a headstamp code on their ammunition, but did use a contractor code of SC on the packaging. It was overrun by the Khmer Rouge in November 1970, damaged in the fighting, and then sabotaged by the retreating Khmer Rouge forces.

=== Indonesia (45) ===
- AD Pabrik Alat Peralatan TNI Angkatan Darat (Pabal AD, "Army Tool and Equipment Factory") (1958–1962) – Bandung, West Java, Indonesia. PSM was renamed to Pabrik Alat Peralatan Angkatan Darat (Pabal AD, "Army Tool and Equipment Factory") in 1958 and came under the control of the Army.
- PSM Pabrik Senjata dan Mesiu ("Weapons and Munitions Factory") (1950 to 1958) – Bandung, West Java, Indonesia. The Javanese name for the Dutch Leger Productie Bedrijven ("Military Production Facilities") (1947–1950) – ceded to Indonesia in 1950.
- P, PINDAD, or PIN PT. PINDAD (Persero) (1962–present) – Turen, Malang, East Java, Indonesia. Pabal AD (Pabrik Alat Peralatan TNI Angkatan Darat) was renamed PT. PINDAD (Perindustrian Angkatan Darat, "Army Industries") in 1962. PINDAD was briefly renamed KOPINDAD (Komando Perindustrian TNI, Angkatan Darat, "Army Industries Command") in 1972 but reverted to PINDAD in 1976. It was made into a State-Owned Enterprise in 1983. PINDAD was under management by PT. BPIS (Persero) from 1989 until 1998, when BPIS was disbanded. PT. BPIS was restructured as PT Bahana Pakarya Industri Strategis (Persero) in 1999, then was dissolved in 2002. From 2003 PT. PINDAD (Persero) came under the direct control of the Ministry of State-Owned Enterprises.

=== Malaysia (34) ===
- MAL Syarikat Malaysia Explosives Ltd. (1969–present) – Batu-Arang, Malaysia. Winchester and Radway Green sub-contractor for NATO ammunition (9mm Parabellum, 5.56mm NATO, 7.62mm NATO, and .50 Browning Machine-Gun) using British specifications. Headstamp has the contractor code (MAL) at 12 o'clock, the metric caliber (9, 5.56, 7.62, or 12.7) at 8 o'clock, and the date of manufacture (two-digit month and two-digit year separated by a hyphen) at 4 o'clock. It lacks the NATO standard stamp because it is not a Tier 3 NATO nation.

=== Philippines (46) ===
- RPA Republic of the Philippines Arsenal – Camp General Antonio Luna, Limay, Bataan, Republic of the Philippines.

== See also ==
- Headstamp
- National Codification Bureau
