= List of equipment of the National Guard of Russia =

The National Guard of Russia are equipped with weapons and military equipment of Soviet and Russian production.

== Uniforms and wear ==
Most members of Rosgvard wear ATACS variants by standard. During urban policing duties in cities within Russia, Rosgvard members wear either blue SURPAT or blue ATACS, both of which are printed on jackets or shirts.

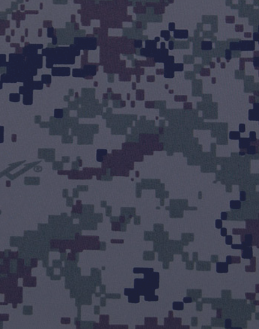
Blue SURPAT, in use by Rosgvard.

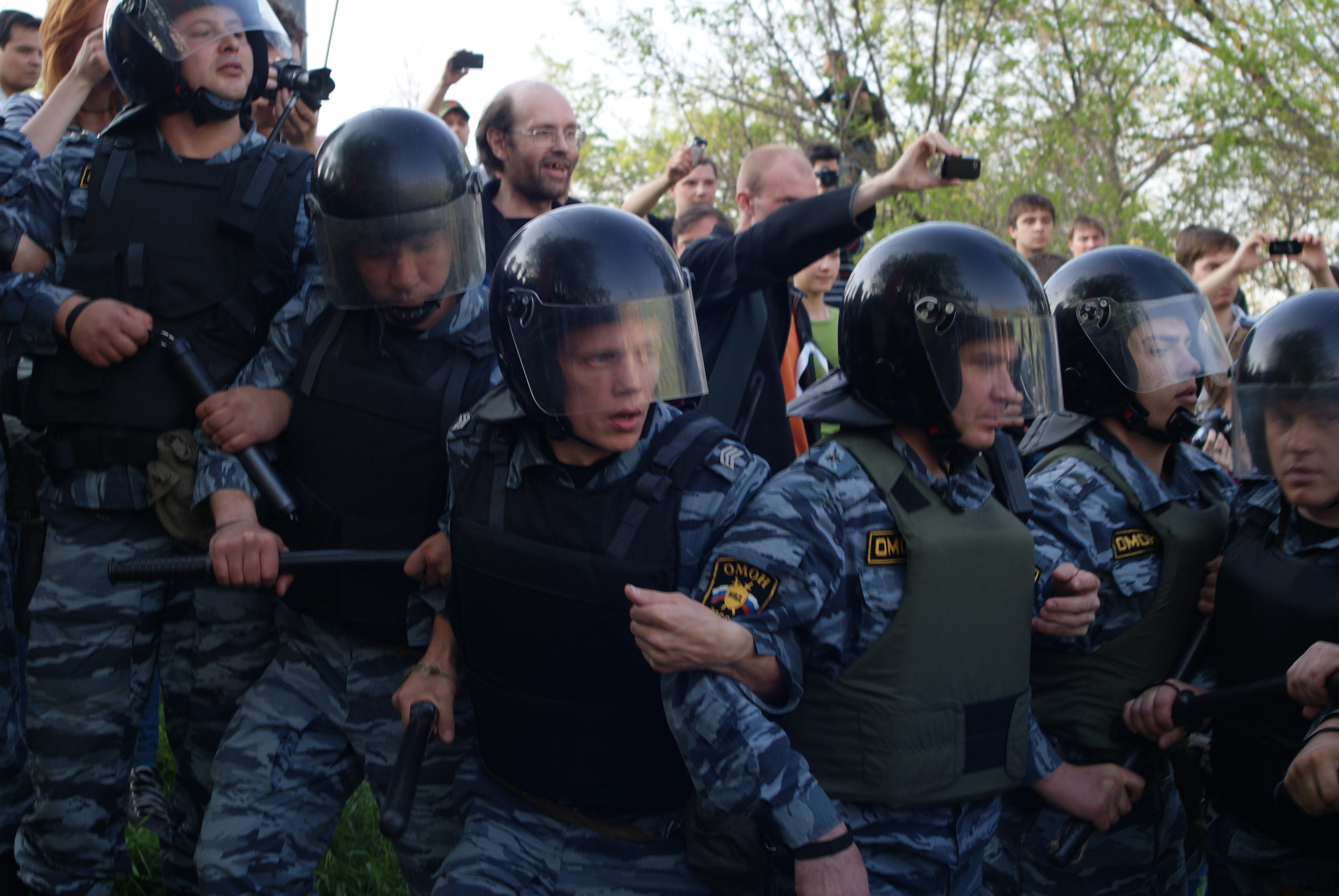
OMON, before the founding of Rosgvard, on crowd control duty. Dressed in blue Kamysh.

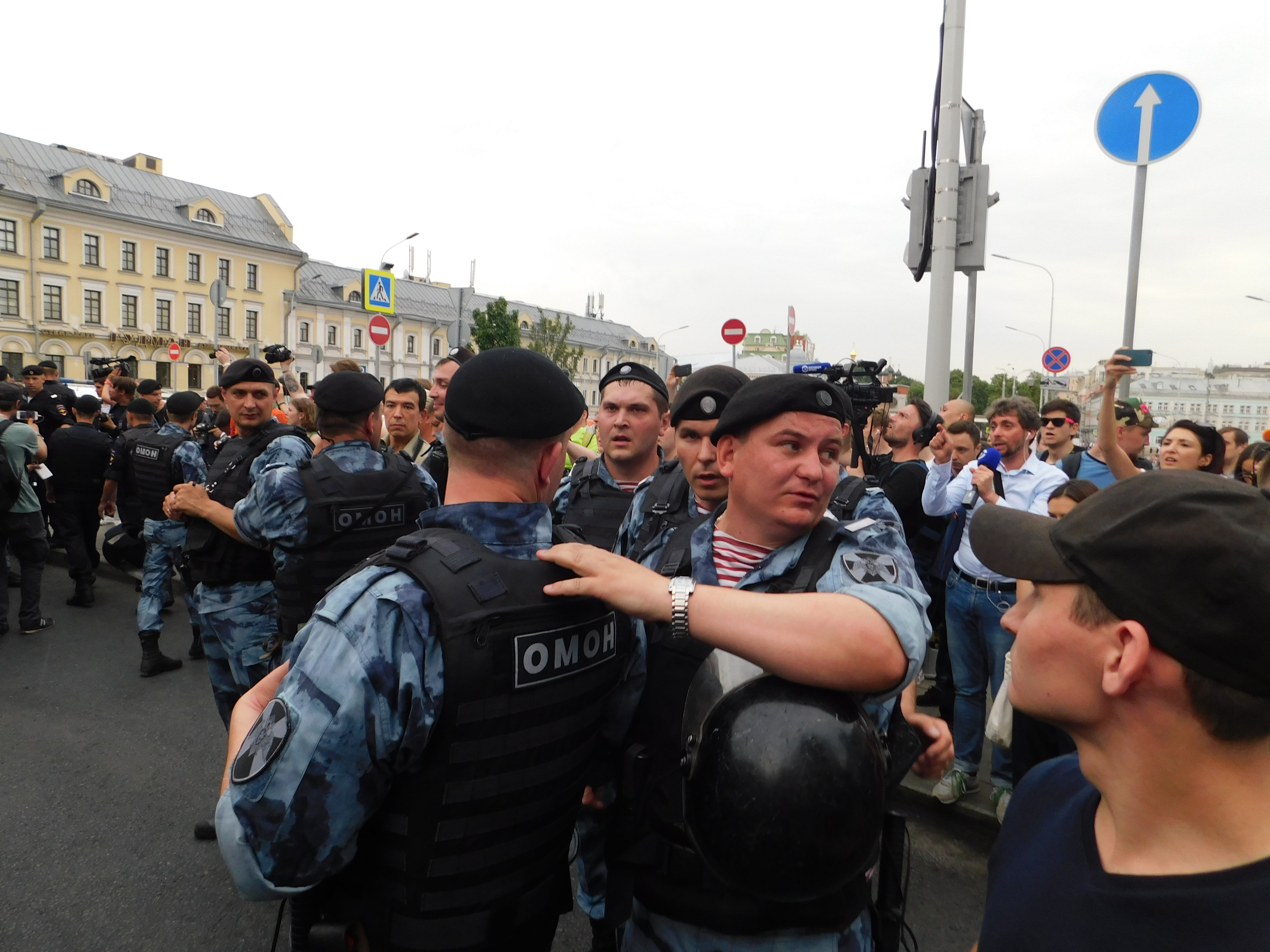
Rosgvard OMON, during crowd control duty, dressed in blue ATACS.

Before Rosgvard's uniform reformations, Rosgvard during urban policing used to wear blue variants of various Russian camouflages. Blue versions of Kukla (DPM) and Kamysh (Tigerstripe) were often optimized. During military exercises, parades, and combat deployments, Rosgvard uses more greener versions of the aforementioned camouflage patterns. The standard camouflages of Rosgvard are ATACS FG and ATAKA Moss (Russian domestic variant of ATACS). Certain Rosgvard units wears SURPAT on jackets occasionally. The Rosgvard uniform is either ATACS FG, ATACS Moss or SURPAT printed on a BDU shirt or jacket.

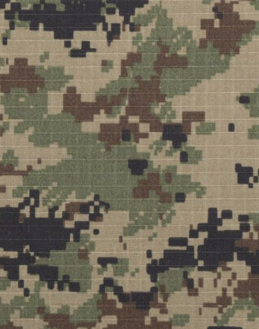
SURPAT in use by Rosgvard.

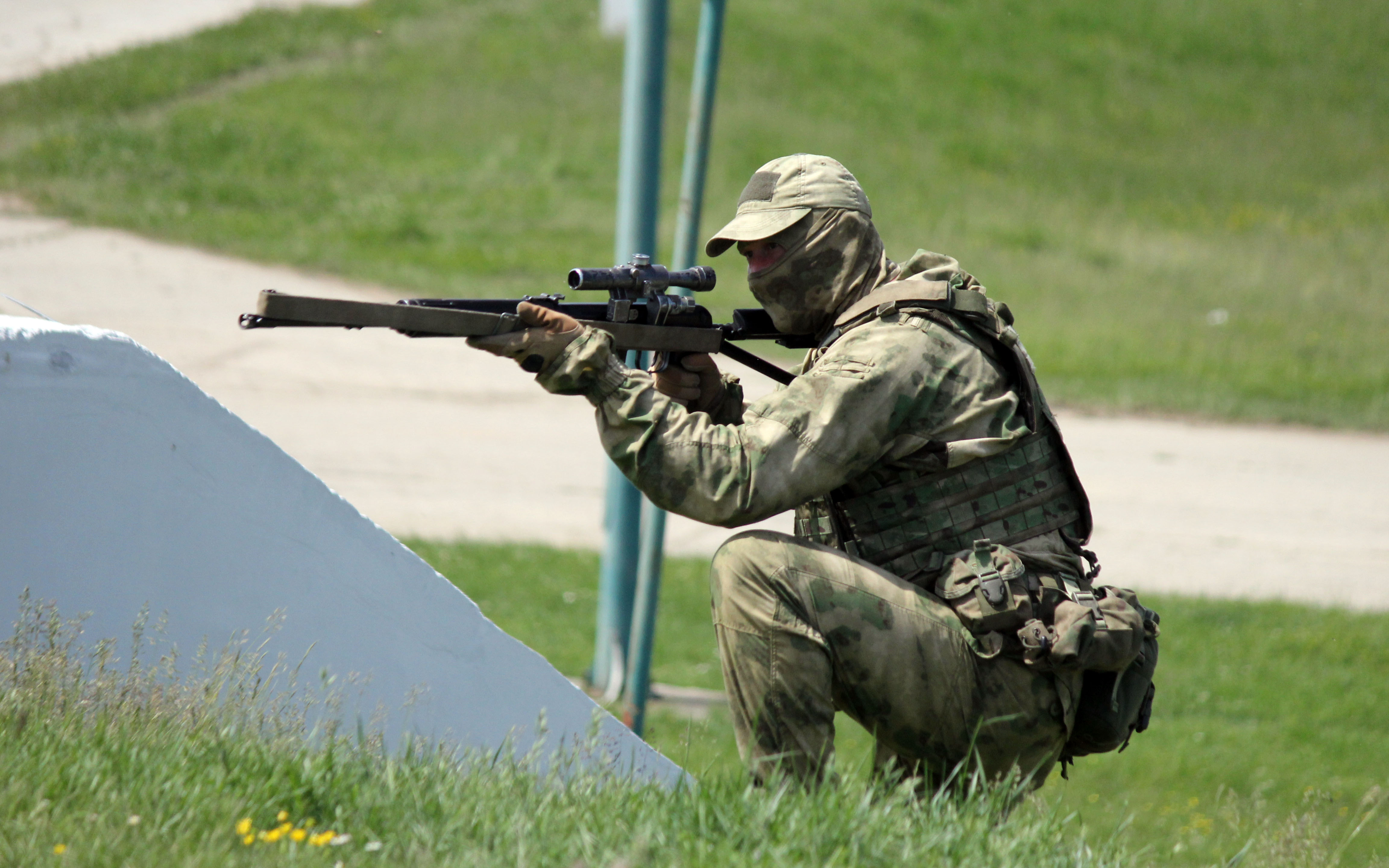
Spetsnaz sniper, during a joint exercise, dressed in ATACS FG.

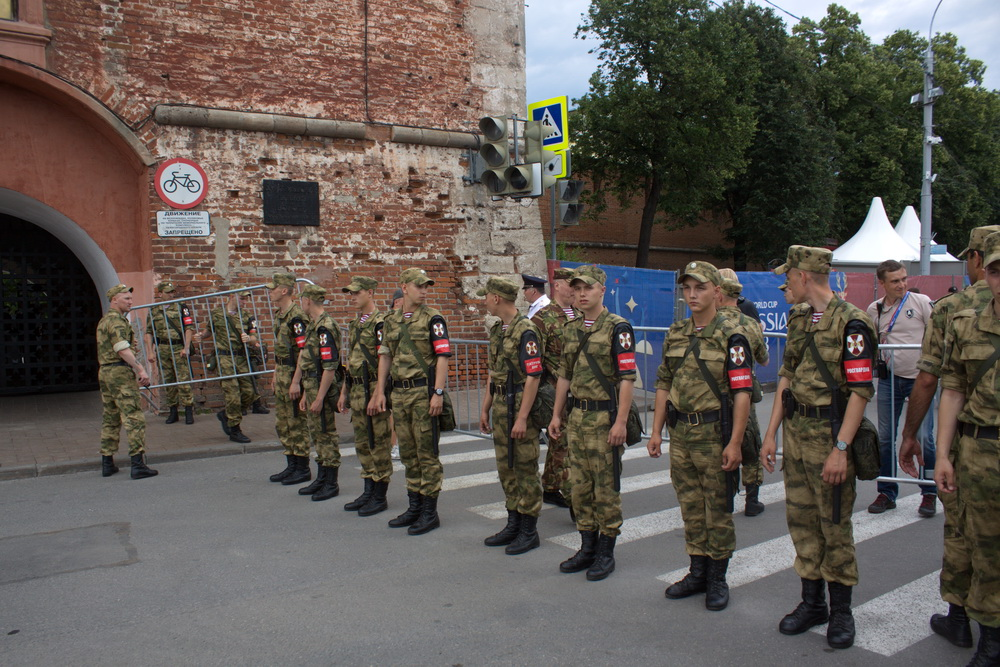
Rosgvard on duty at FIFA World Cup 2018, dressed in ATACS Moss.

The various units of the Rosgvard, before Rosgvard's uniform reformation, used various camouflage patterns such as Kukla (DPM), Amyoba (Amoeba), Berezka (KLMK), VSR, Flora, Kamysh, and so on.

== Body-mounted Gear ==
=== Helmets in use ===
Currently, the most commonly seen helmets within Rosgvard are the 6B7-1M and (visorless) ZSH. Alongside the aforementioned, Rosgvard also uses plenty of other helmets, such as 6B27, 6B28, and high-cut helmets.

=== Body armor in use ===
Obereg armor vest is being supplied since 2023.

== Small arms ==
=== Firearms ===
Model	Image	Cartridge	Type	Origin	Details
Handguns
PM		9×18mm Makarov	Semi-automatic pistol	Soviet Union	N/A
PMM		9×18mm Makarov	Semi-automatic pistol	Russia	N/A
MP-443 Grach		9×19mm Parabellum	Semi-automatic pistol	Russia	New standard issue for the National Guard. Supplied to the National Guard since 2018.
GSh-18		9×19mm Parabellum	Semi-automatic pistol	Russia	N/A
MPL Lebedev		9×19mm Parabellum	Semi-automatic pistol	Russia	
PB		9×18mm Makarov	Semi-automatic pistol	Soviet Union	Integrally suppressed version of the Makarov PM.
PSS		7.62×41mm SP-4	Silent action semi-automatic pistol	Soviet Union	N/A
Submachine guns
PP-2000		9×19mm Parabellum	Submachine gun	Russia	N/A
AEK-919K Kastan		9×18mm Makarov	Submachine gun	Russia	N/A
PP-19 Bizon		9×18mm Makarov	Submachine gun	Russia	N/A
PP-19 Vityaz		9×19mm Parabellum	Submachine gun	Russia	N/A
Assault rifles
AK-74		5.45×39mm	Assault rifle	Soviet Union	N/A
AKS-74U		5.45×39mm	Assault rifle	Soviet Union	
AK-74M		5.45×39mm	Assault rifle	Russia	Standard issue rifle for the National Guard.
AK-103		7.62×39mm	Assault rifle	Russia	
AK-105		5.45×39mm	Assault rifle	Russia	
AK-205		5.45×39mm	Assault rifle	Russia	
AK-12		5.45×39mm	Assault rifle	Russia	New standard-issue rifle for the National Guard. Introduced in 2017.
AS Val		9×39mm	Assault rifle	Russia	N/A
Sniper rifles
VSS		9×39mm	Designated marksman rifle	Soviet Union	N/A
VSK-94		9×39mm	Designated marksman rifle	Russia	
SVD		7.62×54mmR	Designated marksman rifle	Soviet Union	N/A
SVU		7.62×54mmR	Designated marksman rifle	Russia	N/A
MTs-116M		7.62×54mmR	Sniper rifle	Russia	
SV-98M		7.62×54mmR	Sniper rifle	Russia	N/A
Orsis T-5000 Tochnost		7.62×51mm NATO.338 Lapua Magnum.375 CheyTac	Sniper rifle	Russia	N/A
ASVK Kord		12.7×108mm	Anti-material rifle	Russia	N/A
OSV-96 Vzlomshchik		12.7×108mm	Anti-material rifle	Russia	N/A
Machine guns
RPK-74		5.45×39mm	Light machine gun	Soviet Union	N/A
RPK-16		5.45×39mm	Light machine gun	Russia	
PKM		7.62×54mmR	General-purpose machine gun	Soviet Union	N/A
PKP Pecheneg		7.62×54mmR	General-purpose machine gun	Russia	N/A
Special underwater weapons
SPP-1M		4.5×40mmR	Underwater pistol	Soviet Union	N/A
APS		5.66mm	Underwater assault rifle	Soviet Union	N/A
ADS		5.45×39mm 5.45×39mm PSP	Underwater assault rifle	Russia	N/A

=== Explosives ===
Model	Image	Cartridge	Type	Origin	Details
Grenade launchers
AGS-17 Plamya		30×29mm	Automatic grenade launcher	Soviet Union	N/A
GM-94		43×30mm	Grenade launcher	Russia	N/A
RG-6		40mm VOG-25	Grenade launcher	Russia	N/A
RGS-50M			Grenade launcher	Russia	

== Vehicles ==
Model	Image	Origin	Type	Number	Details
Armoured vehicles
BTR-70		Soviet Union	Armoured personnel carrier		N/A
BTR-80; BTR-82A		Soviet UnionRussia	Armoured personnel carrier	1,650	
BPM-97 Vystrel		Russia	Armoured personnel carrier		N/A
Z-STS Akhmat		Russia	Infantry mobility vehicle		Based on KamAZ-5350. It has the same protection as Typhoon and 6×6 wheel arrangement. The vehicle can be airlifted by Il-76, An-124 aircraft and transported by rail.
VPK-3924 Volk		Russia	Infantry mobility vehicle		N/A
Tigr		Russia	Infantry mobility vehicle		N/A
Ural-VV		Russia	Infantry mobility vehicle		N/A
SPM-3 Medved		Russia	Infantry mobility vehicle		
Patrul-A		Russia	Infantry mobility vehicle		
Logistics and utility vehicles
KamAZ-4350		Russia	Truck		Four-wheel drive truck vehicle. Produced since 2003, also in service in the Russian Armed Forces
Ural-4320		Soviet Union	Truck		N/A
UAZ-469		Soviet Union	Light utility vehicle		N/A
UAZ-31519		Soviet Union	Light utility vehicle		N/A

== Artillery ==
Name	Image	Origin	Type	Number	Details
2S43 Malva		Russia	Self-propelled artillery		Recently reported in service with Rosgvardiya units.

== Aircraft ==
List of active National Guard of Russia aircraft
Name	Image	Origin	Type	Variant	Active	Stored	Notes
Let L-410 Turbolet		Czechoslovakia	Military transport aircraft		1		
Antonov An-26		Soviet Union	Military transport aircraft		10	2	
Antonov An-12		Soviet Union	Military transport aircraft	An-12BK	2		
Yakovlev Yak-40		Soviet Union	VIP transport	Yak-40K	1		
Antonov An-72		Soviet Union	Military transport aircraft		5	1	
Sukhoi Superjet 100		Russia	Narrow-body jet airliner	Superjet 100-95B	1		
Tupolev Tu-134		Soviet Union	Narrow-body jet airliner	Tu-134AK / Tu-134UB-L	3	1	
Tupolev Tu-154		Soviet Union / Russia	Narrow-body jet airliner	Tu-154M / Tu-143B-2	2		
Ilyushin Il-76		Soviet Union	Military transport aircraft	Il-76MD	9	2	
Kamov Ka-226		Russia	Utility helicopter		9		
Eurocopter AS355N Écureuil 2		France	Utility helicopter		1		In service with the Alpha Group.
Kazan Ansat		Russia	Utility helicopter		1		
Mil Mi-8		Soviet Union	Transport helicopter	Mi-8PS / Mi-8T	26	3	
Mil Mi-8M		Soviet Union / Russia	Transport helicopter	Mi-8MT / Mi-8AMT / Mi-8AMTSh / Mi-8MTV-2 /	77	1	
Mil Mi-26		Soviet Union / Russia	Heavy lift transport helicopter	Mi-26T	4	2	
Mil Mi-24		Soviet Union	Helicopter gunship	Mi-24V / Mi-24P	8		
