= QBS-06 =

- Type: Underwater assault rifle
- Place of origin: China

Specifications
- Cartridge: 5.8×42 DBS-06
- Rate of fire: 600 rounds per minute
- Feed system: 25-round magazine

The QBS-06 underwater assault rifle (Chinese: QBS06式水下步枪; pinyin: QBS06 shì shuǐ xià bùqiāng) is a Chinese underwater assault rifle.

== History ==
In 2010, the QBS-06 was publicly shown to the public through news videos produced by CCTV. It was later seen during Chinese-Thai military exercises in the same year.

== Design ==
The QBS-06 is a gas-operated, rotary-bolt mechanism-based firearm modelled after the older Soviet APS rifle. While the QBS-06 looks similar to the APS, it is not an exact clone. The difference between the APS and the QBS-06 is through the flash suppressor, the magazine's flat bottom and the foregrip.

The QBS-06 is equipped with fixed iron sights and retractable shoulder stock, made of steel wire with the furniture made from plastic. It weighs around 3.15 kg and it has a cyclic rate of fire of 600 rounds per minute. It has a capacity of 25 rounds and is chambered in 5.8×42 DBS-06 caliber, a variant of 5.8×42mm.

The QBS-06 can be fitted with two types of bayonets, including the Type 95 (QNL-95) and the Type 06 (QNL-06), the latter being specifically designed for the QBS-06.

== Operators ==
- China: Jialong commando unit

== See also ==
- Heckler & Koch P11
- APS underwater rifle
- ADS amphibious rifle
- SPP-1 underwater pistol
