= Mk 1 Underwater Defense Gun =

Underwater firearm developed by the United States during the Cold War

M1 Underwater Defense Gun
- Type: Underwater pistol
- Place of origin: United States

Service history
- In service: 1970–1976
- Wars: Falklands War

Production history
- Designed: 1967

Specifications
- Mass: Empty: 2.26 lb (1.03 kg) Loaded: 4.17 lb (1.89 kg)
- Length: 9.75 in (248 mm)
- Barrel length: 4.25 in (108 mm)
- Cartridge: Mark 59 Mod 0 Projectile
- Barrels: 6
- Action: Double action only Pepper-box
- Rate of fire: 12 rpm
- Muzzle velocity: 740 ft/s (230 m/s)
- Effective firing range: 30 ft (9.1 m)
- Feed system: 6-round removable cylinder

The M1 Underwater Defense Gun, also called the Underwater Defense Gun Mark 1 Mod 0, is an underwater firearm developed by the United States during the Cold War. Similar to other underwater firearms, it fires a special 4.25-inch (108 mm) metal dart as its projectile.

== History ==
The gun was developed as part of a project called TDP 3801 during the 1960s, and much of the work on it occurred at the Naval Surface Warfare Center White Oak Laboratory in Silver Spring, Maryland, US. Originally, the idea was for the LanceJet, a rocket-based weapon similar to the Gyrojet family of firearms. Still, rocket-powered weapons proved to be expensive and inaccurate, so alternatives were researched. The result was the Mk 1 Underwater Defense Gun, introduced in the early 1970s. It proved effective but, says Tom Hawkins of the nonprofit Naval Special Warfare Foundation, "It was bulky and heavy and the men never warmed up to it. It was also a signature controlled item – as in signing your name to check it out – and administratively a burden to the operational units." In 1976, the Heckler & Koch P11 was introduced, and it soon replaced the Mk 1.

== Design ==
The Mk 1 is a double action only pepper-box weapon, and its removable cylinder magazine fits into the side of a gun, being inserted and removed through a door on the left side of the gun. The frame, cylinder, door assembly, and action are made of aluminum, the trigger is made of self-lubricating nylon, and all other parts are made of stainless steel. The magazine holds six rounds.

== Mark 59 Mod 0 Projectile ==
The distinctive cartridge fired by the M1 is the Mark 59, a stainless steel cylinder containing a single 4.25-inch (108 mm) long heavy tungsten dart. Near the base of the cylinder is the firing assembly, and when the firing pin strikes the primer, the propellant, contained in a chamber below the firing assembly, ignites and propels the dart out of the cylinder.

The dart itself is long and thin, and it has four fins machined into its rear section, with each fin having a small angle cut into it that causes water to flow over it and give the projectile a stabilizing spin. The shape of the dart helps it to penetrate the water while retaining a high velocity.

The self-contained design of the Mark 59 contributes to the propellant gases being kept in the cartridge, which eliminates muzzle blast that could produce a dangerous shock wave. It also has the side effect of eliminating muzzle flash and reducing sound, so that the weapon can function as an emergency covert weapon if necessary, although this was rare because of the high cost of the ammunition.

== See also ==
- AAI underwater revolver – Six-round amphibious revolver for naval use
