= ASM-DT amphibious rifle =

Russian folding stock underwater firearm

ASM-DT Underwater Assault Rifle
- The ASM-DT Underwater Assault Rifle
- Type: Underwater assault rifle
- Place of origin: Soviet Union / Russia

Service history
- In service: 2000s (test only)
- Used by: Russia
- Wars: Unclear due to secrecy

Production history
- Designer: Prof. Yuri Danilov
- Designed: 1969
- Manufacturer: Tula Arms Plant
- Produced: End of 1990s

Specifications
- Length: 620 mm with stock folded
- Barrel length: 430 mm
- Cartridge: 5.45×39mm (cartridges for the above-water shooting); 5.45×39mm MGTS (for underwater shooting)
- Caliber: 5.45mm
- Action: Gas operated, rotating bolt
- Rate of fire: Above water: 600 rpm, below water: 500 rpm
- Feed system: 30-round detachable box magazine (Above water); 26-rounds detachable magazine (Underwater)
- Sights: Open

The ASM-DT is a Russian prototype folding-stock underwater firearm. It emerged in the 1990s.

== History and design ==
The introduction of the APS Underwater Assault Rifle solved the problem of how frogmen guarding a naval base could be armed, but there remained the problem of how to arm naval Spetsnaz combat frogmen when they were deployed on assault missions. These forces required a weapon able to provide them with a level of firepower that would be the same whether they were on the surface or underwater. The APS was of little use out of water, because under those conditions it was inaccurate, with an effective range of only 50 meters. In addition, when it was used out of the water, it wore out quickly, with a barrel life dropping from approximately 2000 rounds to only 180 to 200 rounds.

For this reason, the naval Spetsnaz forces often used the SPP-1 pistol for underwater fighting, and the AK-74 rifle out of water. The commandos thought that this arrangement was unsatisfactory, and there continued to be demand for an underwater automatic rifle that would be as effective underwater and as an AK-74 out of water. As a result, in 1991, at the Artillery Engineering Institute in Tula, Russia, the ASM-DT project was created, with Yuriy Danilov as project engineer.

To meet the requirements, a long smoothbore barrel was necessary for the new rifle to fire underwater, but a rifled barrel was necessary to achieve any significant range while above water. To solve this problem and get a true 'hybrid' design, the rifle would have to fire two types of projectile: one underwater and another above water. The rifle was designed with two feed slots, able to accept two magazines at the same time, to make the transition seamless. Danilov designed the ASM-DT to fire both 5.45 x 39 mm 7N6 (a version of the standard Soviet ammunition), adapted to the caliber of the ASM-DT, and also 5.45 x 39 mm MGTS (a.k.a. 5.66×39/120 mm MPS), underwater ammunition like that of the existing APS. The ASM-DT uses the same magazines as the APS while under water, and AK-74 magazines above water. The magazine release shifts forward when using AK-74 magazines, and the gas system automatically adjusts for firing out of water. To enable accurate shooting when outside of water, the barrel is rifled, however it has shallow grooves along its length, which expel some gases ahead of the bullet and blow any water out of the barrel. This prevents the barrel from bursting if the rifle is taken to the surface quickly, and fired outside of water without being drained first. In addition, the rifle can be equipped with a GP-25 grenade launcher, a bayonet, or a PBS sound and flash suppressor.

Additional accessories include: flame arrestor, a blank firing device for low-noise shooting (UPMS), various types of optical and night sights, and tactical lights. The rifle has a folding stock, which, along with the pistol grip and handguard, are made of impact resistant plastic.

The combat effectiveness of ASM-DT is comparable with the AK-74 and APS when fired in air and water environments, respectively.

See APS amphibious rifle for considerations involving shooting power underwater.

== See also ==
- Underwater firearm – Firearms that can be effectively fired underwater
- APS underwater rifle – Soviet underwater assault firearm firing unrifled steel flechettes
- ADS amphibious rifle – Russian bullpup assault rifle for combat divers
- List of modern Russian small arms and light weapons
- List of assault rifles

== Bibliography ==
- Leszek Erenfeicht, Rosyjska broń strzelecka dla płetwonurków, Strzał 5/2003. ISSN 1644-4906
- Modern Firearms - ASM-DT Morskoj Lev (Sea Lion) dual medium (underwater and above water) assault rifle
