= Lancejet =

Lancejet may refer to:

- A planned underwater variation of the Gyrojet (a hand-held rocket-firing firearm)
- A brand of pressure washer nozzle
