= 7th Marine Brigade (PLA Navy Marine Corps) =

Chinese military unit

- 海军陆战队第七旅 (Chinese)
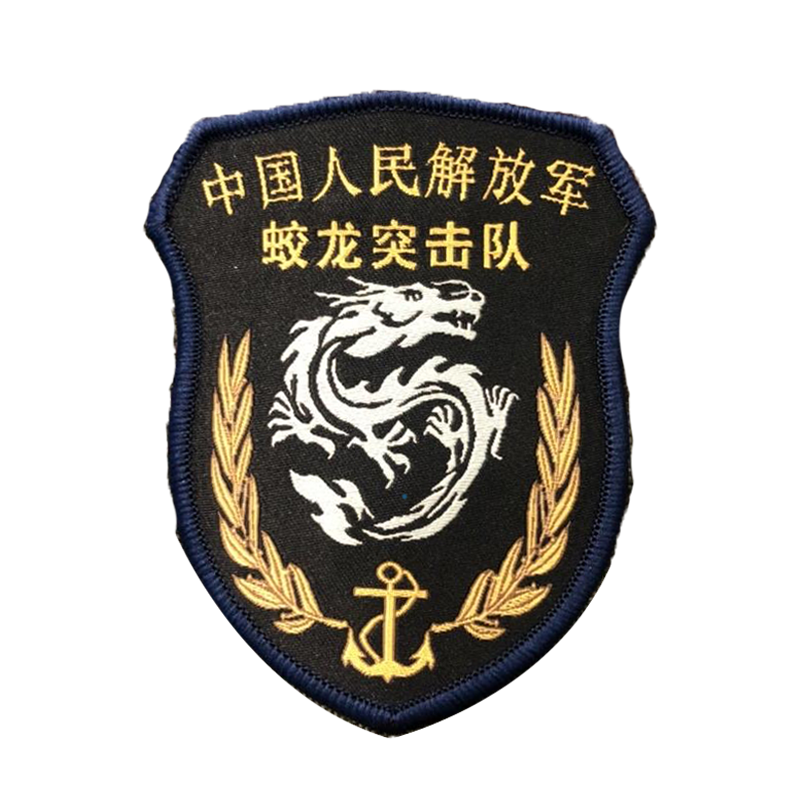
- Insignia of the 7th Marine Brigade
- Active: 2002–present
- Country: People's Republic of China
- Branch: People's Liberation Army Navy Marine Corps
- Type: Special Operations Forces; Marines
- Role: Special Operations; Amphibious reconnaissance Sabotage; Combat diving Anti-Piracy; Hostage Rescue
- Size: 3000
- Garrison/HQ: Yulin Naval Base, Sanya
- Nickname: "Jiaolong Commandos" or "Sea Dragons"
- March: "March of the Jiaolong Commandos" (蛟龙突击队之歌)
- Mascot: Jiaolong
- Engagements: Anti-Piracy Operations in the Gulf of Aden; Evacuation of Chinese nationals from Yemen

The 7th Marine Brigade (Chinese: 海军陆战队第七旅), commonly known as the "Jiaolong Commandos" (Chinese: 蛟龙突击队), is a special operations unit of the People's Liberation Army Navy Marine Corps. The brigade is based in Sanya, Hainan. The brigade is also sometimes known as the named the Special Operations Brigade (Chinese: 特種作戰旅). The brigade has at least three special operations battalions and one reconnaissance battalion.

== History ==
The unit was founded in 2002 as the PLAN Special Operations Battalion.

On December 26, 2008, 70 members of the brigade deployed to the Gulf of Aden where they carried out operations with the PLAN's first antipiracy task force. In 2015, Jiaolong commandos participated in the evacuation of 571 Chinese citizens and over 200 other foreign nationals from Yemen after a Saudi-led coalition began airstrikes against the Houthi rebel group (Yemen Civil War).

In April 2017 10 members of the brigade, in coordination with the Indian navy, helped rescue 19 Syrian crewmembers from a hijacked Tuvalu cargo ship in the Indian Ocean.

On 5 May 2017, 3 pirates were captured by the unit and handed over to the Somali Police Force.

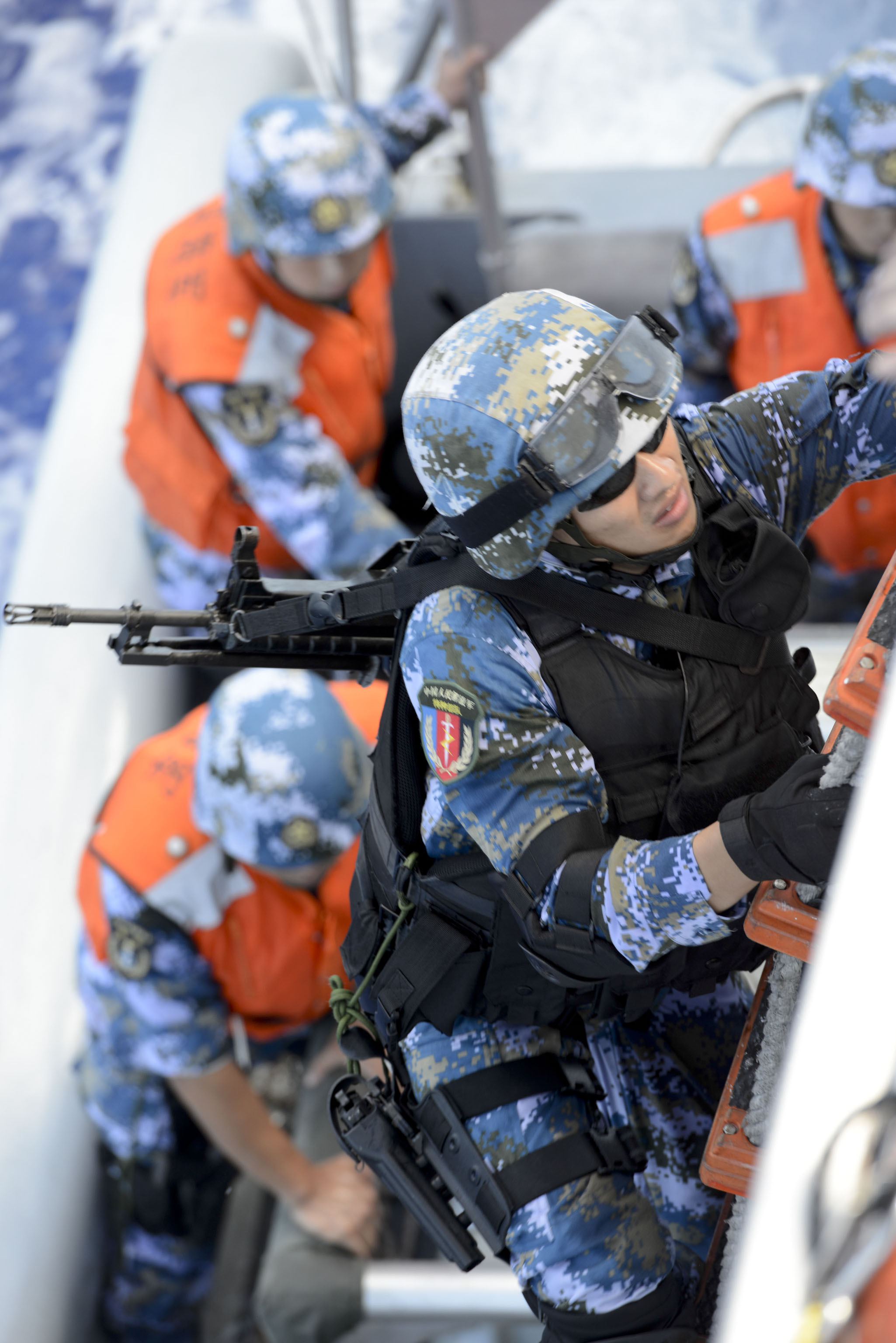
Personnel of the 7th Marine Brigade boarding a ship during the United States Pacific Fleet Exercise RIMPAC

== Missions ==
The brigade is used for Visit, board, search, and seizure (VBSS), anti-piracy, air assault, direct action, combat diving, sabotage and amphibious reconnaissance.

The brigade has carried out joint exercises with People's Armed Police special operations units.

== In popular culture ==
The 2018 film Operation Red Sea is loosely based on the unit's involvement in the evacuation of Chinese and foreign nationals in the Yemeni Civil War and also depicts the unit.

== Equipment ==
- Night-vision devices
- QBS-06
- QBU-10
- QBZ-95
- QBZ-191
- QSS-05 underwater rifle
- Unmanned aerial vehicles

== See also ==
- MARCOS
- Marine Raiders
- Navy SEALS
- Russian Naval Spetsnaz
- Special Boat Service

== Bibliography ==
- Erickson, Andrew S; Kennedy, Conor M; Martinson, Ryan D (2024). "Study No. 8, Chinese Amphibious Warfare: Prospects for a Cross-Strait Invasion". CMSI Studies in China Maritime Development.
- Kennedy, Conor (October 2021). "China Maritime Report No. 15: The New Chinese Marine Corps: A "Strategic Dagger" in a Cross-Strait Invasion". CMSI China Maritime Reports (10–2021).
- Masafumi, IIDA (27 September 2022). "The Current Status and Prospects of China's Growing Marine Corps" (PDF). NIDS Commentary (238). National Institute for Defense Studies.
