= Underwater firearm =

Firearms that can be effectively fired underwater

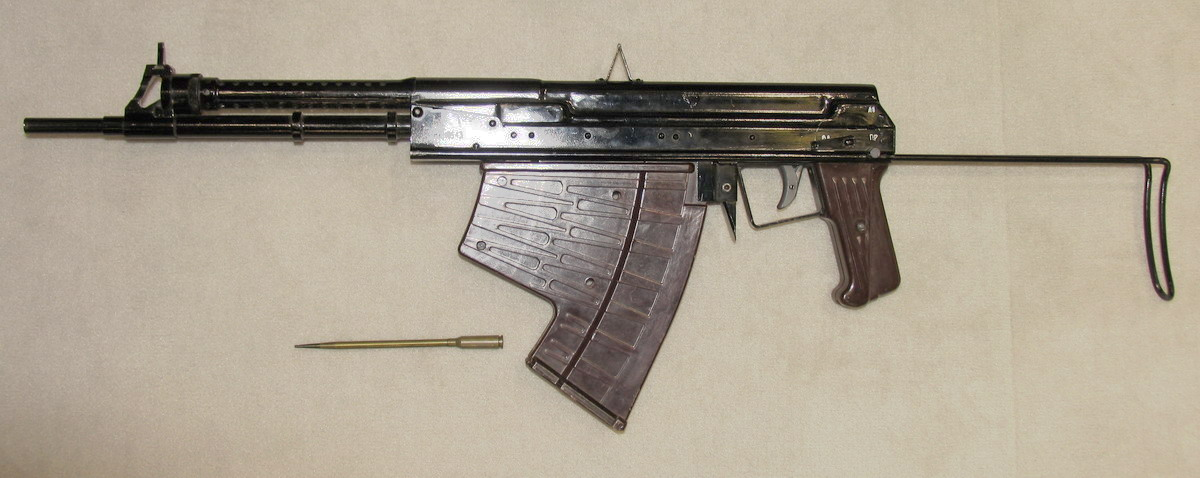
The APS amphibious rifle, an underwater assault rifle

An underwater firearm is a firearm designed for use underwater. Underwater firearms or needleguns usually fire flechettes or spear-like bolts instead of standard bullets. These may be fired by pressurised gas.

== History ==
Underwater firearms were first developed in the 1960s during the Cold War as a way to arm combat divers.

== Design ==
Because standard bullet ammunition does not work well underwater, underwater firearms commonly fire flechettes instead of standard bullets.

The barrels of underwater pistols are typically not rifled. Rather, the fired projectile maintains its ballistic trajectory underwater by hydrodynamic effects. The lack of rifling renders these weapons relatively inaccurate when fired out of water. Underwater rifles are more powerful than underwater pistols and more accurate out of water, but underwater pistols can be manipulated more easily underwater.

Among the many engineering challenges in designing underwater firearms is that of developing a weapon which can be effective both underwater and out of water. The ASM-DT amphibious rifle is an early example of such a weapon. First fielded by the Russian special forces in 2000, the folding-stock ASM-DT amphibious rifle is capable of firing two kinds of ammunition, both of 5.45 mm caliber:

1. 5.45×39mm rifle cartridge (7N6 enhanced penetration variant) for above water use
2. 5.45×39mm MGTS variant for underwater use. The projectile in this case is a steel dart, 120 mm (4.7 in) in length.

When used against underwater targets, an underwater firearm may have a longer range and more penetrating power than spearguns. This is useful in such situations as shooting an underwater intruder where the projectile may have to first penetrate a reinforced dry suit, or a protective helmet (whether air-holding or not), or a thick tough part of their breathing set and its harness, or the plastic casing or transparent cover of a small underwater vehicle.

== Supercavitating ammunition ==
Supercavitating ammunition that functions better underwater has been developed by Defence & Security Group (DSG), a Norwegian company. The Multi-Environment Ammunition (MEA) series supercavitating rifle ammunition, developed and marketed by DSG, is anticipated to be useful for certain special operations, including underwater warfare. These include defensive applications such as diver protection, and offensive applications such as neutralizing enemy divers, VBSS (visit, board, search, and seizure) operations, MIO (maritime interception operations), GOPLATS (Gas and oil platform) boarding operations, speedboat interdiction and neutralization, anti-submarine warfare, anti-torpedo operations, and certain counter-piracy operations.

The ballistic characteristics of MEA series ammunition allows the user to fire at an underwater target from above the water, an above-the-water target from underwater, or an underwater target from underwater. This ammunition allows the user to fire from above the surface into the water at a very low angle of incidence—in some cases as low as two degrees—without ricochet. After entering the water, the bullet will continue its original trajectory. The user, when aiming the gun, needs to compensate for the refractive index of the water (roughly 1.333 for fresh water at 20 °C (68 °F)).

MEA series supercavitating ammunition is currently available in the following calibers:

- 5.56×45mm NATO (accurate range of 15 m (49 ft) underwater)
- 7.62×51mm NATO (accurate range of 25 m (82 ft) underwater)
  - General Purpose
  - Dual Core
  - Armor Piercing
- 12.7×99mm NATO (.50 BMG, accurate range of 60 m (200 ft) underwater)
  - Super Sniper Tactical
  - Dual Core

The underwater capabilities of MEA series supercavitating ammunition allow it to be used for unmanned underwater vehicle (UUV) applications. The armed UUVs can be used in both offensive and defensive underwater warfare operations. Using the .50 BMG supercavitating cartridge, an armed UUV can potentially destroy steel-hulled underwater objects from a distance of 60 m (200 ft), or could potentially hit a target 1,000 m (3,300 ft) in the air from a location 5 m (16 ft) below the surface.

== Examples ==
Germany

- Heckler & Koch P11

Soviet Union / Russia

- ADS amphibious rifle
- APS underwater rifle
- ASM-DT amphibious rifle
- SPP-1 underwater pistol

United States

- AAI underwater revolver
- Mk 1 Underwater Defense Gun
- The Lancejet (an underwater variant of the Gyrojet manufactured by MB Associates) was once considered for use by the United States military, but it was removed from consideration due to its inaccuracy under field testing conditions. (For other meanings see Lancejet.)

China

- QBS-06

Vietnam

- SHMT-M1

== See also ==
- Powerhead – Specialized firearm used underwater
- Speargun – Underwater fishing implement
