= Vladimir Simonov =

Vladimir Simonov may refer to:

- Vladimir Simonov (actor) (1957–2025), Soviet and Russian actor
- Vladimir Simonov (engineer) (1935–2020), Russian engineer
