= Powerhead (firearm) =

Specialized firearm used underwater

- Type: Underwater firearm

Specifications
- Cartridge: .22 WMR; 12 gauge and larger; .357 Magnum; .44 Magnum; Others

A powerhead is a specialized firearm used underwater that is fired when in direct contact with the target. Powerheads are often used for spear fishing and against sharks or alligators for sport, defense, or to kill nuisance animals. The term powerhead refers to the firearm-like part of the device; when attached to a shaft to form a spear, it may be referred to as a bang stick or shark stick. The spear in question may be handheld or launchable from a speargun.

== Design ==
A powerhead consists of a length of tubing which is the chamber for the cartridge, a firing pin to fire the cartridge, and usually some form of safety pin or latch that prevents firing when it is engaged. The rear of the power head is fitted with some provision for attaching to a spear.

Powerheads are available that chamber a variety of handgun, rifle, and shotgun cartridges, from .22 WMR to 12 gauge and larger. .357 Magnum is probably the most common, as it is fairly powerful yet still compact enough to be used in a spear gun. Large cartridges such as the 12 gauge are generally only used on a handheld spear.

Some powerheads use the cartridge to propel a barbed spear point into the target. These are generally used on a bangstick for alligator hunting, to secure a line to the alligator to prevent escape.

=== Purpose of contact-shooting ===
Bullets are generally designed to work in air, which has a very low density. The density of water is roughly 800 times higher than that of air at sea level, and that reduces the penetration of a bullet proportionally. A bullet might travel a mile (1.6 km) in air, but travel no more than a few feet (about a meter) in water. Expanding hunting or defensive ammunition, such as that using hollow point bullets, will penetrate even less, as the water is dense enough to cause the bullet to expand. By firing while in contact with the target, a powerhead does not waste energy on traveling through the water, but rather expends all its energy directly on the target.

=== How they work ===
Although most commercial powerheads use standard handgun ammunition, such as .357 Magnum or .44 Magnum, many users choose to use larger caliber ammunition to do maximum damage to the intended target. A common misconception of how powerheads function is that the muzzle blast does the damage, as much high-pressure gas is forced into the flesh of the target. While the gas does do some minimal damage, it is ultimately the penetration of the slug that causes the damage to the target. Most powerheads function just as traditional firearms do, except that it is the spear which acts as the firing hammer. One commercially produced version used a modified .30-30 Winchester cartridge case, loaded backwards, with a primed .38 Special case loaded in its mouth holding the primer. The cartridge was loaded with the .30-30 case facing outwards, so that the .30-30 case full of burning powder was propelled into the target upon firing. This system is fast to reload and one of the most effective despite the fact that it does not use a bullet.

=== Ammunition issues ===
Since most powerheads are designed to use commercial ammunition, which is not designed to be used underwater, the ammunition used must be waterproofed. A coating of nail polish or varnish is commonly used around the primer and case mouth. For shotshells, a layer of rubber, such as a balloon, can be used to seal the crimped front of the shell.

== Legal issues ==
=== Australia ===
In Australia they are classed as category A firearms requiring a legitimate reason for issuance of a permit to acquire to a weapons licence holder. When not in use, they must be safely stored in a locked container with ammunition stored separately. Regulations vary between states, with some states permitting their use for defense against sharks only, and not for spearfishing.

=== United States ===
A powerhead may be considered a firearm under some circumstances. In the US, the ATF considers a powerhead a firearm if it is not permanently affixed to a shaft; generally powerheads are sold spot welded to a temporary steel shaft giving an overall length of greater than 18 inches (45 cm). After installing permanently on a spear shaft, the spot weld is cut, and the temporary shaft discarded. Revenue Ruling 55-569, C.B. 1955–2, 483 says:

A device ostensibly designed for submarine spear fishing, but capable of chambering and firing .22 caliber rimfire ammunition, is a firearm within the purview of the National Firearms Act. However, such device, if permanently attached to the speargun shaft by the manufacturer, would not be a firearm.

— Revenue Ruling 55-569, C.B. 1955-2, 483

This ruling is with regard to the National Firearms Act, and not to the 1968 Gun Control Act. (The National Firearms Act defines "firearm" as machine guns, short-barreled rifles, short-barreled shotguns, and concealable firearms that are neither pistols nor revolvers.) This means that powerheads may still be under the authority of the 1968 Gun Control Act with regard to shipping them and purchase of them from licensed dealers.

Laws may also prohibit the use of powerheads in sport fishing. They are allowed in US federally controlled waters, but many states prohibit their use in state controlled waters. One can be easily in violation of state law despite being compliant with federal regulations.
