= Russian commando frogmen =

Tactical scuba diving unit

Naval Spetsnaz
- Морской спецназ Morskoy spetsnaz
- Russian Marine Commandos logo patch
- Active: 1941–present
- Country: Russia
- Branch: Russian Naval Infantry
- Type: Spetsnaz
- Size: 480–800 OMRP; 650–780 PDSS
- Part of: GRU (1941–1992); Russian Naval Intelligence (1941–present); GRU (G.U.) (1992–present)
- Nickname: Frogmen
- Equipment: IDA Rebreathers; "Piranha" midget submarine; 2-man torpedo; "Triton-1" midget submarine; "Triton-2" midget submarine; APS Underwater Assault Rifle; SPP-1 Underwater Pistol; Protei-5; "PPV" underwater tablet
- Engagements: World War II; Cold War; First Chechen War; Second Chechen War; Russo-Georgian War; Annexation of Crimea by the Russian Federation; Syrian Civil War; Russo-Ukrainian War

Commanders
- Notable commanders: Viktor Leonov

The Russian commando frogmen (Russian: Морской спецназ, romanized: Morskoy spetsnaz), also known as Russian Naval Spetsnaz, is a special operations unit subordinated to the GRU. It is the special forces unit of the Russian Naval Infantry. It falls under the Coastal Troops of the Russian Navy service arm.

It specializes in amphibious reconnaissance to prepare for amphibious warfare, clandestine operation, defense against swimmer incursions, direct action against important strategic or tactical goals, irregular warfare, ISTAR, maritime counterterrorism and hostage rescue, and naval special warfare. Russian FSB special forces Alpha Group and Vympel also have frogman units in their respective naval components.

== History ==
=== Pre war and WWII ===
On 22 October 1938, during wargaming between units of the Russian Pacific Fleet in Vladivostok, a group of Soviet military divers exited a Shchuka-class submarine (hull number 112) through a torpedo tube. They succeeded in infiltrating the naval base, where they completed certain acts of sabotage. These combat divers were equipped with oxygen rebreathers, dry suits, handguns and grenades. This did not lead to a permanent combat diver unit being set up, but it was the beginning of the history of Soviet combat divers.

The Soviet Union started frogman operations during World War II. The first unit of combat divers (or RON team), was formed in Leningrad in 1941. The most prominent of the new recruits was Viktor Leonov, who joined the Soviet Navy in 1937. He was assigned to a submarine training detachment and then transferred to a repair station in the Northern Fleet at Polyarnyy. Leonov had trained in tactical scuba diving, after which he joined 4th Special Volunteer Detachment, where he proved his daring and leadership skills conducting numerous clandestine operations and twice being awarded the title of Hero of the Soviet Union. Soviet combat divers were quite successful during World War Two. They performed a variety of missions numbering well over 200 operations. These operations consisted of more than just combat operations and demolitions. There were many rescue missions which also included female divers recovering weapons and other military equipment from sunken cargo ships. Other operations also included making minor repairs of ships that were afloat and clearing approaches to wharf facilities at the sites of fords across the Volga river. There were also operations which involved recovering the dead that were present on sunken ships or in the Volga river.

In 1953, according to directives of the Main Headquarters of the Naval Forces of the USSR, they started to establish completely secret Detached Naval Reconnaissance Points (OMRPs). In the beginning they were named Naval Reconnaissance Divisions of the Special Intelligence, purposed for high risk special operations.

The mission of the Naval Spetsnaz was to conduct what the Soviets call Special Reconnaissance (Spetsialnaya Razvedka). During the Cold War, each Soviet fleet would have a brigade of "naval assault pioneers" with a wartime strength of up to 1,300 men and capable of deploying about 100 teams. Naval special forces were organized into spetsnaz brigades consisting of five spetsnaz detachments (battalions), a signal company, support units, and a headquarters company containing highly skilled professional soldiers and frogmen responsible for carrying out amphibious reconnaissance, assassinations high-value targets, commando style raids, combat search and rescue, contact with agents behind enemy lines, kidnappings targets useful to military intelligence, long-range penetration, maritime sabotage, special reconnaissance, and underwater demolition. The organization of a naval special purpose brigade reflects its emphasis on sea infiltration, with up to three frogman battalions, one parachute battalion, and a minisubmarine battalion, as well as the signal company, headquarters company, and support elements.

In 1967, the Anti-diversionary forces and means, or 'PDSS', began development in the Soviet Black Sea Fleet. PDSS is a complex of special measures developed by the Soviet Navy to counter possible attacks by frogmen. PDSS includes specially trained units (teams) of the Soviet Navy, frogman and anti-frogman training and special weapons and tactics. According to some historians, Soviet Naval Commanders decided to form PDSS after the Lionel Crabb incident.

=== Post breakup of the USSR ===
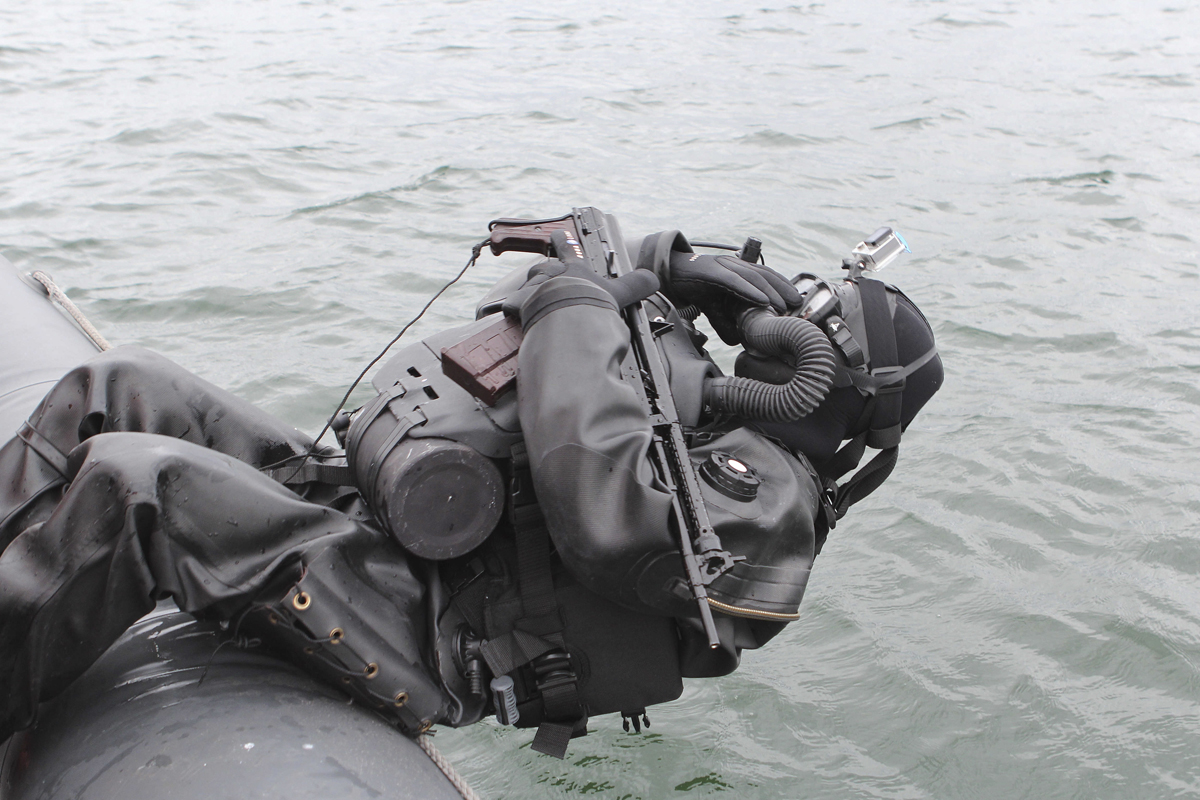
Naval spetsnaz frogman

Most Soviet Naval spetsnaz units were transferred to the newly formed Russian Navy and subsequently downsized. At least one unit, the 17th Naval Special Purpose Brigade, was transferred to the Ukrainian Navy and was reorganized as the 1464th Marine Reconnaissance point. Shortly after, the 1464th MRP was again reorganized as the 7th Special Purpose Brigade of the Ukrainian Navy, after about two-thirds of the unit's personnel swore an oath to Ukraine. In 2003, the unit became the 73rd Naval Special Operations Center.

Russian naval spetsnaz, have been less visible in the wake of the USSR's dissolution. By the end of the 1990s there was only one full-strength naval spetsnaz brigade, at Ocharkov on the Black Sea. However, in 1998 the Russian Navy's commander in chief, Admiral Vladimir Kuroyedov, reaffirmed that naval special-operations units remain assigned to the Russian Baltic, Northern, Pacific, and Black Sea fleets. Although the admiral provided few specifics on the size and capabilities of the units, he did indicate that they were elite, that they were equipped with special weapons (including small submarines), and that they were comparable to U.S. Navy SEALS or the Israeli Navy's Shayetet 13 counterparts, stating that these units have no special name beyond their "combat swimmer" or "naval spetsnaz" designations.

== Units and structure ==
=== Naval Special Reconnaissance (OMRP) ===
The first Naval Special Reconnaissance unit, the 42nd OMRP is composed of reconnaissance divers that fall under operational subordination to the Main Intelligence Directorate (GRU). There are currently four OMRPs in Russia, one for each fleet: Northern Fleet, Baltic Fleet, Black Sea Fleet and Pacific Fleet with each consisting of approximately 120–200 personnel.

- Naval Special Reconnaissance (OMRP)
  - 42nd Naval Reconnaissance Station (Pacific Fleet)
  - 388th Naval Reconnaissance Station (Black Sea Fleet) - reorganized from the former 431st MRP
  - 420th Naval Reconnaissance Station (Northern Fleet)
  - 561st Naval Reconnaissance Station (Baltic Fleet)

=== Combat against Underwater Incursion Forces and Devices (PDSS) ===
PDSS are special purpose (spetsnaz) unit of the Russian Naval Infantry, trained to conduct land and sea operations behind enemy lines, and to conduct underwater combat, mining and clearance diving. These units include combat swimmers tasked to protect ships and other fleet assets from enemy frogmen and foreign special forces. The precise composition, activities and location of the unit are strictly classified.

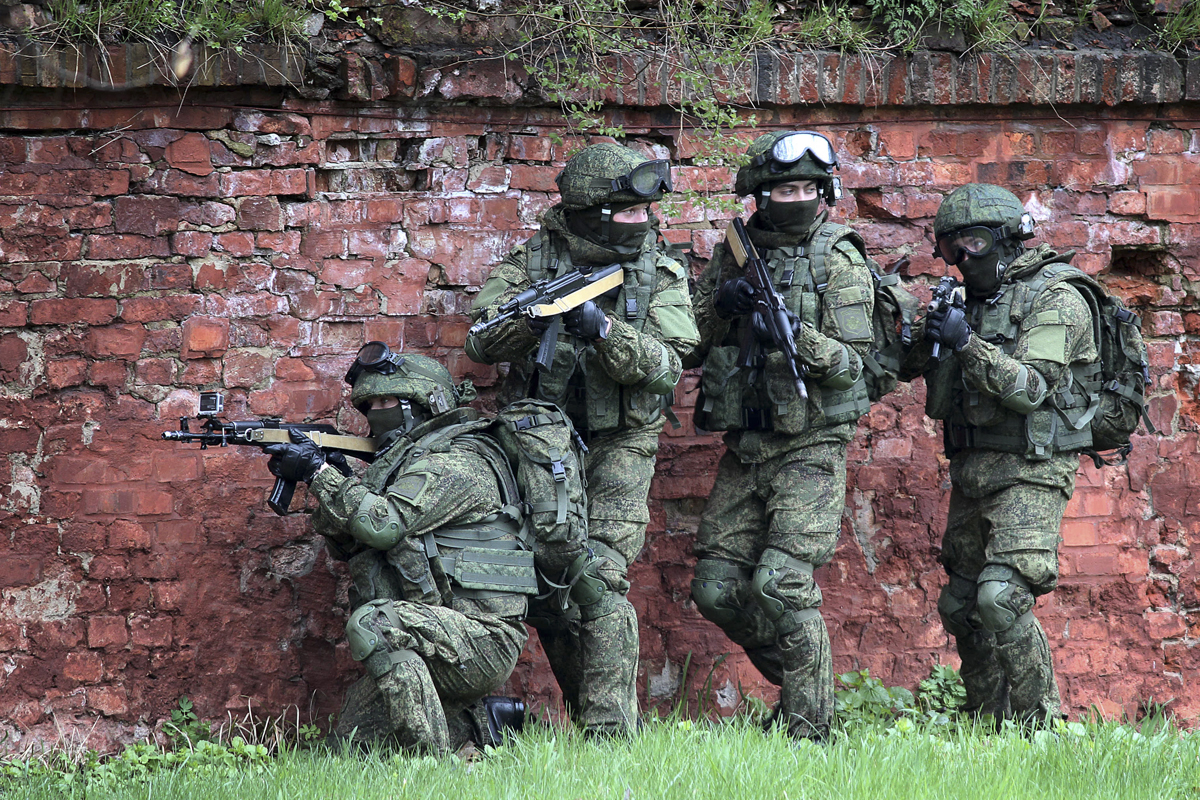
Combat swimmers of the 313th PDSS conduct land operations.

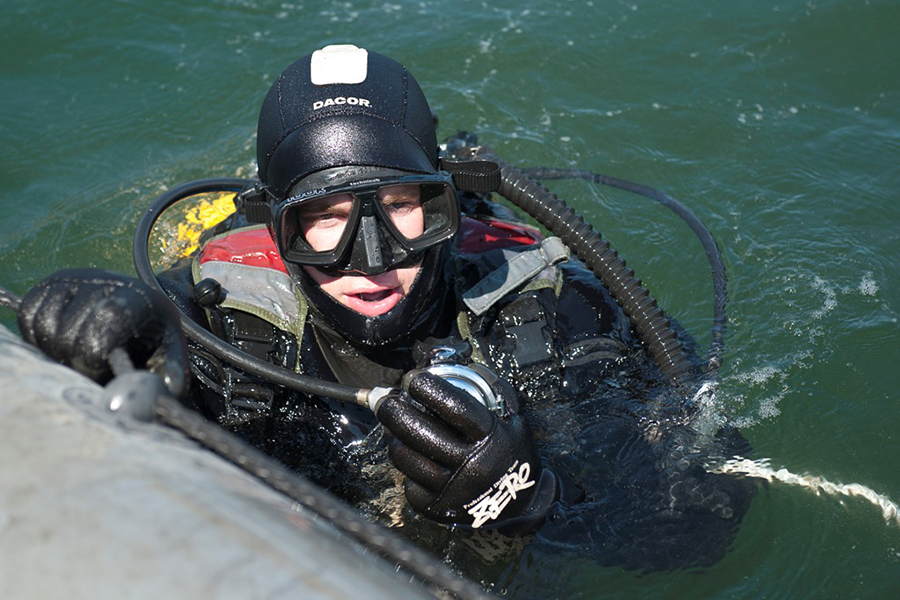
Combat swimmer from the 311th PDSS in Kamchatka (2017).

Every PDSS unit has approximately 50–60 combat swimmers.

- 101st PDSS Detachment – based in Petropavlovsk-Kamchatsky
- 102nd PDSS Detachment – based in Sevastopol
- 136th PDSS Detachment – based in Novorossiysk
- 137th PDSS Detachment – based in Makhachkala
- 140th PDSS Detachment – based in Vidyayevo
- 152nd PDSS Detachment – based in Polyarny, Murmansk Oblast
- 153rd PDSS Detachment – based in Ostrovnoy, Murmansk Oblast
- 159th PDSS Detachment – based in Razboynik
- 160th PDSS Detachment – based in Murmansk
- 269th PDSS Detachment – based in Gadzhiyevo
- 311th PDSS Detachment – based in Petropavlovsk-Kamchatsky
- 313th PDSS Detachment – based in Sputnik
- 473rd PDSS Detachment – based in Kronstadt

=== Terminology ===
- Reconnaissance diver (Водолаз разведчик, tr: Vodolaz razvedchik) is a Russian term for members of a special purpose unit of the Russian or Soviet Naval Spetsnaz – SpN VMF (СпН ВМФ).
- Combat swimmer (Боевой пловец, tr: Boyevoy plavets) is a Russian term meaning members of special purpose anti-sabotage divers' units. The public media and others who do not serve in the Russian and/or Soviet Naval Spetsnaz, sometimes use this term unofficially for meaning.
- Naval spetsnaz man ( Морской спецназовец, tr: Morskoy spetsnazovets) is an unofficial Russian term for meaning.

== Equipment ==
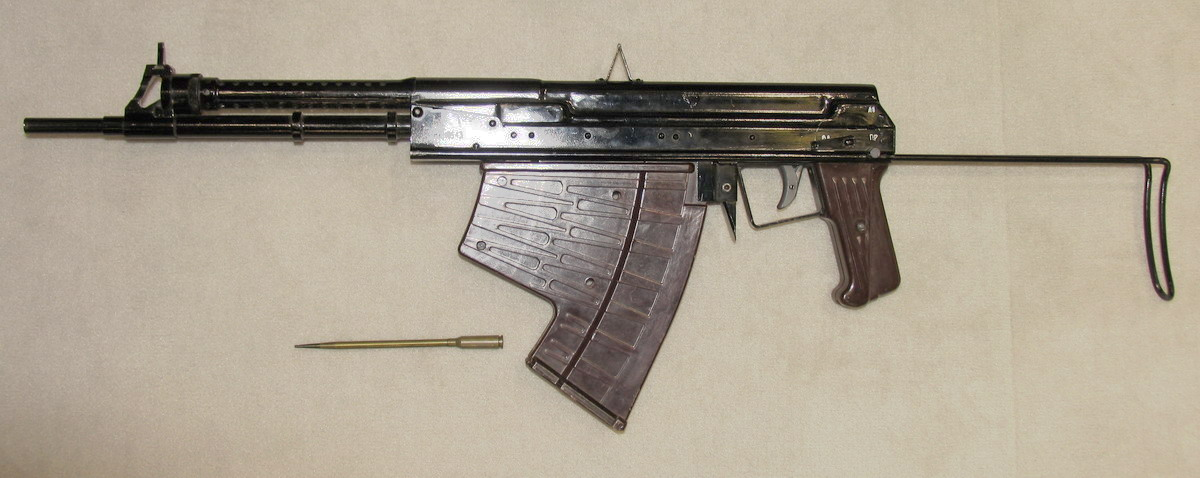
Russian frogmen issued APS Underwater Assault Rifle

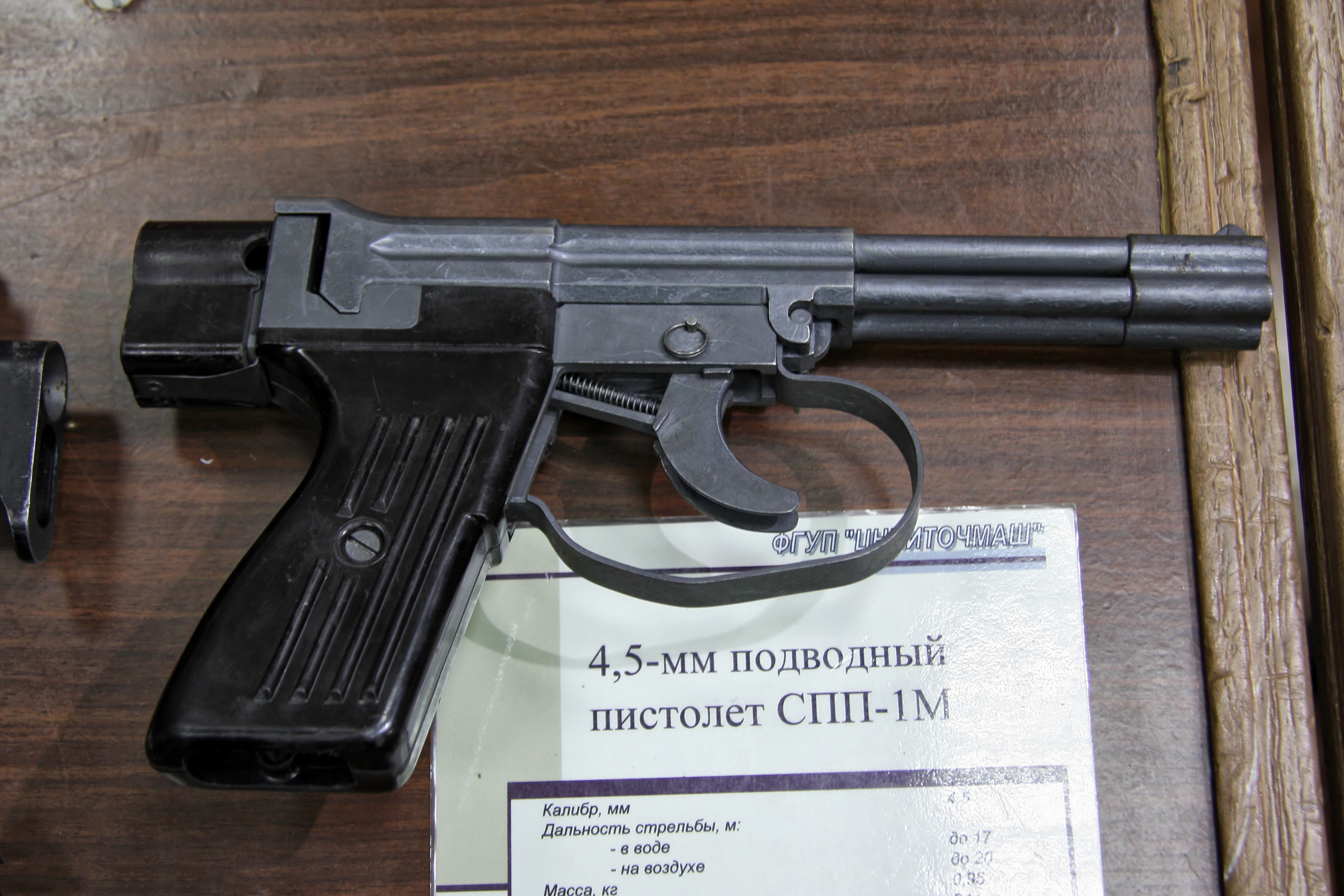
Russian frogmen issued SPP-1 Underwater Pistol

Russian frogmen use this equipment among others:

- IDA Rebreathers: For example, the IDA71.
- "Piranha" midget submarine, can carry six frogmen and their equipment.
- 2-man torpedo of the "Siren" type that can be launched through an ordinary submarine's torpedo tube. It is longer than a British or Italian Chariot because it has two warheads.
- "Triton-1" midget submarine, which can carry two combat divers.
- "Triton-2" midget submarine, which can carry six combat divers.
- APS Underwater Assault Rifle.
- SPP-1 Underwater Pistol.
- Protei-5 and similar one-man underwater diver-carriers.
- «PPV» underwater tablet for divers

== Known operations ==
=== World War II ===
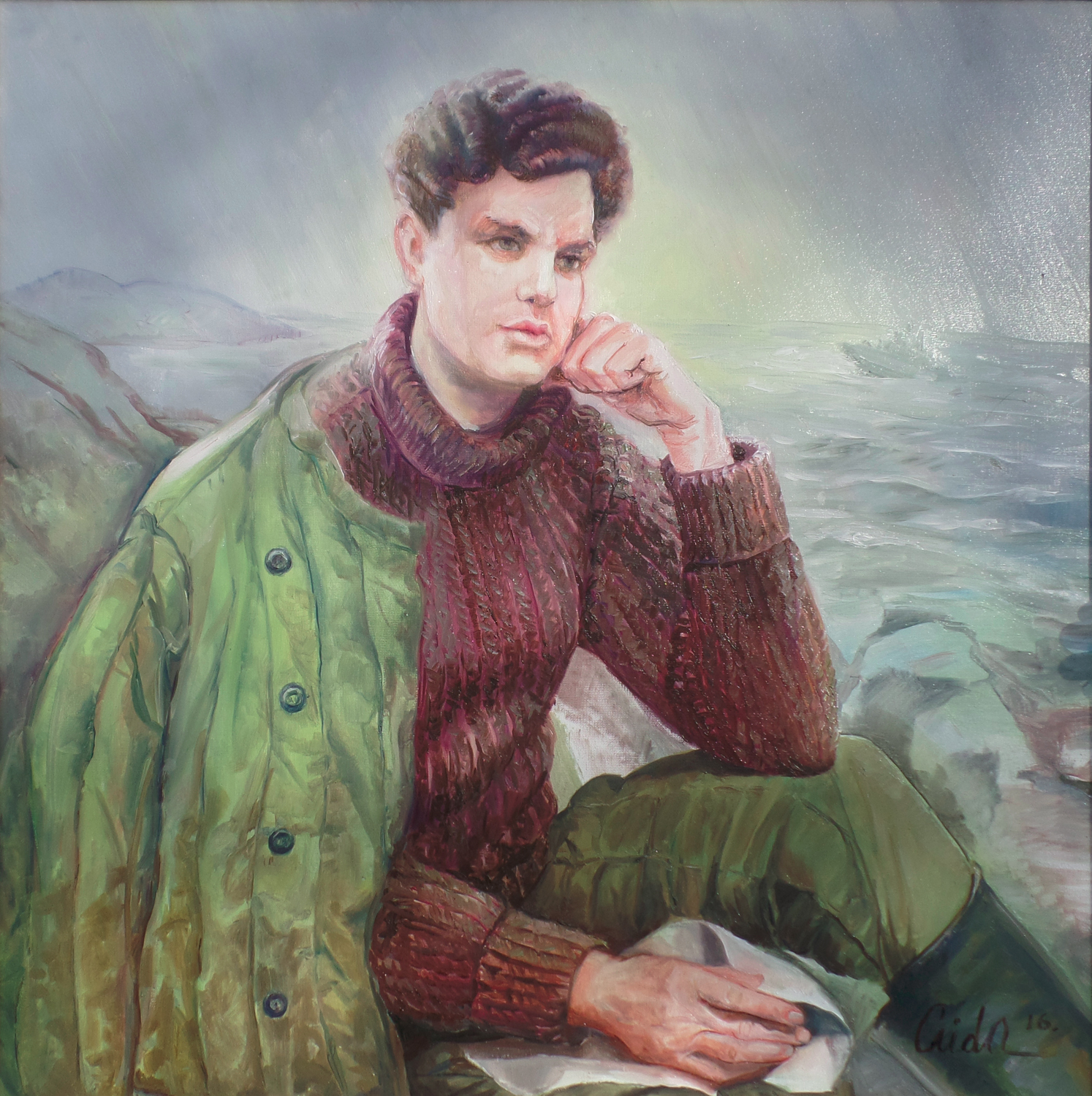
Viktor Leonov helped lay the foundation of modern day naval operations for Soviet Union and Russia.

Soviet combat divers were quite successful during World War Two. They performed a variety of missions numbering well over 200 operations. Some of the operations were:

- 1940–1941 Soviet female diver Dina Guseva performed rescue missions in the Volga river near Bakalda.
- 11 August 1941: RON (рота особого назначения, Rota Osobogo Naznacheniya; Company of Special Designation), a Soviet combat frogman unit, was set up on Goloday Island (which is now called Dekabristov Island), near Leningrad. Its commander was Ivan Vasilyevich Prokhvatilov.
- August 1941: Two RON frogmen towing a sea mine, demolished a bridge over the river Narva which German forces had reached.
- September 1941: During the Finnish army's invasion of the area around Lake Ladoga, Finnish forces took an island south of Vyborg, isolating 23 Soviet units who were in Vyborg port. Two RON frogmen swam to the island, laying a guide cable as they went. 50 RON frogmen followed this cable, landed and found that the Finns had removed parts from their guns and abandoned the island, perhaps because they had seen the Soviet preparations.
- In those early days RON made its own equipment, including adapting army breathing sets for underwater use; they did not use 'fins' until the end of the 1950s.
- 23 September 1941: 270 German aircraft attacked the Soviet naval base at Kronstadt near Leningrad. The Soviet frogmen sank the transport vessel "Barta" opposite the Peterhof. The ship sat on the seabed but remained partly out of the water.
- September 1941: Prokhvatilov decided to use the "Barta" wreck as an observation post. They saw that the Germans had built a pier at Staraya Peterhof, and stacked piles of naval mines by it. RON frogmen towed two naval mines to the pier and destroyed it. The Germans did not rebuild it.
- Early October 1941: start of frogman training in the Soviet Pacific Fleet.
- 1941–1943, winters: RON men patrol the supply road over the ice of frozen Lake Ladoga.
- September 1941: Soviet frogmen conducted crossing operations at Nevskaya Dubrovka. These crossings involved equipment, weapons, ammunition, and food. People crossed from the right bank to the bridgehead as well.
- August 1942: Nine Soviet divers conducted an operation unloading a large barge sunk by the Germans with 10,000 machine pistols on board in a little more than a week in the Volga river around Stalingrad.
- 1942: Soviet frogmen clashed with German frogmen at a Tsemes Bay seaport at Novorossiysk. The skirmish resulted in some knife battles underwater.
- 1942: Approximately 37 Soviet frogmen destroyed a German military outpost on the western shore of the Don River. The outpost numbered as much as a reinforced platoon.
- August–September 1942: Soviet divers conducted operations to extract sunken materials from the bottom of the Don River. Some of these materials included three half pontoon floats, several motor vehicles and their loads, twelve boxes of ammunition, and one vehicle with aircraft bombs.
- 1943: During the liberation of Taman Soviet frogmen conducted operations on the Crimean shore.
- 1943: Soviet frogmen participated in landings at Malaya Zemlya and at Myskhako. At Malaya Zemlya the frogmen constructed moorages for a tank crossing while under enemy machine gun fire and bombardment.
- 1943: Soviet divers conducted operations constructing moorages for land craft at Kerch Bay while under attack from enemy aircraft.
- 1943: Soviet frogmen, led by Viktor Khokhlov, blew up a railroad bridge across the Dnieper River that the Germans were actively using to concentrate their forces toward the front line at the Battle of Kursk.
- September 1943: During the siege of Leningrad, a group of combat swimmers of a RON unit entered the German naval base at Strelna and destroyed Italian combat boats of the Decima Flottiglia MAS.
- Soviet EPRON Diver K.D. Zolotovskiy claims his Soviet frogman team had underwater skirmishes with German frogmen in the Svir River.
- April 1944: ROON (a unit like RON), was formed in the Soviet Black Sea fleet.
- July 1944: Combat swimmers of RON completed underwater work on board the German submarine U-250, which had been sunk by the Soviet anti-submarine ship MO-103. Some secret documents and a new type of acoustic torpedo were found. Some key components of this T-5 G7es torpedo were subsequently given to British naval specialists by the Soviet forces. German aircraft and torpedo boats tried to interrupt the diving operation. Negotiations between the Soviet and British sides over the T-5 acoustic torpedo are depicted in the book "The Way to Victory" written by Soviet admiral N.G. Kuznetsov.
- July 1944: Soviet frogmen conducted a commando landing on Rukhnu island.

=== Cold War ===
- October 1945: RON and ROON and all similar organizations were officially disbanded.
- July 1946 to the beginning of 1950; and 29 May 1952: discussions in the USSR about the need for combat frogmen.
- 24 January 1953: A conference in the USSR confirmed that combat frogmen were needed.
- 1953: The first naval combat divers' unit, the 6th OMRP, was established in the Black Sea fleet.
- 1954: Scuba divers' or frogmen's footprints were found on a beach near a sanatorium used by the Soviet state party elite. This caused a security alarm, motivating the USSR to form a combat frogman unit.
- 15 October 1954: The naval combat divers' unit, the 561st OMRP, was established in the Baltic Sea.
- April 1956: The Lionel Crabb underwater spying incident and the Soviet warship Ordzhonikidze caused a security alarm and pushed the USSR towards forming a combat frogman unit.
- According to Jan Willem Bech's site, Soviet oxygen rebreathers, whose manufacturing codes end in two digits, of-which the lowest such number is 51, (the IDA-51). The characteristic metal backpack-box (like the one the IDA-71 has), seems to be first definitely known is the LVI-57. The LVI-57 shown on Jan Willem Bech's site was made in 1964. Sometimes with Soviet products (as with the AK-47 rifle) these numbers indicate when that make came into production, e.g. the IDA-71 in 1971.
- June 1967: When the Six-Day War between Israel and Arab nations took place, some Soviet ships were in Port Said. This showed naval commanders that their ships in the Eastern Mediterranean were well protected from air attack, but were not properly protected from frogman attacks. As a result, Soviet naval commanders decided to form the PDSS.
- 1967: PDSS (Anti-diversionary forces and means), began development in the Soviet Black Sea Fleet. PDSS is a complex of special measures developed by the Soviet Navy to counter possible attacks by frogmen. PDSS includes specially trained units (teams) of the Soviet Navy, frogman and anti-frogman training and special weapons and tactics. According to some historians, Soviet Naval Commanders decided to form PDSS after the Lionel Crabb incident.
- 1968: The 6th OMRP was transformed into the 17th Detached Brigade for Special Purposes.
- 1969: PDSS Frogman units were formed in the Soviet Pacific, Baltic and Northern fleets.
- 1970 and after: frogmen from the OB PDSS operated in Angola, Vietnam, Egypt, Mozambique, Nicaragua, Ethiopia and other places, often at the request of the nation that they operated in. They went to Angola and Nicaragua to protect Soviet ships and to consult local armed forces.
- Soviet frogmen protected a USSR trade commission who were visiting a place on the coast of Africa. They saw, fought against and drove off a group of six or eight South Africa combat frogmen in an underwater battle. There were no deaths.
- Soviet frogmen killed some trained anti-frogman dolphins in an incident off Nicaragua.
- 1986–1987 Russian small boat teams attempted to steal U.S. guidance systems at the Kwajalein Missile Range. CIA Operative Billy Waugh was assigned to investigate the situation.
- 1989: Mikhail Gorbachev and George H. W. Bush met on board the Soviet ship Maksim Gorkiy near the coast of Malta. For three days, frogmen from the Baltic Fleet, including Spetsnaz men from the 561 OMRP and Osnaz, protected the ship.
- 1990: The 17th OBrSpN was transformed into the 1464th OMRP.

=== Russian Federation ===
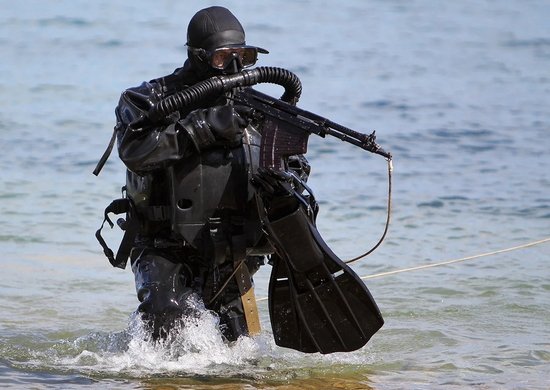
Russian commando frogman from a special detachment for combating underwater sabotage forces and means (PDSS) of the Caspian flotilla during exercises

- January–May 1995: Several seamen, midshipmen, warrant officers and officers from different OMRPs took part in the First Chechen War as volunteers. They were included in naval infantry units and operated as conventional marines in reconnaissance units, not as a separate Spetsnaz unit.
- 2004: The Russian state-controlled Channel One showed a documentary film dedicated to some Spetsnaz operations which were not known to the general public. The film is called Spetsnaz: the Operations. Among other stories, the film depicted an episode about the tactics of Russian combat swimmers from a PDSS unit. The episode was based on a real incident that occurred a few years earlier in a Russian naval base. Agents of a Russian PDSS team had detected activity of foreign frogmen. According to the film's narrator, these frogmen were well-trained professionals who planned to accomplish a terrorist act inside the base as a Russian warship was arriving in harbour. The intruders had recruited a local man as a source of information. They planned to destroy a pier, together with the relatives of naval officers and sailors, by the remote detonation of a special mine. During fast and bloody combat, all the foreign frogmen were killed; their weaponry, explosive devices and diving equipment were captured by the PDSS team.
- 12 August 2008: During the Russo-Georgian War, combat swimmers of the Russian Black Sea Fleet successfully demolished Georgian torpedo boats and missile boats inside Poti harbour.
- February–March 2014: During the annexation of Crimea, combat swimmers of the Russian Black Sea Fleet stationed at Sevastopol were activated and told to prepare for any planned operations, respond to any immediate naval threats from Ukrainian forces and to fully secure the peninsula from attacks.
- September 2015–November 2016: For a period during the early stages of the Russian military operation in Syria, PDSS combat swimmers of the naval infantry from various fleets of the navy were deployed as part of the contingent of Russian troops deployed in Syria. They participated in many combat missions alongside the Syrian Army.

== Cinema ==
- In the 1945 World War Two film Counter-Attack, Soviet divers are seen constructing an underwater bridge to be utilized for a major Soviet offensive against German forces.

== See also ==
- Coast Guard of the Border Service of FSB RF
- List of military special forces units
