= 5.45×39mm PSP =

Russian underwater rifle cartridge

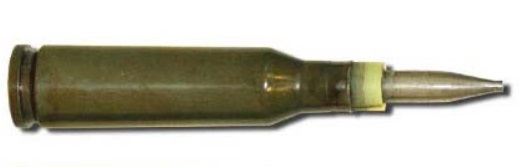
- 5.45×39mm PSP cartridge
- Type: Rifle
- Place of origin: Russia

Service history
- In service: 2005–present
- Used by: Russian Federation

Production history
- Designer: KBP Instrument Design Bureau
- Designed: 2005

Specifications
- Case type: Steel, rimless, bottleneck
- Bullet diameter: <5.60mm (subcaliber)
- Neck diameter: 6.29 mm (0.248 in)
- Shoulder diameter: 9.25 mm (0.364 in)
- Base diameter: 10.00 mm (0.394 in)
- Rim diameter: 10.00 mm (0.394 in)
- Rim thickness: 1.50 mm (0.059 in)
- Case length: 39.82 mm (1.568 in)
- Overall length: 57.00 mm (2.244 in)
- Case capacity: 1.74 cm^{3} (26.9 gr H_{2}O)
- Rifling twist: 255 mm (1 in 10 inch) or 200 mm (1 in 7.87 inch)
- Primer type: Berdan
- Maximum pressure: 380.00 MPa (55,114 psi)

Ballistic performance
Bullet mass/type	Velocity	Energy
16.4 g (253 gr) PSP Tungsten bullet	333 m/s (1,090 ft/s)	909 J (670 ft⋅lbf)
14.5 g (224 gr) PSP-UD Bronze bullet	430 m/s (1,400 ft/s)	1,340 J (990 ft⋅lbf)
- Test barrel length: 418 mm (16.5 in) ADS amphibious rifle

The 5.45×39mm PSP cartridge is a rimless bottlenecked intermediate cartridge. It was introduced into service in 2005 together with ADS amphibious rifle by Russia. This special cartridge was made for underwater use in ADS rifle and based on standard 5.45×39mm.

There are two variants of it. PSP with heavy 16.4g tungsten alloy bullet and PSP-UD with 14.5g bronze bullet. The bullets are saboted and very deeply seated to stay within overall length specs.

== See also ==
List of rifle cartridges

ADS Rifle
