= Vladimir Simonov (engineer) =

Russian military engineer (1935–2020)

Vladimir Vasil'evich Simonov (Владимир Васильевич Симонов; 17 August 1935 — 6 May 2020) was a Russian (Soviet) design engineer working in the Tula Arms Plant.

== Biography ==
Vladimir Simonov was born in 1935 in Kovrov in the Vladimir Oblast.

In 1955 he graduated from the Podolia Industrial Technical Secondary School (Подольский индустриальный техникум) with specialty in mining equipment.

After serving in the army in 1957 he joined the Central Research Institute of Precision Engineering (Центральный научно-исследовательский институт точного машиностроения).

Without leaving productive work, in 1960 he graduated from the Moscow Radio-Mechanical Technical Secondary School (Московский радио-механический техникум) with specialty in radio technologies, and in 1964 the All-Union Correspondence Polytechnic Institute (Всесоюзный заочный политехнический институт), majoring in mechanical engineering.

During his work, he was promoted from technician-designer to lead design engineer. Two products developed by him, the APS underwater rifle and the SPP-1 underwater pistol, have been adopted and manufactured in quantity, and one product is currently in trial operation along with the design of the research.

== Awards and titles ==
For large national and economic importance of its development he has been awarded the title of Honored Inventor of Russia and State Prize Laureate of the Soviet Union.
