= ADS amphibious rifle =

Russian bullpup assault rifle for combat divers

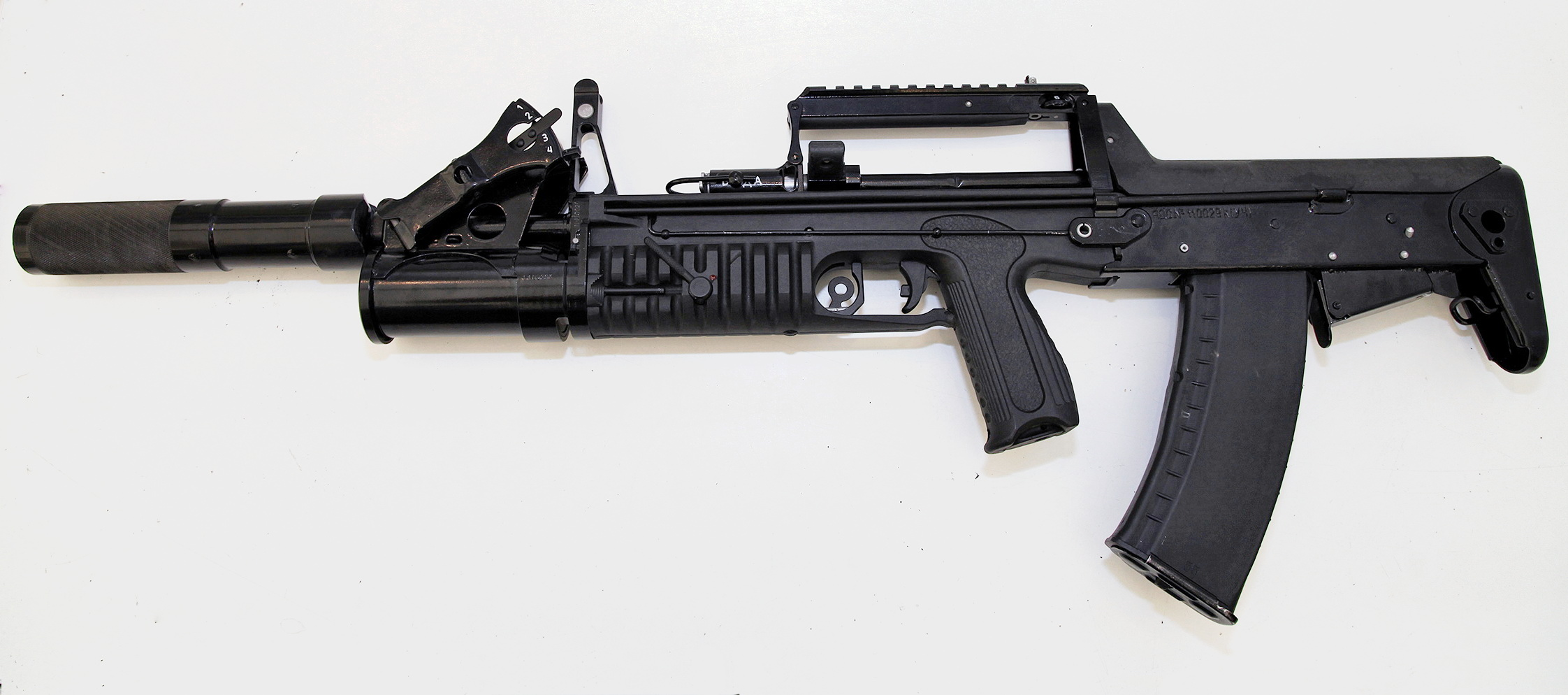
- The 5.45mm ADS rifle
- Type: Bullpup amphibious assault rifle
- Place of origin: Russia

Service history
- In service: 2013–Present
- Used by: Russia

Production history
- Designer: KBP Instrument Design Bureau
- Designed: 2007
- Manufacturer: KBP Instrument Design Bureau
- Produced: 2013

Specifications
- Mass: 4.6 kg
- Length: 685 mm
- Barrel length: 418 mm
- Cartridge: 5.45×39mm M74 7N6 / 7N10 / 7N22 for above-water fire 5.45×39mm PSP for under-water fire 40 mm caseless (grenade launcher)
- Caliber: 5.45mm
- Action: Gas-operated, rotating bolt
- Rate of fire: 700 rpm
- Muzzle velocity: 900 m/s with the above-water fire cartridges
- Maximum firing range: 500 m
- Feed system: 30-round AK-74 detachable box magazine, 45-round RPK-74 box magazine, 60-round AK-200 compatible casket magazine
- Sights: Iron sights, Picatinny rail exists for mounting red dot/night/optical sights

The ADS (Russian: АДС - Автомат Двухсредный Специальный - Special Dual-environment Automatic rifle) is a Russian assault rifle specially made for combat divers. It is of a bullpup layout and is chambered in the 5.45×39mm M74 round. The ADS can adapt a suppressor and optical sights.

== History ==
For several decades, Soviet and then Russian combat divers and naval commando units were armed with special weapons for underwater combat, including the SPP-1 pistol and APS underwater assault rifle. The main drawback of these weapons is that their effectiveness (and life expectancy) for use above the water is severely degraded compared to standard 'above water' weapons. Therefore, combat divers and other Spetsnaz units, when engaged in amphibious operations (below the water and above), had to carry on the mission two types of weapons - one for underwater use and another for use when on shore or on board of enemy surface vessels. The first known attempt to produce a single weapon which could be effectively used either below or above the water was the ASM-DT experimental 'dual-medium' or amphibious assault rifle, developed in Tula around 2000.

The main problem with ASM-DT was that it still had to use long, specially designed underwater ammunition when submerged, which necessitated an overlong receiver, complicated magazine well of adjustable size and two types of magazines. This was found unsuitable for combat use, and further development commenced at the famous arms development facility KBP (Instrument Design Bureau) in Tula. By 2005, the design team at KBP has successfully developed effective underwater ammunition which retains the compact size of the standard issue 5.45×39mm rounds, and thus can be loaded and fired from standard AK-74-type box magazines, and, more importantly, fired from the same chambers and barrels that would accept the 'above-water' ammunition.

== Design ==
The rifle was designed by Russia's Tula Instrument Design Bureau. It is equipped with a 40 mm grenade launcher which has a range of 400 m and fires various modifications of VOG-25 grenade (no mention is made of grenades for underwater use). The weight of the gun including the grenade launcher and without sight is approximately 4.6 kg. The weapon uses 5.45×39mm bullets and fires at a firing rate of 700 rounds per minute with a range on land of 500 m. The weapon's effective underwater firing range when using the specially designed cartridge is about 25 meters at a depth of 5 meters and 18 m at a depth of 20 m (the underwater cartridge very similar in external appearance to the standard 5.45×39mm ammunition except for a different specially calculated bullet shape). The length of the bullet is 53.5 mm compared to an overall cartridge length of 57 mm. Fired cartridge extraction to the forward makes ambidextrous shooting convenient and reduces gas pollution in the face of the shooter region.

== Trials and adoption ==
The ADS was under extensive field trials by undisclosed units of Russian Naval special forces. It will replace APS underwater weapons and, possibly, some AK-74M general issue assault rifles in service with Russian Navy special operation units and other Russian special forces, which might be engaged in underwater operations (security, counter-terrorism in the sea, etc.). It entered service in August 2013.

Rosoboronexport signed a contract with one of the CIS countries for the supply of ADS. As of September 2016, ADS entered service with the Russian Ministry of Defence Special Operations Force Command combat divers. Russian MoD released a video where ADS amphibious rifle is seen being used underwater by Russian Submarine Forces, during one of their defense drills.

The Russian armed forces has received the first batch of ADS amphibious assault rifles in December 2019.

== Gallery ==
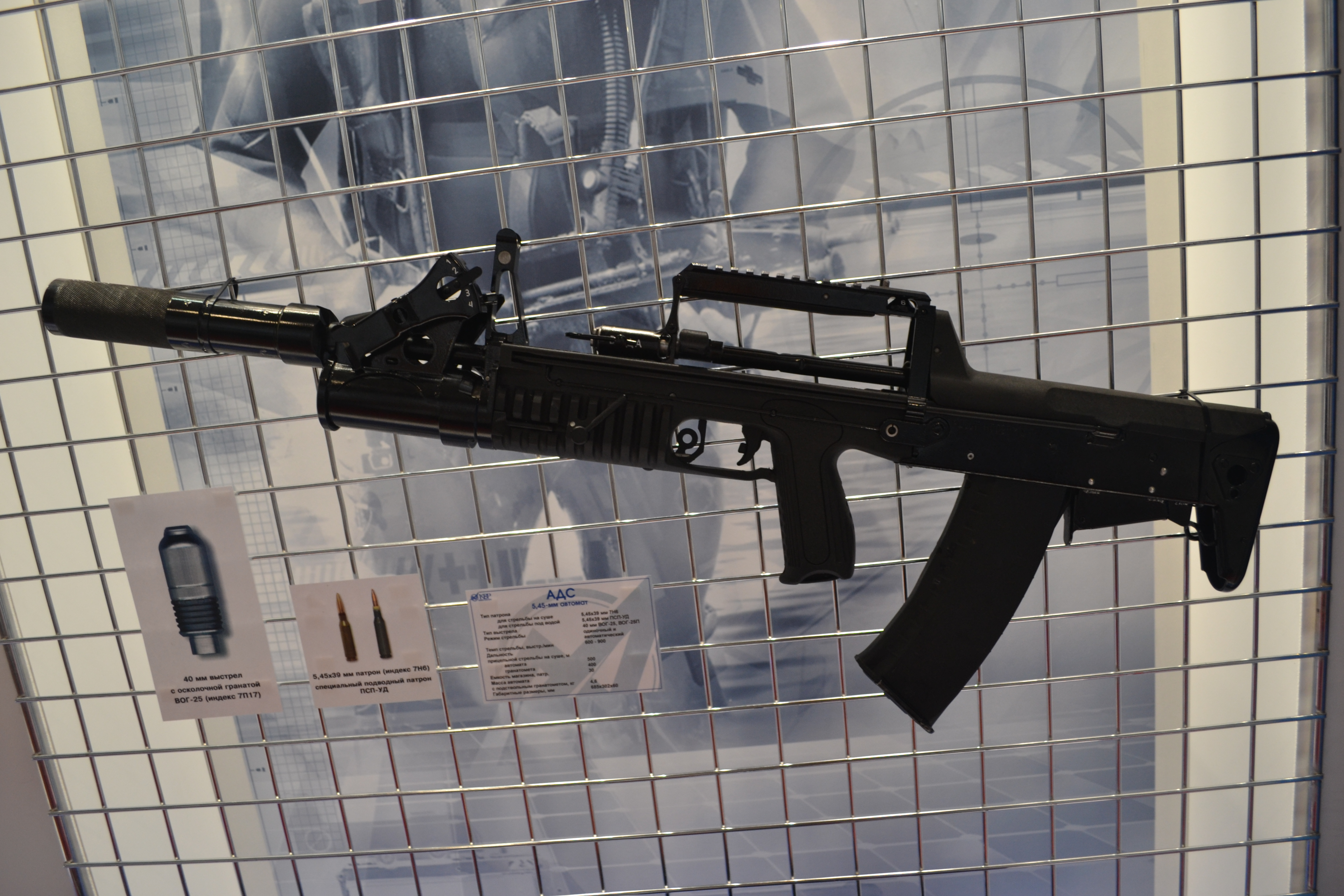
Another picture of the ADS amphibious rifle.

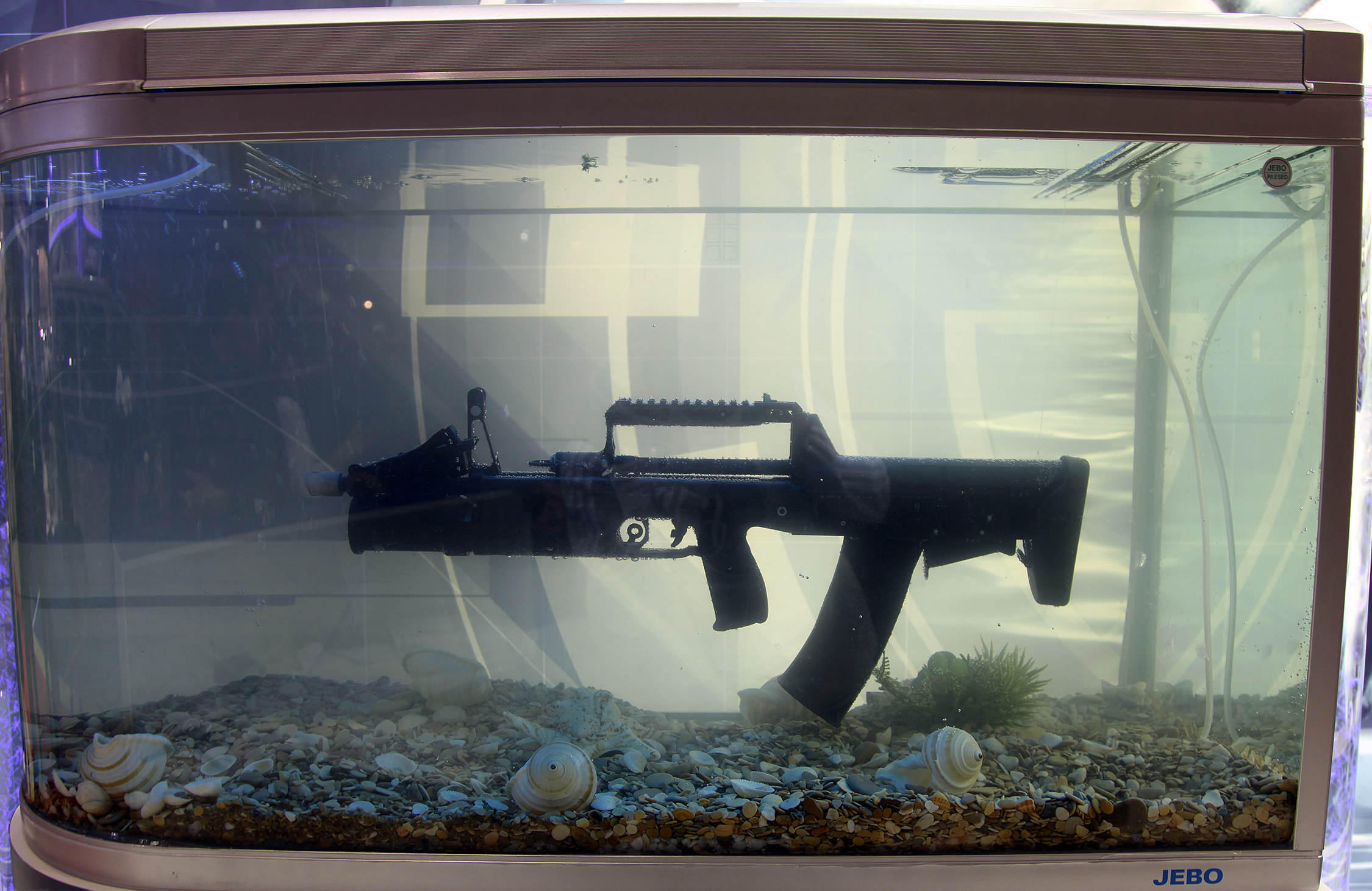
The ADS amphibious rifle placed underwater at Interpolitex 2013.

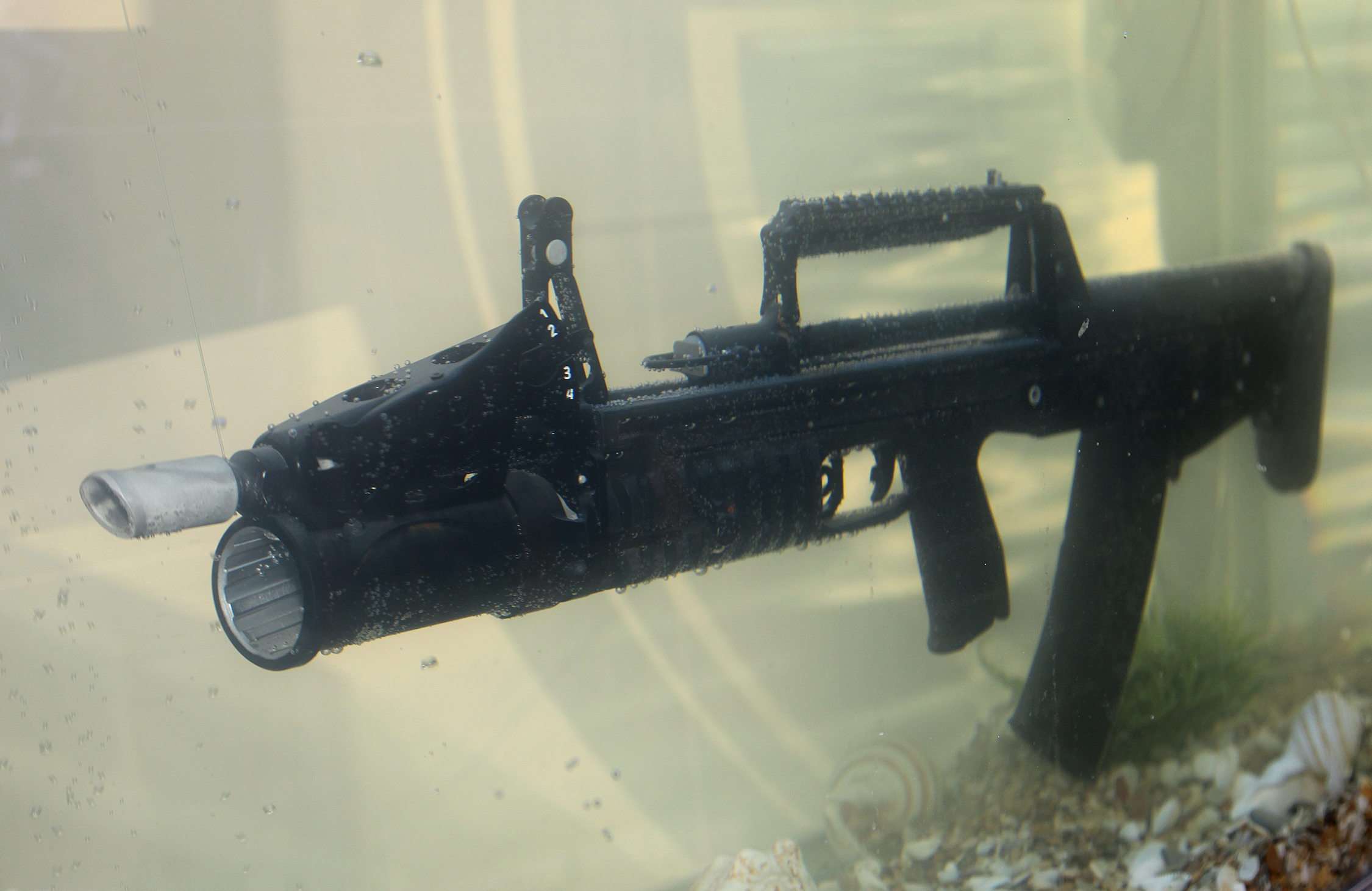
Another angle of the rifle placed underwater at Interpolitex 2013.

== Users ==
- North Korea - Produced locally without license.
- Russia

== See also ==
- A-91 – Russian bullpup assault rifle
