= Heckler & Koch P11 =

Five-barreled underwater rocket dart pistol

HK P11
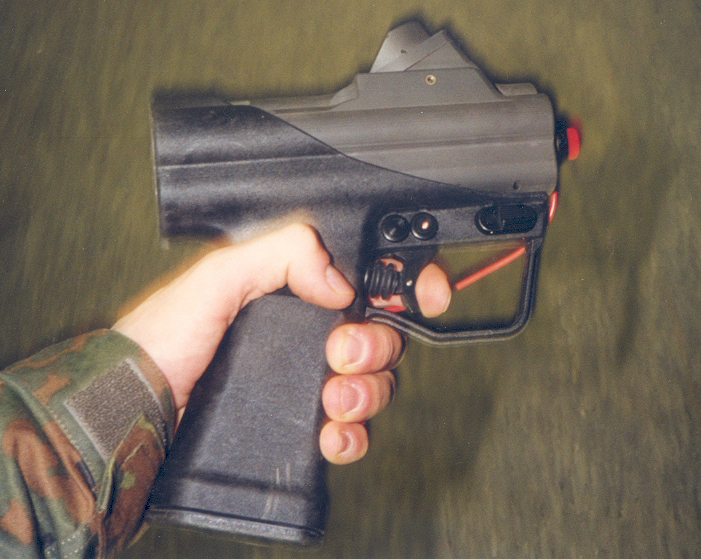
- OS P11
- Type: Underwater Pistol
- Place of origin: Germany

Service history
- In service: 1977–present
- Used by: see Users

Production history
- Designed: 1970s
- Manufacturer: Heckler & Koch
- Produced: 1976

Specifications
- Mass: 1,200 grams (42 oz) loaded Battery pack 700 grams (25 oz)
- Length: 200 millimetres (7.9 in)
- Width: 60 millimetres (2.4 in)
- Cartridge: 7.62×36mm, about 100 millimetres (3.9 in) long, miniature solid-fuelled rocket with fins
- Caliber: 7.62 mm
- Action: Electric actuated
- Effective firing range: 30 metres (98 ft) in air, 10 to 15 metres (33 to 49 ft) underwater
- Feed system: 5 rounds, each in a barrel
- Sights: 14.6 centimetres (5.7 in) between sights

The Heckler & Koch P11 is an underwater firearm developed in 1976 by Heckler & Koch. It is loaded using a pepper-box-like assembly, containing five sealed barrels each containing an electrically-fired projectile. Two styles of barrel assembly can be used: one containing five 7.62×36mm flechette darts for use underwater, or five 133-grain bullets for use above water.

== Design ==
Since ordinary-shaped rounds are inaccurate and have a very short range when used underwater, this pistol fires steel darts underwater or traditional bullets above water. It has five barrels, each of which is loaded with a cartridge, giving the gun a pepper-box appearance, and it is electrically ignited from a battery pack in the pistol grip.

Both the underwater dart and above-water bullet barrel assemblies use a sabot to hold the projectile. Each barrel is rifled in two portions: an initial large diameter designed to spin the sabot and projectile, and a second, narrower section to halt the sabot and spin the projectile. This has two principal benefits: first, it reduces the noise produced when the weapon is fired and second it reduces exhaust gas released by the weapon that would otherwise cause bubbles.

After firing all five cartridges, the barrel unit must be sent back to its manufacturer for reloading. It is very similar to its predecessor, the Mk 1 Underwater Defense Gun. In the past, Heckler & Koch has denied knowledge of its existence.

This firearm is somewhat bulkier than its Soviet counterpart, the SPP-1 underwater pistol, but it has five barrels, as opposed to the Soviet firearm which has four. However, the SPP-1 does not need to be sent back to the manufacturer to be reloaded.

== Users ==
- Denmark
- France
- Germany: German commando frogmen.
- Israel
- Italy: Italian Navy COMSUBIN.
- Malaysia: Pasukan Khas Laut (PASKAL) of the Royal Malaysian Navy
- Netherlands
- Norway
- Pakistan
- United Kingdom: Special Boat Service of the British Royal Navy.
