= AAI underwater revolver =

Six-round amphibious revolver for naval use

AAI amphibious revolver
- Type: Revolver
- Place of origin: United States

Production history
- Designer: Irwin R. Barr; John L. Critcher
- Designed: 1967
- Manufacturer: AAI Corporation

Specifications
- Feed system: Six round cylinder

The AAI underwater revolver is an amphibious firearm intended for naval use. The weapon was designed by Irwin R. Barr and John L. Critcher and uses a six-round cylinder inside a jacket covered by a float.
