= APS underwater rifle =

Soviet underwater assault firearm firing unrifled steel flechettes

APS
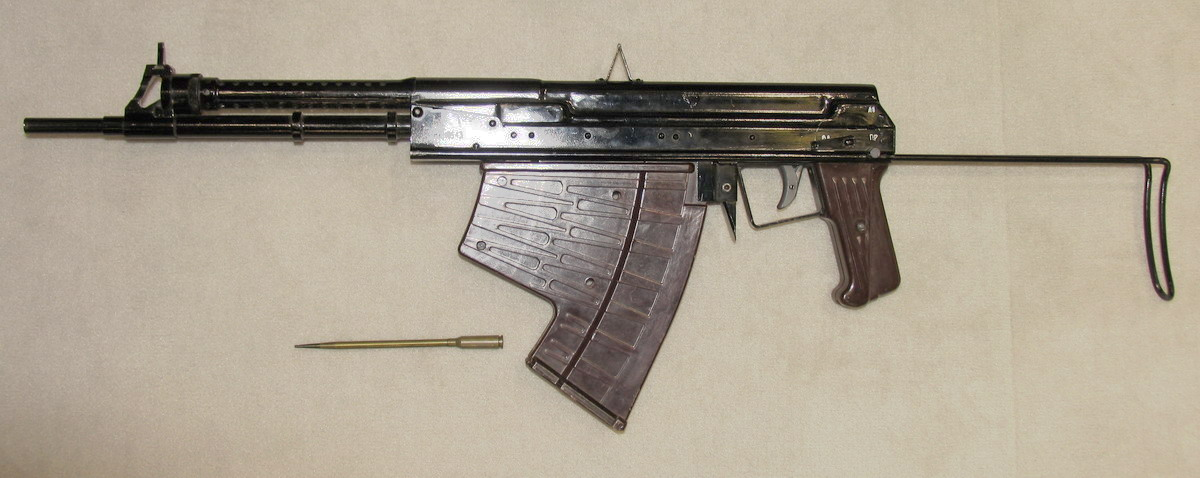
- APS underwater rifle with 5.66-mm cartridge
- Type: Underwater Assault rifle
- Place of origin: Soviet Union

Service history
- In service: 1975–present

Production history
- Designer: Vladimir Simonov
- Designed: 1970s
- Manufacturer: Tula Arms Plant, TsNIITochMash
- Produced: 1975–present

Specifications
- Mass: 3.0 kg empty 3.9 kg loaded
- Length: 840 mm with stock extended 620 mm with stock retracted
- Barrel length: 300 mm
- Width: 65 mm
- Cartridge: 5.66×39mm MPS with 5.66×120mm steel darts and tracer MPST
- Caliber: 5.66mm
- Action: Gas actuated
- Rate of fire: 600 rounds per minute (on land)
- Muzzle velocity: 340–360 meter per second (on land)
- Effective firing range: 30 m at depth 5 m (98 ft at depth 16 ft); 20 m at depth 20 m (66 ft at depth 66 ft); 11 m at depth 40 m (36 ft at depth 131 ft)
- Maximum firing range: 100 m in the air
- Feed system: 26-round detachable Magazine

The APS underwater assault rifle (Russian: Автомат Подводный Специальный, romanized: Avtomat Podvodny Spetsialnyy, lit. 'Special Underwater Assault Rifle') is an underwater firearm designed by the Soviet Union in the early 1970s. It was adopted in 1975. Made by the Tula Arms Plant (Тульский Оружейный Завод, Tul'skiy Oruzheynyy Zavod) in Russia, it is exported by Rosoboronexport.

Under water, ordinary bullets are inaccurate and have a very short range. The APS fires a 120-millimetre-long (4.7 in), 5.66 mm calibre steel bolt specially designed for this weapon. Its magazine holds 26 rounds. The APS's barrel is not rifled; the fired projectile is kept in line by hydrodynamic effects; as a result, the APS is somewhat inaccurate when fired out of water.

The APS has a longer range and more penetrating power than spearguns. This is useful in such situations such as shooting an opposing diver through a reinforced dry suit, a protective helmet (whether air-holding or not), thick tough parts of breathing sets and their harnesses, and the plastic casings and transparent covers of some small underwater vehicles.

The APS is more powerful than a pistol, but is bulkier, heavier and takes longer to aim, particularly swinging its long barrel and large flat magazine sideways through water.

== History ==
The rising threat of attacks by frogmen in naval bases caused various anti-frogman techniques to be developed. In the USSR, one of these techniques was guard frogmen sent to stop the attackers. At first these guard frogmen were armed only with knives and AK-type rifles. The rifle was carried in a waterproof case and could be used only on the surface, so the only effective underwater weapon against enemy frogmen was the knife.

The SPP-1 underwater pistol was accepted in 1971, but soon proved to be useful for close-up self-defence rather than in attacking more distant targets. Vladimir Simonov undertook the job of developing an underwater assault rifle.

The APS was adopted in 1975. Afterwards, there was lengthy improvement work on the APS. One improvement was fitting a perforated gas pipe with a special shield to break up the emitted gas bubbles, making targeting easier and reducing the visibility of the bubbles, allowing stealthier firing of the weapon.

In 2021, Rosoboronexport reported the delivery of APS rifles to a foreign country.

Due to the limitations of the APS such as being ineffective when being used outside of water, the ASM-DT was designed to address them.

== Design ==
The initial design of the APS was based on the AK-74. It has a magazine capacity of 26 rounds.

The first stage of developing the APS was its cartridge. A 5.45-millimetre (0.215 in) by 39-millimetre (1.5 in) cartridge was lengthened by about 115 millimetres (4.5 in) to fit the sharp-fronted steel bolt. Another cartridge version was designed that contained a miniature rocket, which when fired makes a visible streak in the water.

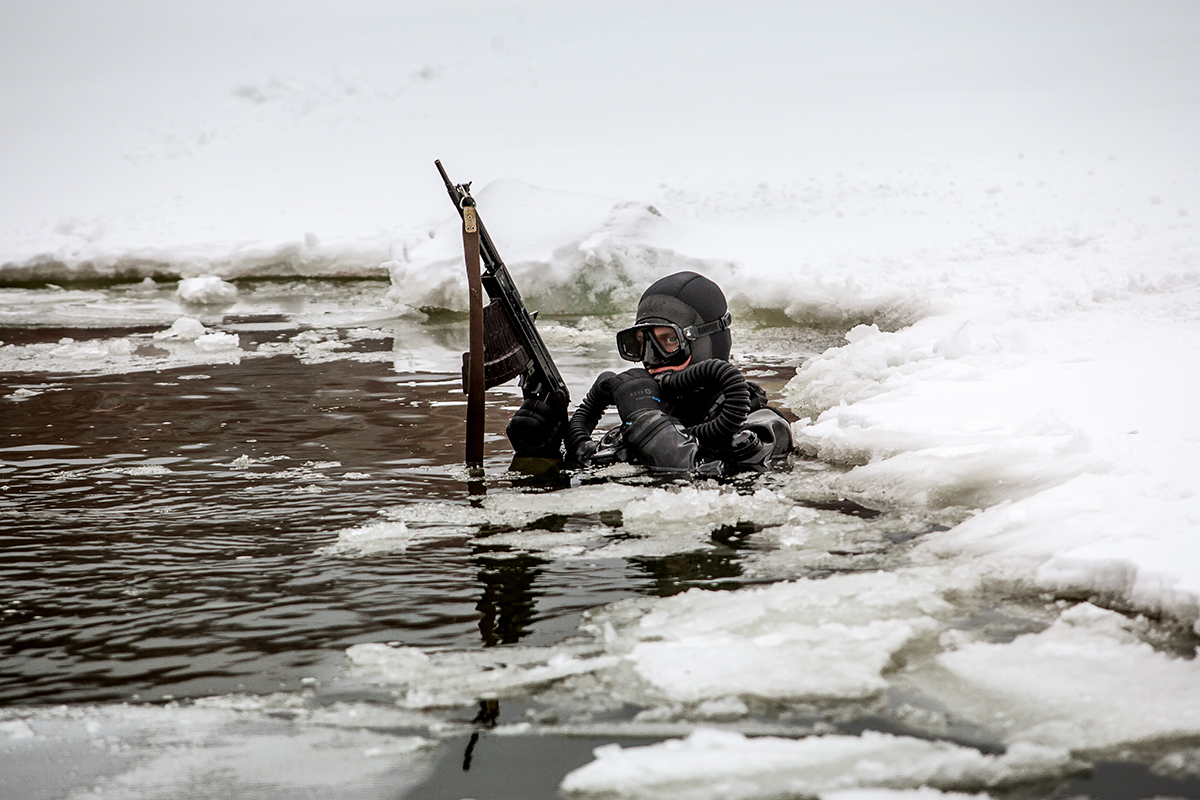
Special Operations Forces operator with an APS rifle

== Users ==
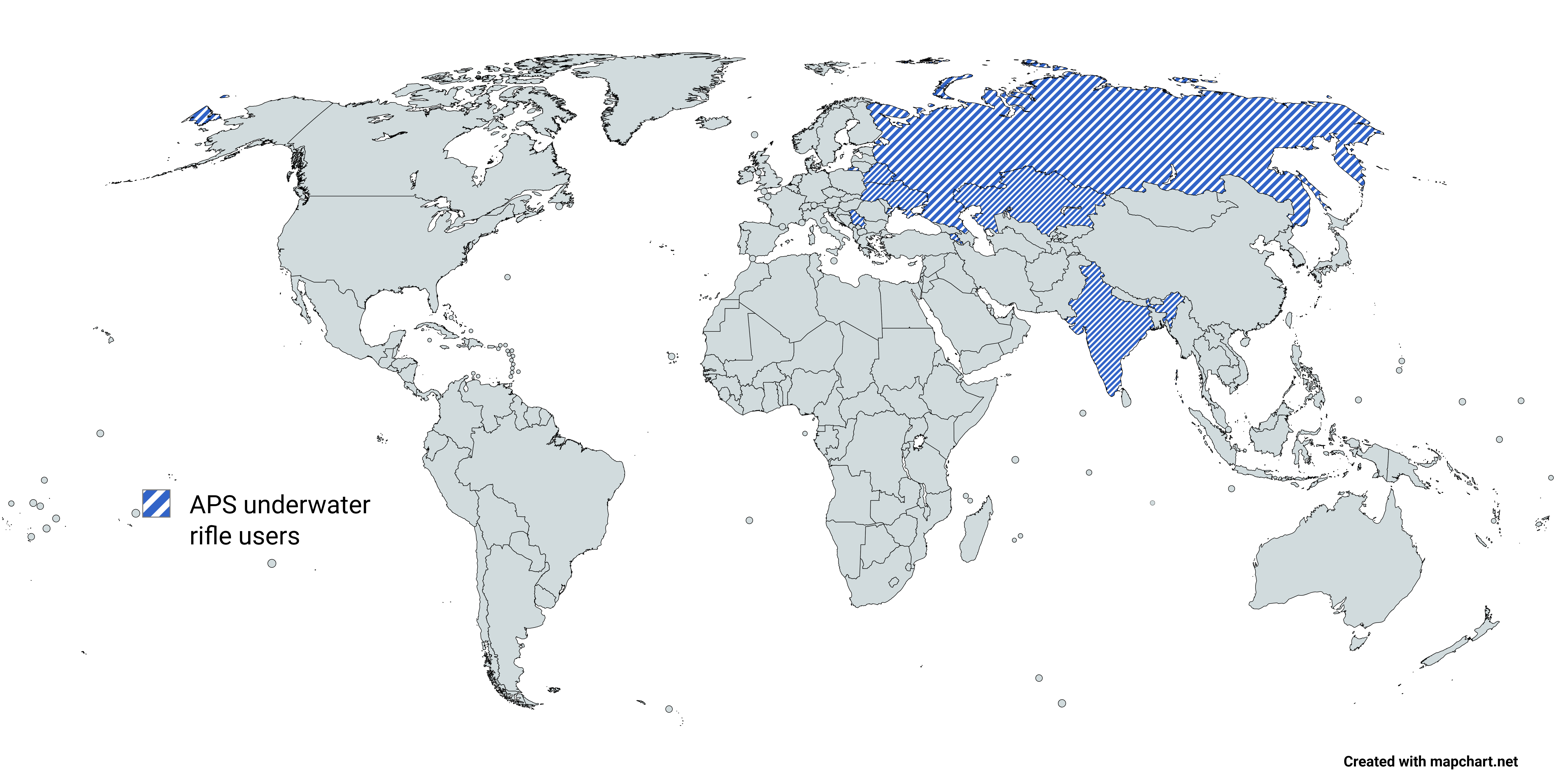
Users of the APS underwater assault rifle

- Azerbaijan
- Belarus
- India: Used by MARCOS commandos.
- Kazakhstan
- Russia
- Serbia: by the 82nd River Underwater Demolition Company of the 72nd Brigade for Special Operations
- Ukraine

== See also ==
- ADS amphibious rifle – Russian bullpup assault rifle for combat divers
- ASM-DT amphibious rifle – Russian folding stock underwater firearm
- QBS-06
- Underwater firearm – Firearms that can be effectively fired underwater

== Bibliography ==
- Piotr Taras „Strzałki” dla płetwonurków, Komandos 9/93. ISSN 0867-8669.
- Zbigniew Gwóźdź, Strzały pod wodą, Komandos 7/8/96. ISSN 0867-8669.
- Leszek Erenfeicht, Rosyjska broń strzelecka dla płetwonurków, Strzał 5/2003. ISSN 1644-4906.
- Wiktor Suworow, Specnaz. Historia sił specjalnych Armii Radzieckiej, Wydawnictwo Adamski i Bieliński, Warszawa 1999. ISBN 83-87454-50-8.
- Southby-Tailyour, Ewen (2005). Jane's Special Forces Recognition Guide. New York: Collins. ISBN 0-00-718329-1.
