= Gyrojet =

Firearm firing gyroscopic rockets in the 1960s

- Type: Small arms (rocket launcher)
- Place of origin: United States

Service history
- Used by: Military Assistance Command, Vietnam – Studies and Observations Group
- Wars: Vietnam War

Production history
- Designer: Robert Mainhardt; Art Biehl
- Manufacturer: MB Associates
- Unit cost: $300 (1968)
- Produced: 1962 - 1975
- No. built: less than 2000 globally
- Variants: See Variants

Specifications
- Mass: 0.88 lb (0.40 kg)
- Length: 10.88 in (27.6 cm)
- Barrel length: 5 in (13 cm)
- Cartridge: MKI: 13mm rocket; MKII: 12mm rocket; AR: 6mm rocket
- Caliber: MKI: .51 caliber; MKII: .47 caliber; AR: .24 caliber
- Action: Blowback
- Rate of fire: 60 RPM; Select fire (assault rifle variant)
- Muzzle velocity: Very low, but increasing over trajectory to about 1250 fps
- Effective firing range: 55 yards (50 m)
- Feed system: 6-round internal box magazine (main variants)
- Sights: Iron sights

The Gyrojet is a family of unique firearms developed in the 1960s named for the method of gyroscopically stabilizing its projectiles. Rather than inert bullets, Gyrojets fire small rockets called Microjets which have little recoil and do not require a heavy barrel or chamber to resist the pressure of the combustion gases. Velocity on leaving the tube was very low, but increased to around 1,250 feet per second (380 m/s) at 30 feet (9.1 m). The result is a very lightweight and transportable weapon.

Long out of production, today they are a collector's item with prices for common models ranging above $4,000. They are seldom used; ammunition is scarce and can cost over $800 per round.

== History ==
Robert Mainhardt and Art Biehl joined forces to form MBAssociates, or MBA, in order to develop Biehl's armor-piercing rocket rounds. Originally developed in a .51 caliber, the cartridges were self-contained self-propelled rockets with calibers ranging from .49 and 6mm to 20mm.

A family of Gyrojet weapons was designed, including the pistol, the carbine and a rifle, as well as a proposed squad-level light machine gun and a needlegun known as the Lancejet; however only the pistol and carbine were built. The space age-looking carbines and an assault rifle variant with a removable grip-inserted magazine were tested by the US Army, where they proved to have problems. One issue was that the vent ports allowed humid air into fuel, where it made the combustion considerably less reliable. The ports themselves could also become fouled fairly easily, although it was suggested that this could be solved by sealing the magazines or ports.

Versions of the Gyrojet that were tested were inaccurate, cumbersome, slow loading, and unreliable. At best, a 1% failure rate was suggested; users quote worse figures, with many rounds that misfired the first time but later fired. Possibly these disadvantages could have been overcome in time, but the technology did not offer enough advantages over conventional small arms to survive.

The original designer, Robert Mainhardt, enlisted the help of his friend Nick Minchakievich of Pleasanton, California, before 1962 to improve projectile stability. After rear ignition proved too dangerous, Minchakievich developed a retractable-fin design. The design was tested in 6 mm and 13 mm calibers, but the fins required advanced machining and proved too expensive for production.

Rushed for a solution due to the possibility of large government contracts, Minchakievich then invented diagonal vented ports to make the projectiles or ammunition spin while advancing, stabilizing the projectiles gyroscopically, in the same manner as a rifle. This method was used in all the Mainhardt calibers for the Gyrojet. Minchakievich warned Mainhardt that rushing the project would only make the pistol shoddy and unreliable.

Working for free out of his Livermore Aerospace Plastics Lab, Minchakievich requested six more months to perfect an accurate projectile, and make the Gyrojet more famous than the Colt Peacemaker. Mainhardt and the Air Force declined as current ordnance and technology was in demand for Vietnam. Minchakievich even attempted a marketing strategy by enlisting the help of Gene Roddenberry in using the pistol on Star Trek. Although Roddenberry loved the Gyrojet, he wanted a "ray gun" and not a pistol that merely shot a rocket projectile, no matter how advanced for the twentieth century.

== Design ==
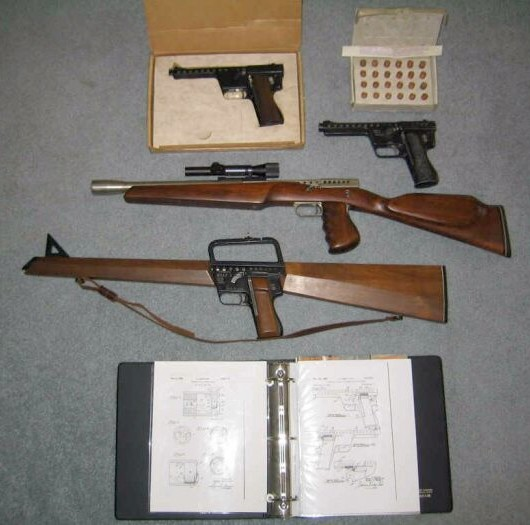
The Gyrojet family: two Gyrojet pistols, a carbine and the rifle. In the top-right corner is a box of 13 mm Rockets, and at the bottom is a diagram book for the guns.

The inherent difference between a conventional firearm and a rocket is that the projectile of a conventional firearm builds up to its maximum speed in the barrel of the firearm, then slows down over the course of its trajectory; the rocket continues to accelerate as long as the fuel burns, then continues its flight like an unpowered bullet. A bullet has maximum kinetic energy at the muzzle; a rocket has maximum kinetic energy immediately after its fuel is expended. The burn time for a Gyrojet rocket has been reported as 1/10 of a second by a Bathroom Reader's Institute book and as 0.12 seconds by "The 'DeathWind' Project".

A firearm's rifled barrel must be manufactured to high precision and be capable of withstanding extremely high pressures; it is subject to significant wear in use. The Gyrojet rocket is fired through a simple straight, smooth-walled tube of no great strength.

Accuracy is increased by spinning the projectile. This is achieved for a bullet by being forced against spiral rifling grooves in the barrel. A rocket does not have enough initial energy to allow stabilization this way. Spin stabilization of the Gyrojet was provided by angling the four tiny rocket ports rather than by forcing the projectile through a rifled barrel. Combustion gases released within the barrel were vented through vent holes in it. Spin stabilization is limited in accuracy as a targeting technique by the accuracy with which one can point the launching tube and the accuracy with which the orientation of the projectile is constrained by the tube. The technique requires the shooter to have a line of sight to the target.

The rocket leaves the barrel with low energy and accelerates until the fuel is exhausted at about 60 feet (18 metres), at which point the 180-grain rocket has a velocity of about 1250 feet per second (380 m/s), slightly greater than Mach 1, with about twice as much energy as the common .45 ACP round. While test figures vary greatly, testers report that there was a sonic crack from some rounds but only a hissing sound from others, suggesting that the maximum velocity varied from slightly below to slightly above Mach 1.

Gyrojet bullet diagram

In 1965, the manufacturer of the pistol claimed 5-mil accuracy (about 17 MOA, or about 4.5 inches at 25 yards), worse than conventional pistols of the time. However, in later tests accuracy proved very poor; the difference seems to have been due to a manufacturing flaw in later production runs which partially blocked one of the exhaust ports, creating asymmetrical thrust that caused the projectile to corkscrew through the air. The Studies and Observations Group (SOG) of the U.S. military in Vietnam in 1967 saw an opportunity to try out one of the SOG's new developments, In one test, a rocket round punched through an old truck door and into a water-filled 55-gallon drum, almost exiting its opposite side. SOG men also test-fired it through sandbag walls and even tree trunks.

About one thousand of the "Rocketeer" model pistols were produced; a few saw service in the Vietnam War and were featured in the James Bond book and movie You Only Live Twice, the Matt Helm film Murderers' Row, and The Man from U.N.C.L.E. novel The Monster Wheel Affair. At about the same general size as the Colt M1911, the Gyrojet was considerably lighter at only 22 ounces (625 g), as the structure was mostly made of Zamac, a zinc alloy. The weapon is cocked by sliding forward a lever above the trigger to pull a round into the gun; the lever springs back when the trigger is pulled. The lever hits the bullet on the nose, driving it into the firing pin. As the round leaves the chamber, it pushes the lever forward again to recock it. The pistol lacks a removable magazine; rounds have to be pushed down from the open "bolt" and then held in place by quickly sliding a cover over them on the top of the gun. Reloading quickly is impossible.

Tests in 2003 claimed that the acceleration, rather than being constant, started at a high value and decreased, leading to velocities at close range which were not as low as expected, about 100 ft/s (30 m/s) at 1 foot (30 cm) instead of the calculated 20 ft/s (6.1 m/s). The testers suggested that the (secret) manufacturing process was designed to achieve this effect. However, independent analysis of those testers' own published data shows that their conclusions were incorrectly calculated. The projectile's acceleration actually started out low and continually increased over the bullet's measured flight.

== Variants ==
=== MKI & MKII ===
The Gyrojet MKI is the original variant of all Gyrojet weapons, being designed in 1962 and tested throughout the Vietnam War in small numbers. While being commercially sold across different markets throughout the mid 1960s, it became very costly to produce the weapon and its ammunition ($200 per round), deterring many potential buyers who were interested in the weapon.

In light of the newly passed Gun Control Act of 1968, any weapon firing an explosive-filled projectile over a half-inch in diameter (.50 caliber) was considered a destructive device and required paying a tax and obtaining a license. As a result of the new laws, the Gyrojet needed to be redesigned to meet legal standards with the 13mm (.51 caliber) rockets passing the hard limit. The Gyrojet MKII was created as a revised version of the Gyrojet MKI with newly fitted 12mm (.47 caliber) rockets to meet standard protocols. However, the registration process was changed several years later with the ATF exempting the 13mm rockets, allowing them to be sold as a standard firearm.

=== Gold Plated Gyrojets ===
Gold Plated Gyrojets (or commonly referred to as a Golden Gyrojet) and its variants are amongst the rarest of all Gyrojet models with approximately less than 150 units ever made throughout their production with variants such as the Gyrojet Carbine being exceptionally more rare than the standard pistol. These weapons are often sought after by collectors alike due to their rarity and value throughout the years.

=== Gyrojet Assault Rifle ===
The Assault Rifle prototype is a unique variant of the Gyrojet with the purpose on reducing weight, sound, and recoil for Infantry troops during the Vietnam war, while potentially increasing range and bullet power compared to conventional firearms. It features many designs and ergonomics from the M16 assault rifle, while also containing a unique detachable box magazine from the grip that isn't seen in other Gyrojet configurations.

Unlike other variants of the Gyrojet which are chambered in 13mm or 12mm rockets, the Gyrojet Assault Rifle would potentially be chambered in new 6mm rocket (.24 caliber) ammunition, known as "Microjets", in order to increase the magazine capacity for infantry troops. During the tests conducted by the US Army, the rifle faced many issues from inaccurate rockets, misfire, and unreliability due to the humidity levels in places such as Vietnam, leaving it as an obscure prototype with few numbers produced.

=== Gyrojet Carbines ===
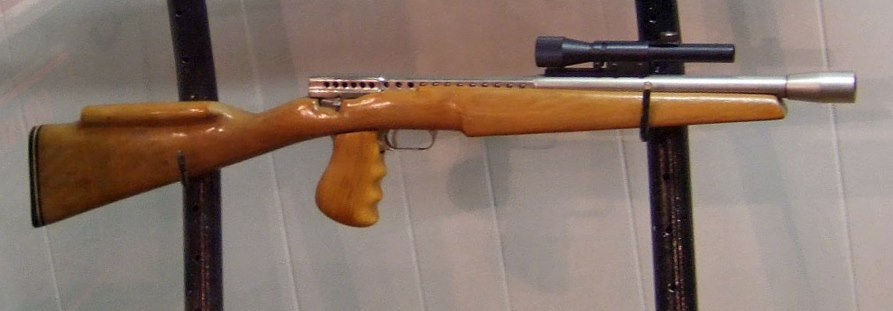
Gyrojet Carbine Model B: Known as the "Sporting Rifle", it features a pistol grip, rifle stock, and scope mount.

An experimental prototype of the Gyrojet that contained a longer 18 inch barrel, and a stock. These prototypes were used to solve the many acceleration issues that were seen in Gyrojet pistols due to rocket activation times by assisting the projectile through a longer barrel, helping the rocket accelerate much faster and travel longer ranges. A second variant known as the Model B, or "Sporting Rifle", was produced, featuring a rifle stock, grip, and an optional scope mount for ranged engagements.

=== Gyrojet Survival 2000 "Derringer" ===
External image
- Image of derringer model at Handguns of the World

Developed in the 1970s as a final effort to save MB Associates from bankruptcy, the Gyrojet Survival 2000 (known as a Derringer pistol) is a modified starting pistol with its upper barrel chambered in Gyrojet ammunition Roughly 20 models were produced of this version. The second variant of the pistol, known as the Gyrojet Survival 2001, was modified to fire Gyrojet ammunition from both of its barrels. Only three models were ever created of this variant, with only one surviving before MB Associates went bankrupt in 1975.

=== Flare launcher ===
The Gyrojet principle was also examined for use in survival flare guns, and a similar idea was explored for a grenade launcher. The emergency-survival flare version (A/P25S-5A) was used for many years as a standard USAF issue item in survival kits, vests, and for forward operations signaling, with flares available in white, green, blue, and red. Known as the gyrojet flare, the A/P25S-5A came with a bandolier of seven flares and had an effective altitude of over 1,500 feet (460 metres). Its rounded-nose projectile was designed to ricochet through trees and clear an over canopy of branches.

=== Gyrojet Lancejet ===
An underwater firearm variant of the Gyrojet called the "Lancejet" was considered for use by the United States military. It was planned and tested but not adopted; the inaccuracy of the weapon eventually removed it from consideration.

=== Gyrojet pepperbox pistol ===
An experimental twelve-barrel Gyrojet pepperbox-type pistol was planned to be used, but was not, in the film version of You Only Live Twice.

== See also ==
- .50 caliber handguns – Heavy handgun bullet/handgun
- Rocket-assisted projectile – Ammunition incorporating rocket propulsion
