= SPP-1 underwater pistol =

Soviet four-barreled underwater dart derringer pistol

SPP-1
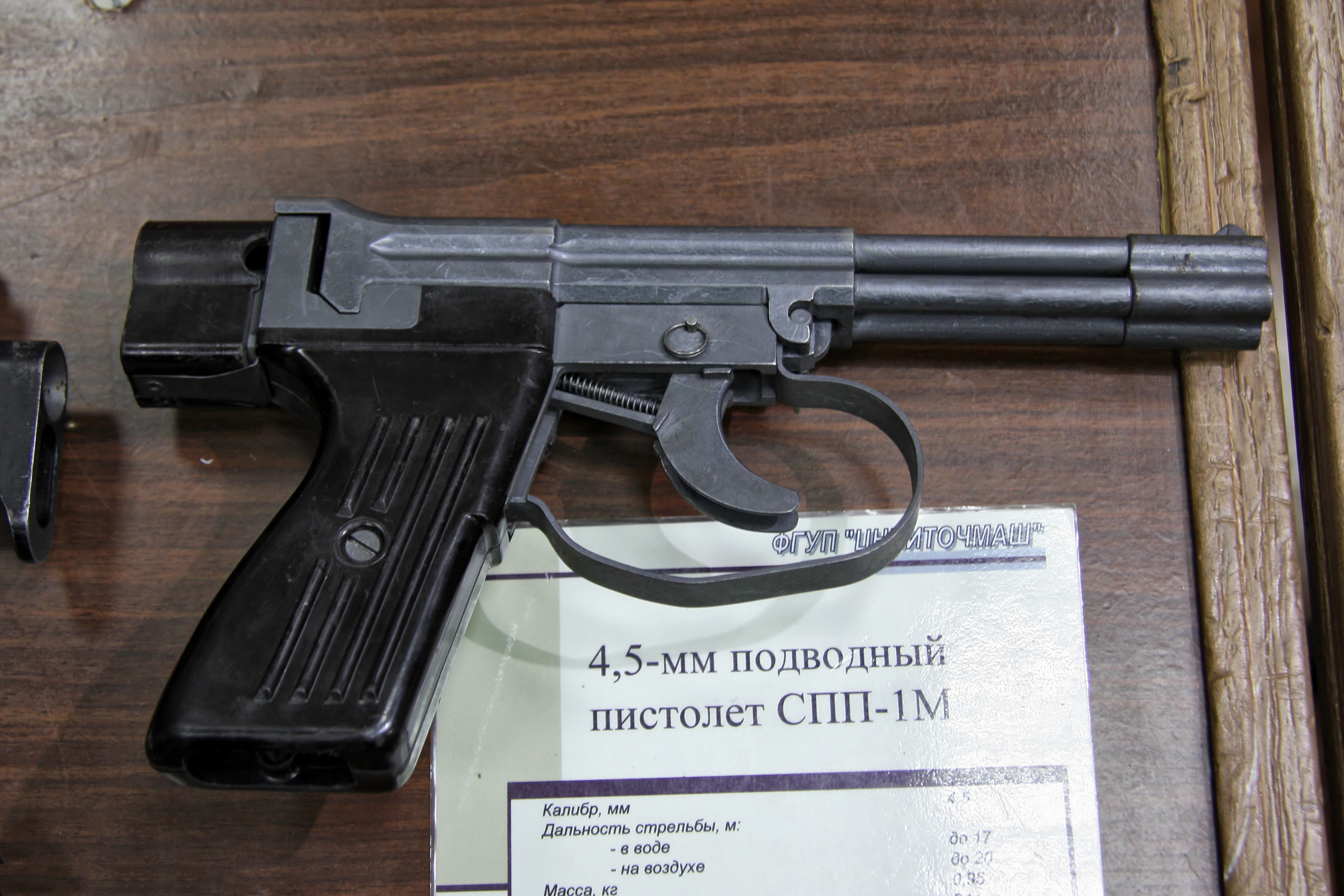
- SPP-1M
- Type: Underwater Derringer Pistol
- Place of origin: Soviet Union

Service history
- In service: 1975–present
- Used by: Russia

Production history
- Designer: Vladimir Simonov at TsNIITochMash - ЦНИИТочмаш (Central Scientific Institute for Precision Machine Building)
- Designed: 1960s (Late)
- Manufacturer: TOZ (Tulsky Oruzheiny Zavod) (Тульский Оружейный Завод); Tula Arms Plant
- Produced: 1971–present
- Variants: SPP-1M

Specifications
- Mass: 950 grams (34 oz) empty, 1,030 grams (36 oz) loaded
- Length: 244 millimetres (9.6 in)
- Width: 37 millimetres (1.5 in)
- Height: 136 millimetres (5.4 in)
- Cartridge: 4.5×40mmR
- Caliber: 4.5 millimetres (0.18 in)
- Action: double action
- Muzzle velocity: 240 to 250 metres per second (790 to 820 ft/s) in air
- Effective firing range: in air, 15 to 20 metres (49 to 66 ft); in water, 17 metres (56 ft) at depth of 5 metres (16 ft); 11 metres (36 ft) at depth of 20 metres (66 ft); 6 metres (20 ft) at depth of 40 metres (130 ft)
- Feed system: 4 barrels with a cartridge in each

The SPP-1 underwater pistol was made in the Soviet Union for use by Soviet frogmen as an underwater firearm. It was developed in the late 1960s and accepted for use in 1975. Under water, standard bullets are inaccurate and have very short range. This pistol instead fires a round-based 4.5 millimetres (0.18 in) caliber steel dart about 115 millimetres (4.5 in) long, weighing 12.8 grams (0.45 oz), which has longer range and more penetrating power than a speargun. The complete cartridge is 145 millimetres (5.7 in) long and weighs 17.5 grams (0.62 oz).

== Design ==
The SPP-1 has four barrels, each containing one cartridge. Its ammunition comes as a magazine of four cartridges which is inserted into the pistol's breech.

Its barrel is not rifled; the fired projectile is kept in line by hydrodynamic effects. As a result, it is somewhat inaccurate when fired out of water.

A double-action firing mechanism fires one cartridge sequentially for each pull of the trigger. When all four cartridges are spent, the gun can be reloaded above or below water.

The SPP-1M pistol is essentially the same as the SPP-1, with the following differences:

- It has an extra spring above the sear to improve the trigger pull.
- Its trigger guard is larger to accommodate diving gloves.

The weapon was designed by Vladimir Simonov, the cartridge by Pyotr Sazonov and Oleg Kravchenko. Simonov also designed the APS amphibious rifle.

== Performance ==
Depth reduces range because the higher pressure closes the cavity sooner. Once the projectile is no longer supercavitating, hydrodynamic drag increases greatly, and the projectile becomes unstable.

Lethal range is defined as the range from which it can easily penetrate a padded underwater suit or a 5 millimetres (0.20 in) thick glass faceplate.

It is manufactured by TOZ (Tulsky Oruzheiny Zavod/ Тульский Оружейный Завод) Tula Arms Plant, and exported by Rosoboronexport, the state agency for Russia's export and import of defense-related products.

== Users ==
- Azerbaijan
- Georgia - In limited use with special operations forces.
- Kazakhstan
- Russia
- Soviet Union
- Ukraine
- Serbia

== Variants ==
The SPP-1M has been copied by Iran.

== See also ==
- Heckler & Koch P11
- List of Russian weaponry
