= WASR-22 =

- Type: Cadet rifle
- Place of origin: Romania

Production history
- Manufacturer: Nova Modul
- Variants: AK-22; AK-22 Trainer; RAK-22

Specifications
- Cartridge: .22 LR
- Action: simple blowback
- Feed system: 10-30 round box magazine
- Sights: Adjustable iron sights, optional mount required for optical sights.

The WASR-22 or AK-22 Trainer is a .22 Long Rifle, semi-automatic cadet rifle loosely based upon the AK-47 and manufactured in Romania by Nova Modul. Unlike the AK-47, it uses a simple blowback method of operation. As such, it has no gas system and the internal components have been modified accordingly.

== Background ==
The use of .22 LR cadet rifles replicating standard service rifles in its dimensions and features is used by many countries for training military, paramilitary and police "cadets" in basic firearms handling and marksmanship. While the WASR-22 was designed to be a cadet rifle for the Romanian Army, it was never used as such. The Romanians abandoned the use of cadet rifles for training army recruits, due to the enormous availability of standard service rifles and ammunition already in stock.

The WASR-22 was sold on the civilian market, primarily in the United States through Century International Arms, and as the RAK-22 through Chiappa Firearms sold in the United States and Europe. Because of its cheap ammo and low recoil, it is marketed as a "trainer AK". It is usually shipped with two 10-round magazines.

== See also ==
- WASR-series rifles
- Pistol Mitralieră model 1963/1965
- Pușcă Automată model 1986
