= Barnaul (disambiguation) =

Barnaul is a city and the administrative center of Altai Krai, Russia.

Barnaul may also refer to:

- Barnaul Urban Okrug, a municipal formation which the city of krai significance of Barnaul in Altai Krai, Russia is incorporated as
- Barnaul Airport, an airport in Altai Krai, Russia
- Barnaul Cartridge Plant, a manufacturer of industrial goods and ammunition in Barnaul, Altai Krai, Russia.
- Barnaul meteorite, a meteorite that fell in Russia in 1904
- Barnaul (inhabited locality), several inhabited localities in Russia
