= Cadet rifle =

Rifle used by military cadets and others for basic firearms and marksmanship training

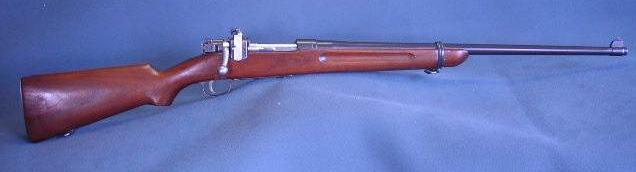
Springfield Model 1922 cadet rifle

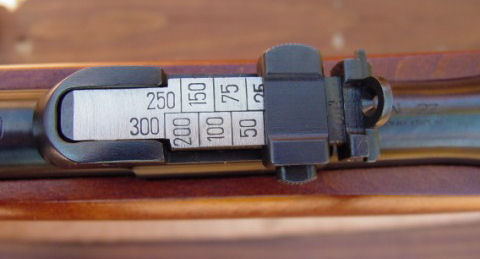
A tangent sight on a CZ 452 rifle, with calibrated markings for ranges out to 300 meters

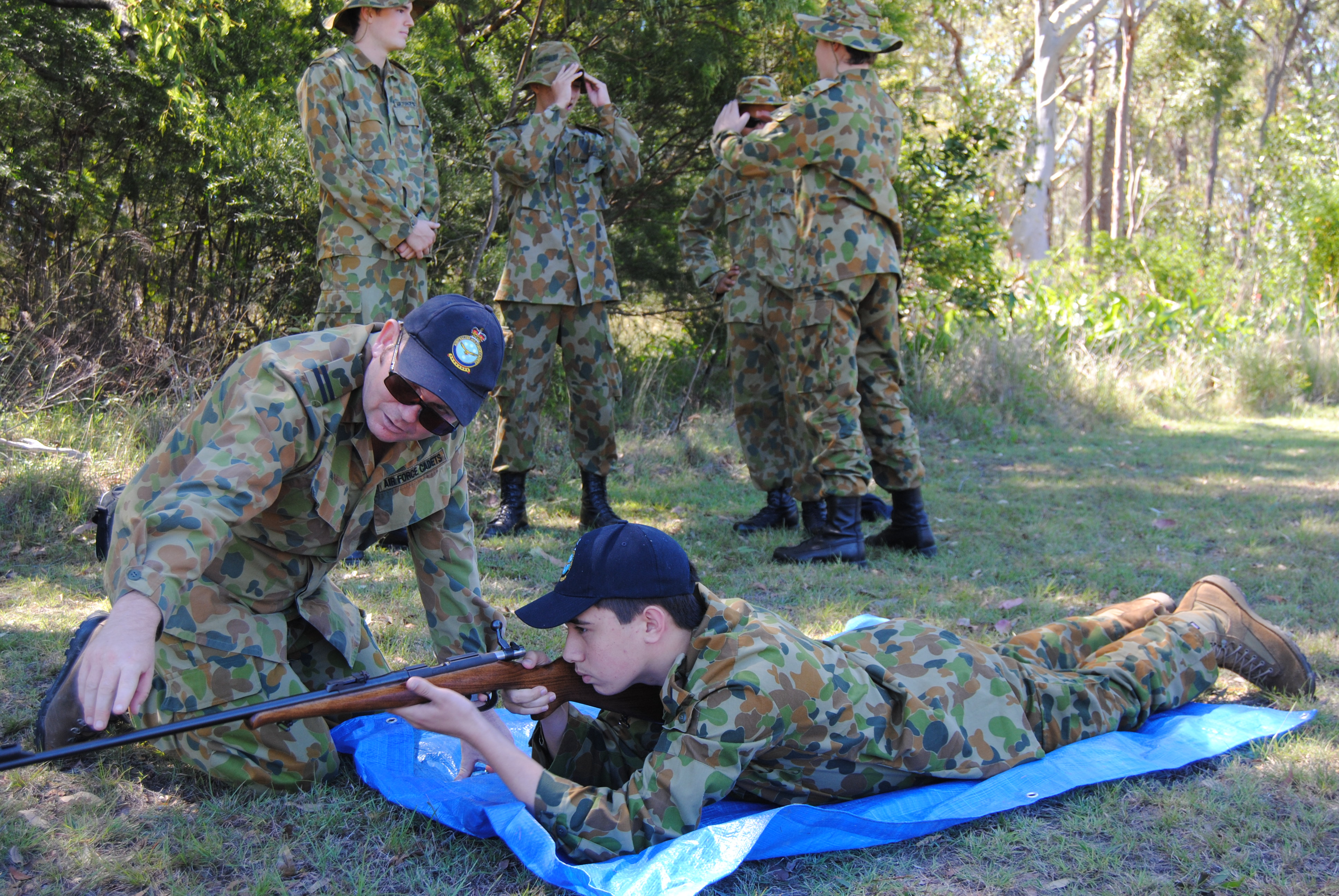
Australian Air Force Cadets using the CZ 452 during firearms training

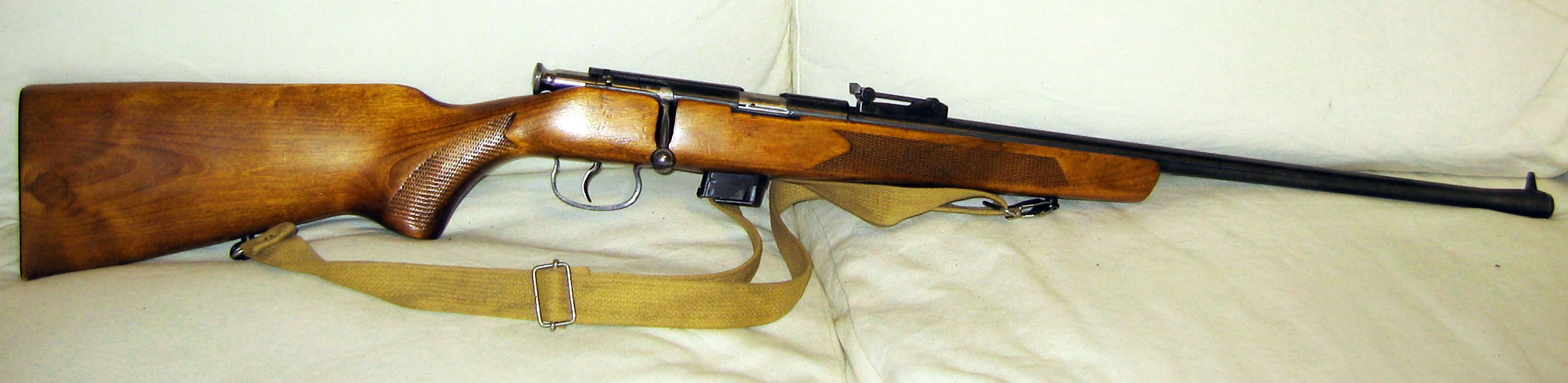
TOZ-17

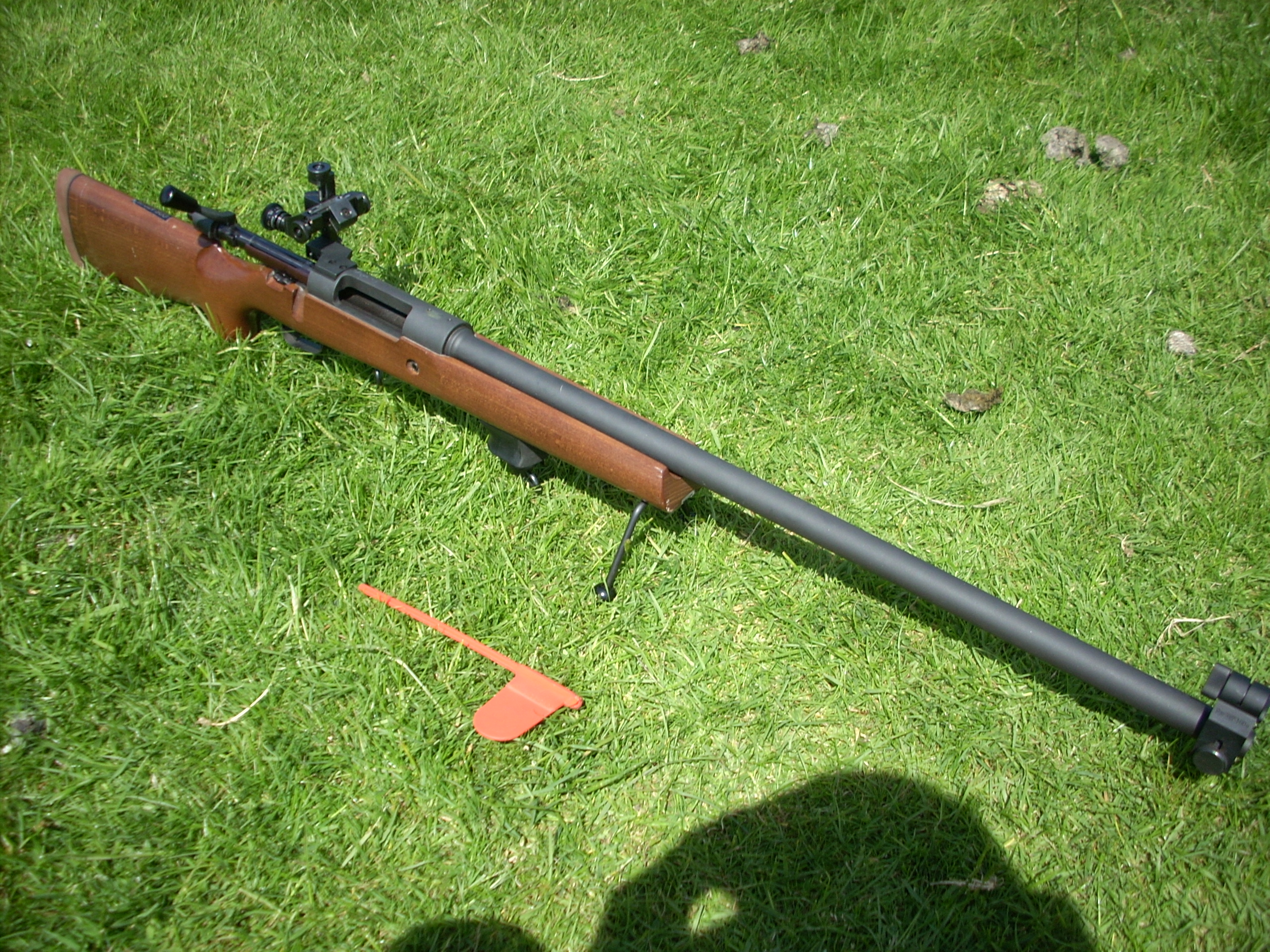
L81 A2 Cadet Target Rifle

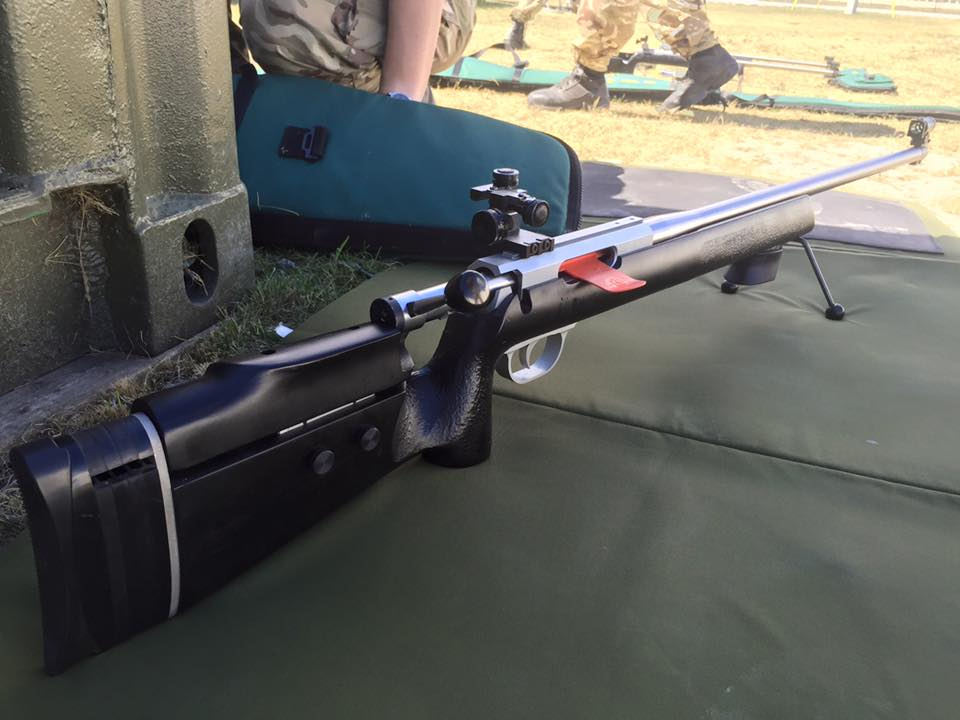
C12A1 Canadian Cadet Target Rifle

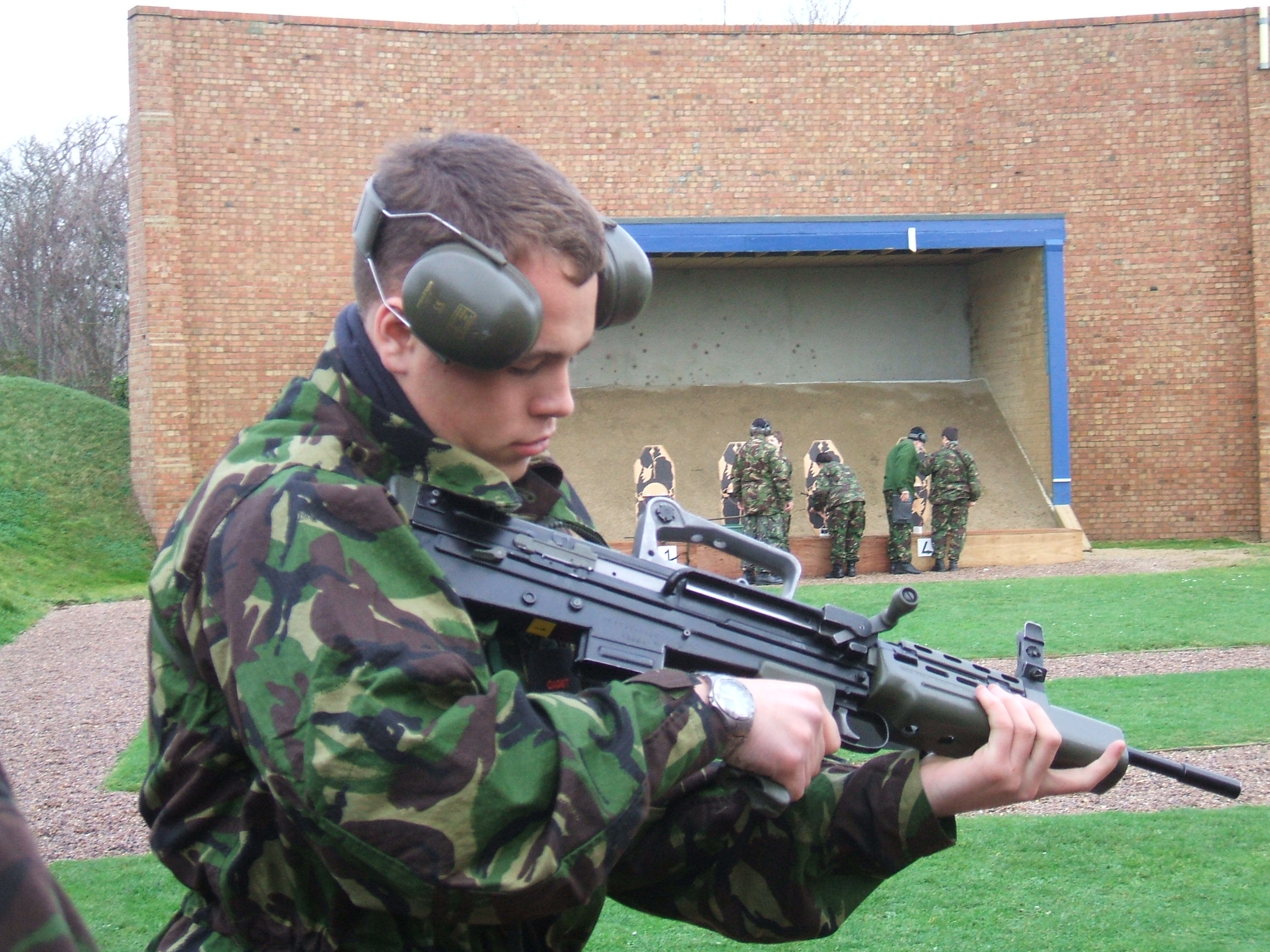
British Sea Cadet with an L98A1 GP

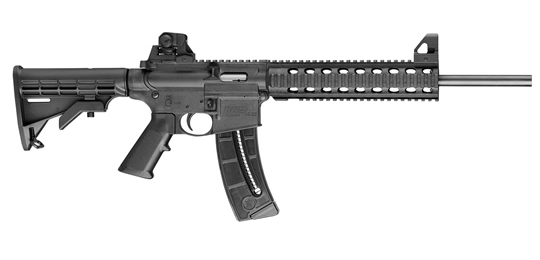
Smith & Wesson M&P15-22

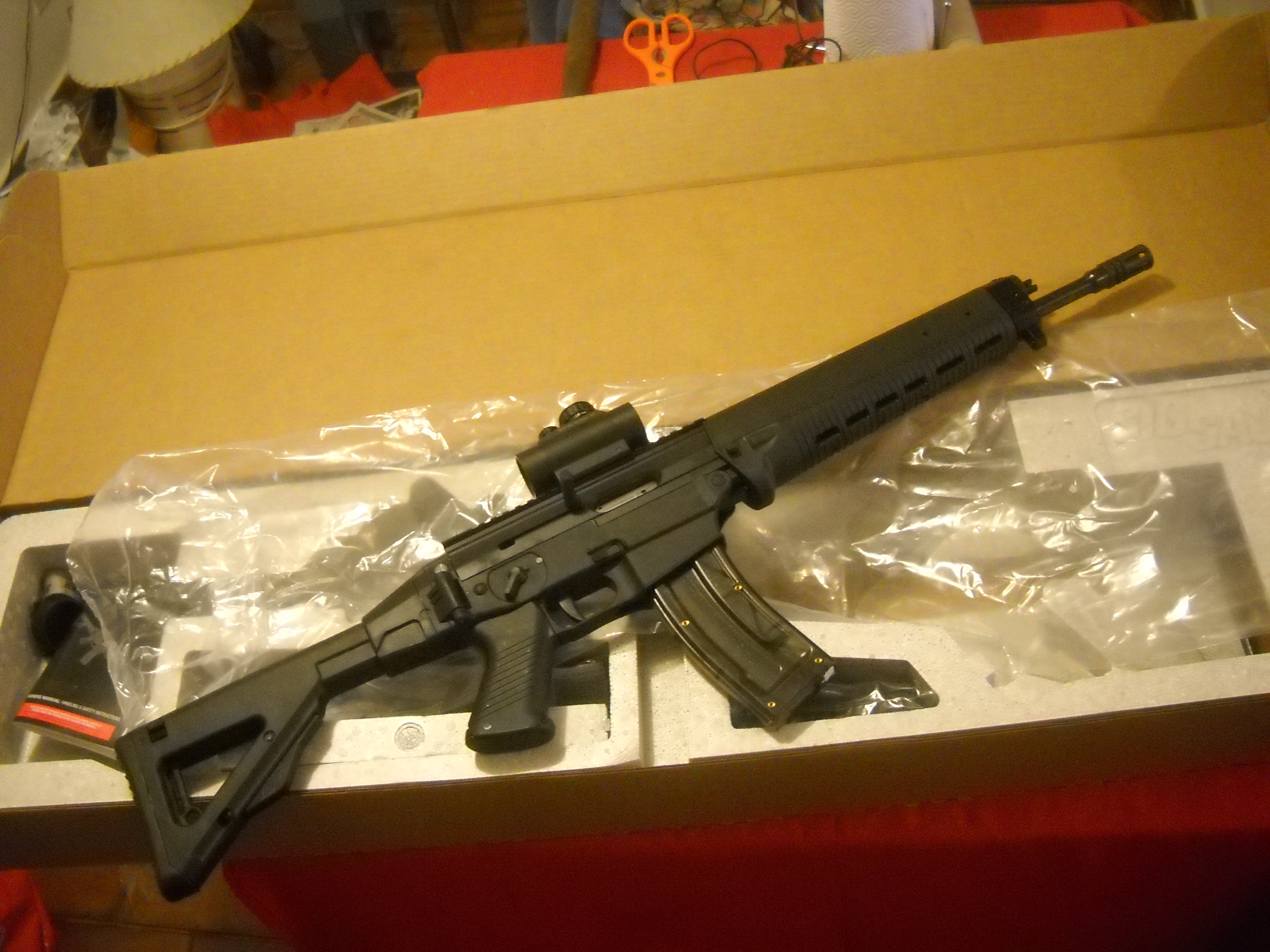
SIG 522LR

A cadet rifle is a rifle used by military cadets and others for basic firearms and marksmanship training. Generally .22 caliber and bolt-action, they also come in semi-automatic versions. They are often miniature .22 caliber versions of standard issue service rifles.

Older 19th century cadet rifles were simply smaller and lighter versions of standard issue service rifles designed to fire reduced power cartridges.

== Examples ==
- The Martini Cadet is a centerfire single-shot rifle produced in the United Kingdom by BSA and W.W. Greener for the use of Australian military Cadets. Although considered a miniature version of the Martini–Henry, it is internally different. Chambered for the .310 Cadet cartridge (aka: .310 Greener), it was used from 1891 to 1955.
- The Schmidt-Rubin Model 1897 cadet rifle was intended as a replacement for the earlier Vetterli rifles. The Model 97 rifles were single-shot using the bolt mechanism of the Schmidt-Rubin Model 89/96 rifle. It was to use a reduced power 7.5×55mm Swiss cartridge for the smaller younger cadets. The rifles sights were graduated both for the light and the standard loads. There were approximately 7900 of the cadet rifles made.
- The Springfield Model 1922 is a .22 caliber bolt-action rifle. It features a 24-inch (61 cm) barrel and a 5-round magazine. It was built as a cadet rifle, designed to mimic the M1903 Springfield rifle for training purposes. It was produced in several different versions until World War II, when shortages of materials made production of a training rifle impractical.
- The No.8 cadet rifle is a bolt-action .22 caliber version of the Lee–Enfield designed for British Army target shooting. They are simple single-shot, hand-fed cadet rifles and were originally designed to be used by military marksmen firing in civilian competitions, before being turned over to the cadet forces. The Number 8 was previously used by used by the British cadet services as a basic target rifle. Some examples are in civilian ownership worldwide, especially following the disposal by the New Zealand cadet forces of their Number 8 and Number 9 rifles at auction.
- The TOZ-8 is a single-shot, .22 caliber cadet rifle conceived in 1932 by the designer-gunsmith D. M. Kochetov and serially produced at the Tula Arms Plant. The TOZ-8 is a simple device, trouble-free and reliable in operation. It was widely used as the primary cadet rifle for military, paramilitary and police organizations in the USSR for decades. It is also used today for hunting small game.
- The Mauser KKW cadet rifle is a single-shot, .22 caliber rifle that was introduced in 1938. It is virtually identical to the Karabiner 98k. These cadet rifles were used by all German military, paramilitary and police organizations, especially the Hitler Youth.
- The CZ 452 (aka: the Trainer, Special or Special Military Training Rifle) is a .22 caliber, magazine-fed bolt-action rifle, equipped with a 24.8" (630 mm) barrel that is provisioned with tangent sights. The barrel is polished whereas the receiver has a matte finish; both are blued. The barreled action sits in a beech stock in the European-style with checkered grip, schnabel fore-end, and arched (curved) comb sometimes referred to as a Bavarian or "hogback" stock, and is trimmed with European sling swivels and a hard plastic butt plate. The lower drop at the heel and arched comb of the stock are designed to aid shooting with iron sights. The rear tangent sight is graduated in 25 meter increments with calibrated markings from 25 to 200 meters, while the sight leaf is adjustable for windage. The hooded front sight blade is adjustable for elevation.
- The TOZ-17 is a Soviet .22 Long Rifle, bolt-action cadet rifle with 5 round detachable magazine made by the TOZ firearms company. It has a similar appearance and functions much the same as the Mosin–Nagant rifle. The design reflects Soviet tradition, as it is very simple to use yet strong and functional. The rifle is very well built, reliable and accurate. It features twin extractors on the bolt which makes case ejection very positive. The bolt is considered large compared with most rimfire designs, paired with a large firing pin and spring assembly. The TOZ-17 has a free-floating barrel for increased accuracy.
- The Parker Hale L81A2, officially known as the L81A2 Cadet Target Rifle (CTR), is a 7.62×51mm, heavy-barrel, bolt action, hand-fed, single-shot rifle. It replaced the L81A1 and is used by the ATC, ACF, SCC and CCF in competitions such as The Schools Meeting, The Ashburton staged annually in July by the Council for Cadet Rifle Shooting (CCRS), and the Inter Service Cadet Rifle Meeting (ISCRM) held at Bisley Ranges.
- The C12A1 cadet target rifle is a 7.62×51mm, heavy-barrel, bolt-action, hand-fed, single-shot rifle with a free-floating barrel. It is a competition rifle used by members of the Royal Canadian Army Cadets for advanced training and target shooting competition.
- The WASR-22 or AK-22 Trainer is a .22 Long Rifle, semi-automatic cadet rifle loosely based upon the AK-47 and manufactured in Romania by Cugir Arms Factory. Unlike the AK-47, it uses a simple blowback method of operation. As such, it has no gas system and the internal components have been modified accordingly. While designed to be a cadet rifle for basic firearms and marksmanship training for the Romanian Army, it was never used as such. Instead, it was sold on the civilian market, primarily in the United States in collaboration with Century International Arms. Because of its cheap ammo and low recoil, it is marketed as a "starter" or "trainer AK". It is usually shipped with two 10-round magazines and is currently sold with the price ranging from $200 to US$500.
- The L98A1 Cadet GP Rifle was a 5.56×45mm NATO cadet rifle used by the Combined Cadet Force and Sea, Royal Marine, Army Cadet Force and Royal Air Force Air Cadets in the United Kingdom. It was introduced in 1987 to replace the .303 Lee–Enfield No 4 rifles and .303 Bren guns used for weapons training. The L98A1 rifle began a phased decommission in early 2009 and is now no longer in use. UK cadet forces have now received the updated L98A2 rifles. The L98A1 was similar to the L85A1, but lacked the gas components. It was a manually operated, single-shot rifle, with a cocking handle extension piece mounted on the right side of the weapon, and was cocked with the right hand. It was also fitted with adjustable iron sights. The L98A2 has the same gas parts and cocking handle of the L85A2, but lacks the selective fire switch. This means the L98A2 can only be operated in the semi-automatic mode but is the same in all other ways.
- The Smith & Wesson M&P15-22 is a .22 Long Rifle variant of the Smith & Wesson M&P15. It is blowback-operated, rather than direct impingement-operated. It is made with a polymer upper and lower receiver, rather than the aluminum that is normally used in M16 and AR-15 style rifle. It also uses proprietary polymer 10- and 25-round magazines. It was designed to be a less expensive alternative for training with an AR-15, as the rifle itself is much less expensive than most AR-15s, and the ammunition is also much less expensive than the .223 Remington/5.56×45mm NATO. The rifle features a safety, magazine release, operating handle and bolt lock that operate just like an AR-15's.
- The SIG 522LR is a .22 LR semi-automatic, blowback-operated rifle. It is patterned after the SIG 55x series rifles that fire 5.56x45mm centerfire cartridges. The 522 fires .22 LR ammunition and serves as a training rifle for its larger counterparts due to mostly identical controls and features. It differs from its centerfire counterpart in a number of ways. The 522 series has no adjustable gas block as the 55x series does. Instead, a mock gas block is installed. SIG refers to this as a storage container. Instead of 30-round magazines, the 522 series accepts 10-round or 25-round magazines that are manufactured by Black Dog Machine and re-branded for distribution with the SIG 522.

== Conversion kits ==
.22 caliber conversion kits are commonly used on standard M16 rifles and M4 carbines. As .22LR ammunition is cheaper and less powerful than the standard 5.56×45mm ammo, this allows for cheaper target practice on indoor pistol ranges.

== See also ==
- Drill purpose rifle
- Rubber duck (military)
