= WASR-series rifles =

Semi-automatic rifle

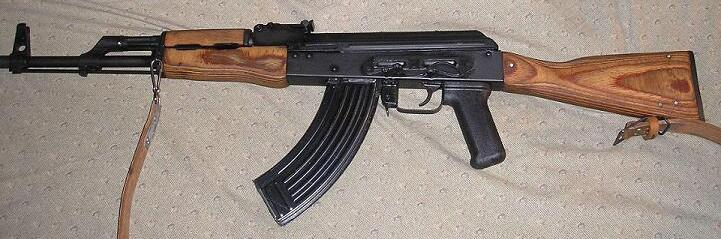
- GP WASR-10
- Type: Semi-automatic rifle
- Place of origin: Romania

Service history
- Wars: Mexican drug war

Production history
- Manufacturer: Cugir Arms Factory

Specifications
- Cartridge: WASR-2 5.45×39mm; WASR-3 5.56×45mm NATO; WASR-10 7.62×39mm
- Action: Gas-operated reloading
- Feed system: 30-round detachable box magazine
- Sights: Adjustable iron sights, optional mount required for optical sights.

Wassenaar Arrangement Semi-automatic Rifles (commonly referred to as WASR-series rifles) are a line of Romanian-designed gas-operated semi-automatic rifles sold in the United States by Century International Arms.

== Namesake ==
The WASR series takes its name from the 1996 Wassenaar Arrangement, a multilateral export control regime to monitor and limit the proliferation of certain conventional weapons and dual-use technologies.

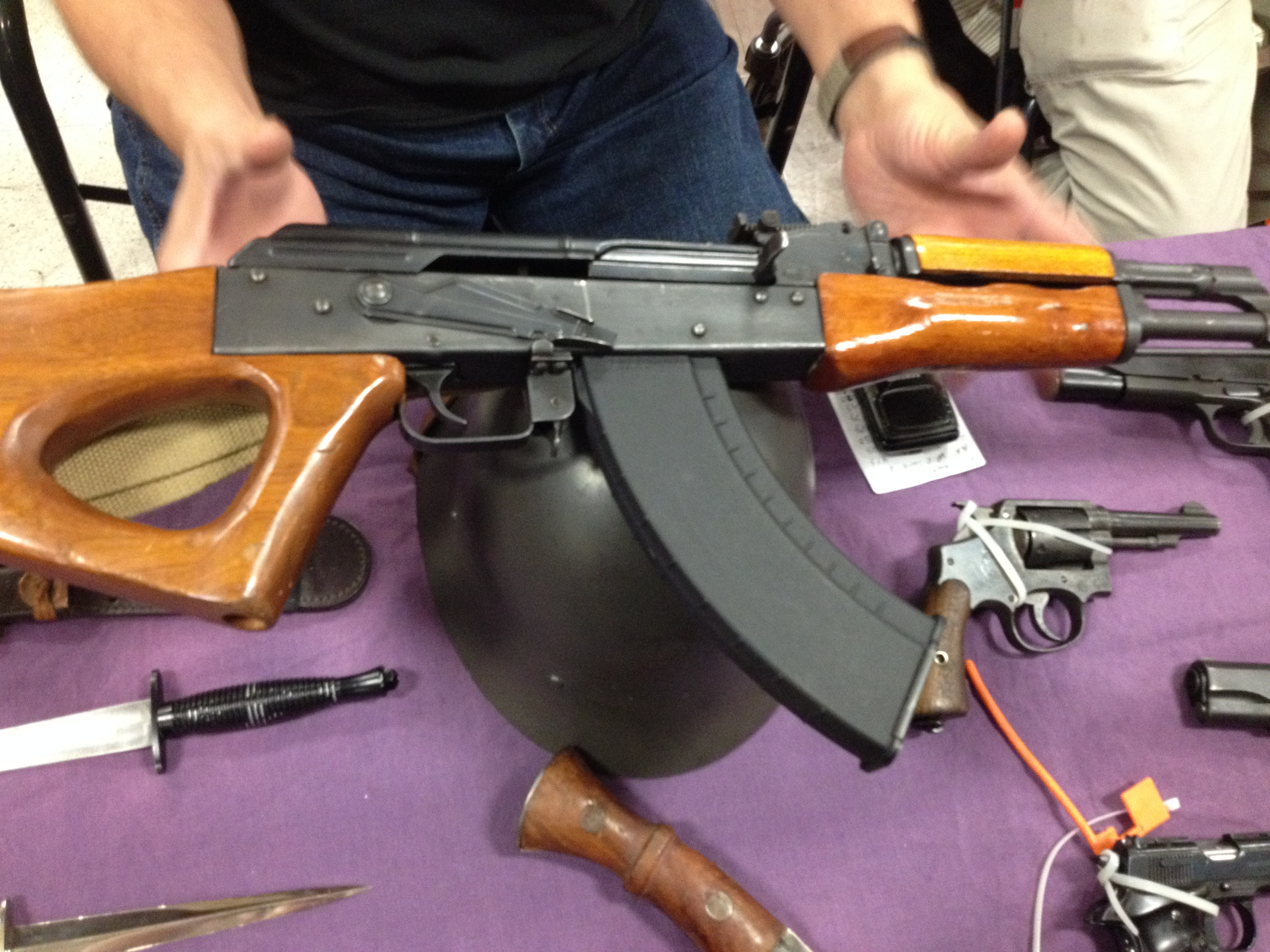
A sporterized WASR-10 with thumbhole stock displayed at a gunshow

== Design ==
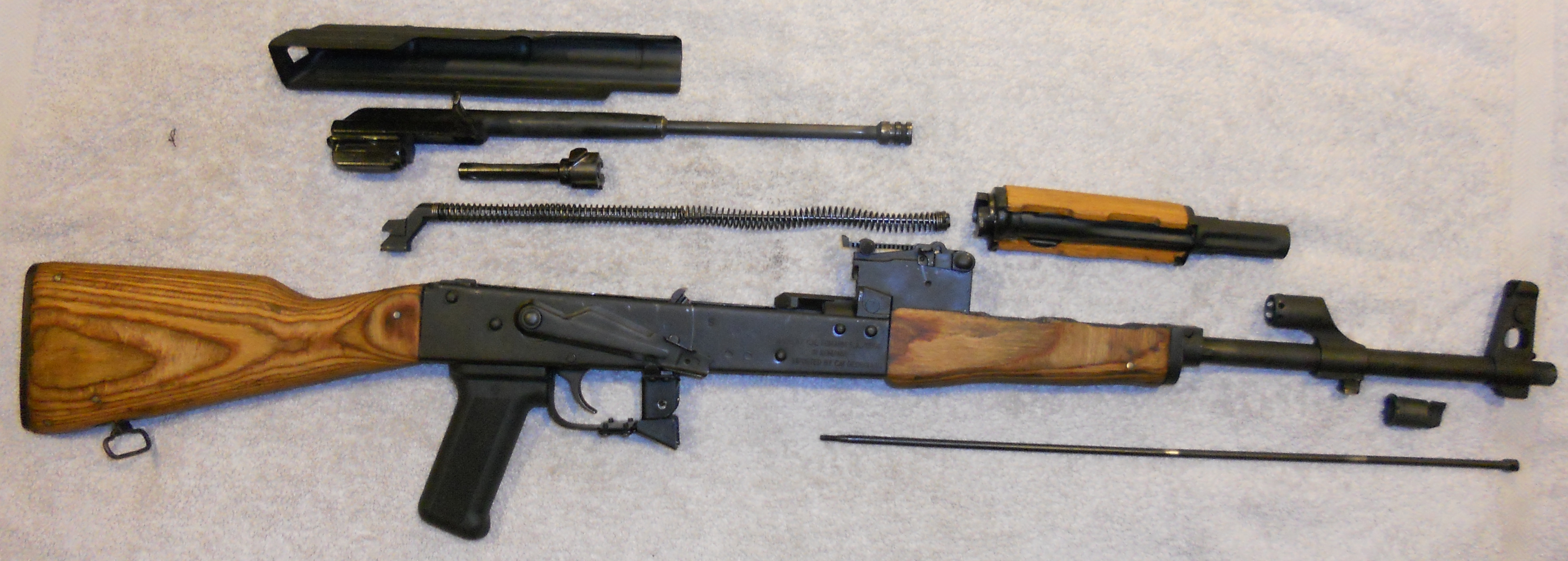
GP WASR-10 63 field stripped

The rifles are semi-automatic firearms manufactured in Romania by the Cugir Arms Factory and based on the Pistol Mitralieră model 1963/1965 (PM md. 63/65), which in turn was patterned directly after the Soviet AKM, itself a modernized derivative of the AK-47.

They differ from other AK pattern rifles in using internally welded spacer plates to center the magazine rather than dimples to strengthen the receiver above the magazine well. The arrangements of the rivets on the receiver and front and rear trunnions are distinctive amongst AK derivatives.

The rifles use stamped sheet metal receivers that were originally intended for single-stack magazines and feature hard chrome-lined barrels, side-mount scope rail and wooden stocks.

=== Trigger slap ===
Older WASR-series rifles commonly produced trigger slap, which is caused by the bolt slamming backward into the trigger assembly and causing significant pain to the shooter's trigger finger.

Beginning in 2007, Century International Arms has installed the TAPCO Intrafuse AK G2 trigger group, eliminating the painful trigger slap problem.

Rifles with this trigger group will have "TAPCO USA G2" stamped on the left side of the trigger. Some of these rifles may exhibit canted front sight blocks and gas tubes.

== Modifications for the United States ==
Once imported into the US, Century adapts the rifles to conform to national firearms regulations including Title 18, Chapter 44, of the United States Code.

The regulations prohibit fully-automatic fire and limit the number of major components that may originate from outside the U.S. Century Arms installs triggers, pistol grips, and stocks manufactured by TAPCO of Georgia.

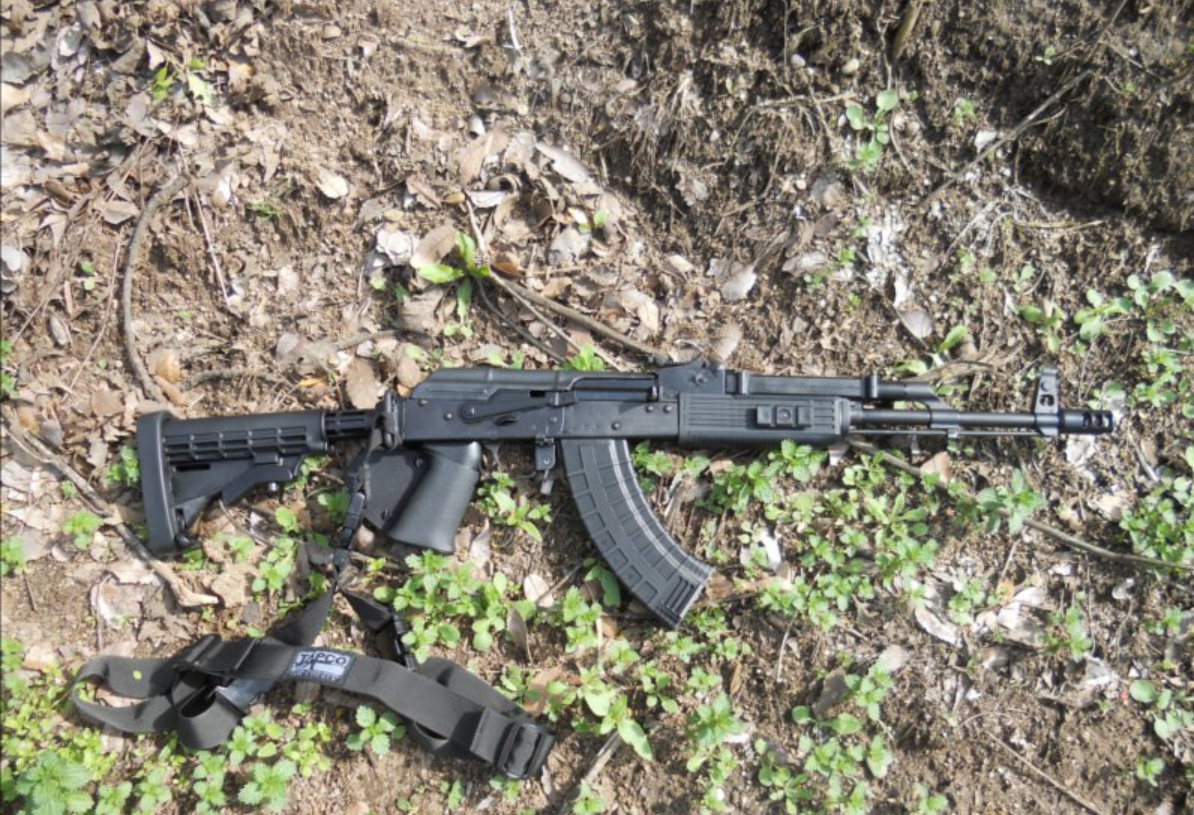
GP WASR-10/63 customized with aftermarket parts

== Variants ==
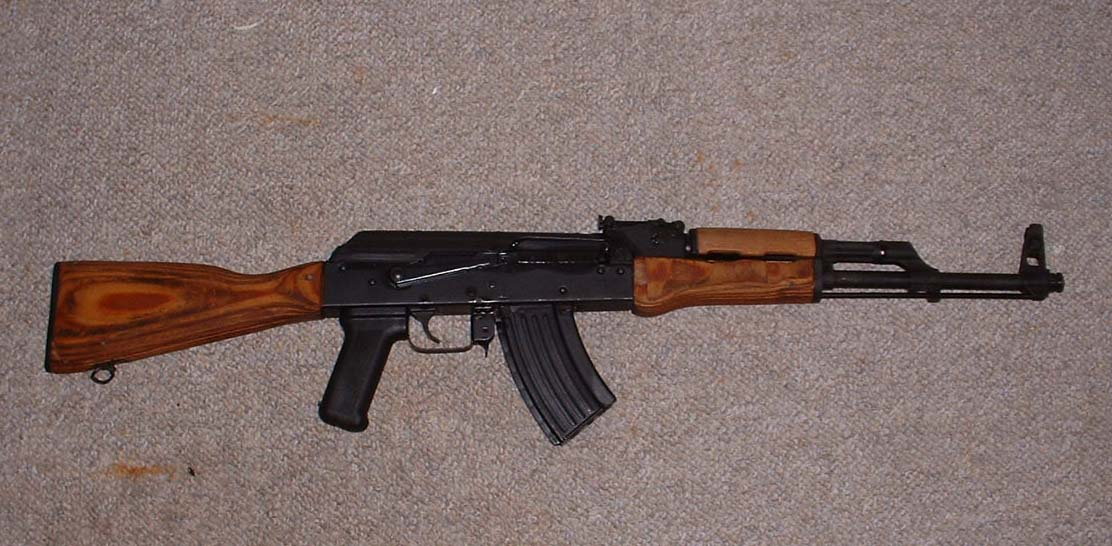
Century Arms WASR-10 with a "single stack" magazine

=== GP WASR-10 ===
The GP (General Purpose) WASR-10 is a 7.62×39mm caliber semi-automatic rifle that has been offered since the end of the Federal Assault Weapons Ban. Factory-original rifles only support single-stack, low-capacity magazines (10-rounds).

After import, Century Arms offered WASR rifles modified to accept double-stack, standard-capacity magazines. Pistol grip and thumbhole stocks were both commonly fitted to WASR rifles.

After the sunset of the 1994 assault weapons ban, importers are allowed to equip WASR-10s with compensators, bayonet lugs and folding stocks.

=== GP WASR-10/63 ===
The GP WASR-10/63 was built using the same newly-manufactured single-stack receiver and chrome-lined barrel as the GP WASR-10, and the two models are cosmetically similar. However, while the GP WASR-10 was made with new parts, all parts on the GP WASR-10/63 (other than the barrel) came from a former Romanian military rifle. The original year of manufacture can be seen engraved on the left side of the trunnion (the trunnion is visible where it protrudes through the receiver on the left side, near the front), along with the original rifle's serial number. Dates seem to range from the early 1960s to the 1980s. Most or all small metal parts are marked with the last few digits of the original serial number. As with other WASR models imported into the United States, Century Arms modified these rifles to accept normal 30-round magazines.

The pistol grip, trigger group, slant muzzle brake and gas piston were replaced with U.S.-made substitutes to comply with U.S. regulations.

=== WASR-22 ===
The WASR-22 or AK-22 Trainer is a .22 Long Rifle, semi-automatic cadet rifle loosely based upon the AK-47 and manufactured in Romania by Nova Modul Cugir Factory. Because of its cheap ammo and low recoil, it is marketed as a “starter” or “trainer AK”.

=== WASR-2 ===
The WASR-2 is a semi-automatic rifle version of the PA md. 86, which was developed from the AK-74.

Chambered in 5.45x39, the WASR-2 is visually similar to the WASR-10, but with the bayonet lug ground off and lack of a muzzle brake.

=== WASR-3 ===
This commercial export version of the WASR is chambered in 5.56×45mm NATO (which can also safely fire the .223 Remington round). It usually comes in the same configuration as the WASR-2.

These have known problems with jamming or failure to feed. This may be due to low quality magazines, or their followers.

The WASR-3 was originally supplied with surplus 5.45×39mm AK-74 magazines, which do not reliably feed the 5.56/.223 cartridge. People have used Wieger magazines with some success.

Century Arms eventually began including Romanian copies of the reliable Wieger magazine with these rifles. Some switch the follower of an AK-74 magazine with one from Robinson Arms.

Israeli Galil steel magazines are also known to work without modification in the WASR-3. Some owners have also modified the rifle to accept Bulgarian Circle-10 5.56 magazines, or Polish Beryl 5.56 magazines.

These sometimes require some material to be removed from the receiver center support bar.

=== WASR-M ===
The WASR-M is a 2020 variant pistol caliber carbine.

Utilizing a direct blowback mechanism, the WASR-M is chambered in 9mm Luger, and feeds from Glock pattern magazines.

== Notable incidents ==
WASR-10 rifles were used in the following mass shootings and other incidents in the US:

- Westroads Mall shooting
- 2009 shooting of Pittsburgh police officers
- 2011 White House shooting
- Murder of Andrew Oneschuk and Jeremy Himmelman
- Gilroy Garlic Festival shooting
- 2019 El Paso Walmart shooting

As of 2020, the WASR-10 is frequently used by various Mexican cartels in the country's drug war.

Between 2006 and 2011, the weapon was "the most common gun purchased in the United States ... to be traced to crimes in Mexico."

== See also ==
- Draco pistol
- Saiga semi-automatic rifle
- Zastava PAP series
