= Silver Bear (disambiguation) =

Silver Bear(s) may refer to:

- Silver Bear (Silberner Bär), a group of awards given in various categories at the Berlin International Film Festival
- Silver Bear ammunition, a brand of ammunition cartridges manufactured by Barnaul Cartridge Plant in Russia
- Silver Bears, a 1978 British comedy crime thriller film
