= Wolf Ammunition =

American ammunition brand

WOLF Performance Ammunition
- Industry: firearms
- Headquarters: Placentia, California, USA
- Area served: worldwide
- Website: wolfammo.com

WOLF Performance Ammunition is a trademark associated with Sporting Supplies International (SSI), a corporation founded in the United States in 2005. Most of their ammunition is primarily being manufactured by the Tula Cartridge Plant in Tula, Tula District, Russia, from 2005 to 2009. Some of their 22-caliber rimfire ammunition are also made by Eley Limited in England.

== Products ==
WOLF Performance Ammunition has several product lines which include:

- WOLF Polyformance – Polymer-coated steel-cased civilian-market hunting-cartridge ammunition from Russian factories. Which comes in a black box.
- WPA (WOLF Performance Ammunition) Military Classic – Polymer-coated steel-cased military-cartridge ammunition from Russian factories. Comes in a tan box with a camouflage pattern.
- WOLF Gold – Brass-cased civilian-market ammunition. Formerly made by Prvi Partizan, it is now manufactured in Taiwan and comes in a white box.
- WOLF Rimfire – Relabeled Eley Limited mid-grade 22LR ammunition from England and comes in a black box.
- WOLF Shotshell – Shotgun ammunition with polymer-hulled shells.
  - 410 Bore and 28 Gauge (Crimson Hulls)
  - 20 Gauge (Yellow Hulls)
  - Target Sport (Blue Hulls) shells are for skeet and target shooting.
  - Dove and Quail (Red Hulls) and Heavy Dove and Quail (Red Hulls) shells are for hunting small game birds, with the Heavy Dove and Quail having a larger amount of birdshot.
  - Pheasant (Orange Hulls) shells are for hunting medium game birds.
  - Water Fowl (Black Hulls) steel shot shells are for hunting large game birds like ducks and geese.
  - Power (Opaque White Hulls) slug or buckshot shells are for deer and other large game animals.
- WOLF Performance Primers: WOLF makes its own primers for loading or reloading centerfire cartridges.
- WOLF Performance Gear & Apparel: WOLF sells its own brand of gun carrying cases and clothing.

WOLF uses manufactured rounds with non-corrosive Berdan- and Boxer-type primers.

Russia has been their largest source of 7.62×39mm ammunition, which is used by the Russian AK-47 and SKS family of rifles, as well as the Ruger Mini-30.

T91 uppers have also been exported to the United States through Wolf Ammunition|Wolf Performance Ammunition. When it was first released Wolf was reported to have sold more than a thousand uppers in one day.

== Current events ==
Since 2009, the Tula Cartridge Plant and Ulyanovsk Machinery Plant (owned by Tula Cartridge Works since 2005) no longer manufacture cartridges for Wolf due to legal disputes.

== See also ==
- 7.62×54mmR
- 6.5mm Grendel
- 9×18mm Makarov
- Red Army Standard Ammunition
- Barnaul Cartridge Plant
- Tula Arms Plant
