= Draco Pistol =

Romanian semi-automatic pistol

Draco
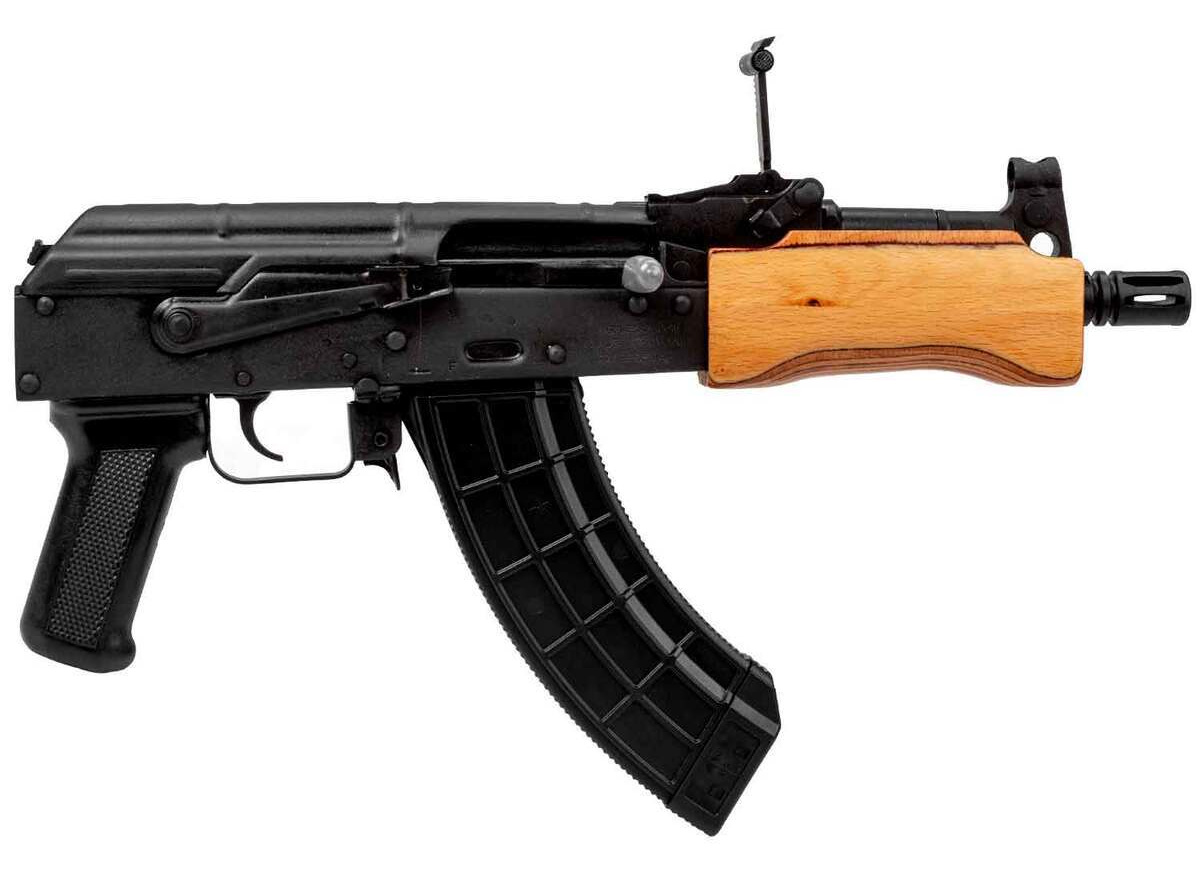
- A mini Draco pistol
- Type: Semi-automatic pistol, Short-barreled rifle, Pistol-caliber carbine
- Place of origin: Romania / United States

Production history
- Designer: Cugir Arms Factory
- Manufacturer: Cugir Arms Factory, Century Arms

Specifications
- Cartridge: 7.62x39mm 9x19mm Parabellum
- Action: Gas-operated
- Feed system: 10-, 20-, 30- or 40- round standard AK rifle box magazines and 75-round RPK drum magazines 6-, 10-, 13-, 15-, 17-, 19-, 24-, 25-, 31-, 33-, or 40-round box magazines and 50- or 100-round drum magazines from a Glock
- Sights: Adjustable iron sights

The Draco is a series of Romanian-designed gas-operated semi-automatic pistols originally imported from Romania and now domestically produced in America by Century Arms.

== Origin ==
Most Draco models available are built in Romania by Cugir Arms Factory and imported to the United States. Century Arms produces its own US-built variant using fully American components. The gun was given its name, short for Dracula, because the factory where it was first manufactured was in Transylvania, Romania, the setting of Bram Stoker's vampire story.

== Design ==
The Draco is chambered for the 7.62×39mm cartridge with its design taken heavily after the short barreled version of PM md. 90. Although mechanically a rifle, its stockless configuration allows it to be legally sold as a pistol/handgun, while holding a magazine of 30 rounds chambered in an intermediate rifle cartridge. 9×19mm Parabellum variants are also available

The "micro," or "mini" Draco versions of the weapon, with only a 6" barrel have been noted by some for inaccuracy and an apparent lack of practical application, though this could be explained to some extent by potential operator error stemming from the recoil of a rifle round being fired through a pistol length barrel, generally without a stock.

== Variants ==
- Draco: original version with 12.25" barrel and standard AK sights
- VSKA Draco Pistol: US-made variant of the original.
- Mini Draco: 7.75" barrel, standard AK sights.
- Draco Tactical: 7.5" barrel, with linear compensator, Strike Industries Dual-Folding pistol brace, US Palm free-floating M-LOK handguard and rail system with Picatinny rail integrated rear sight. Also sold in a version with no brace included.
- Micro Draco: 6.25" barrel, non-standard sights (non-adjustable rear sight, and adjustable front sight post).
- Draco 9S: 9×19mm pistol-caliber carbine variant using Scorpion magazines, 11.14" barrel, blowback action, hinged dust cover and rail system
- Draco NAK9: 9×19mm pistol-caliber carbine variant using Glock magazines, 11.14" barrel, blowback action, hinged dust cover and rail system

== Presence in the United States ==
The Draco is referenced or shown in several American rap songs and music videos. The online firearm retailer Gunsamerica discovered a direct correlation between Draco sales and its appearance in American rap songs in 2016 and 2017.

The Draco has been criticized by Detroit law enforcement officials. Detroit police chief James White has stated that he considers the Draco pistol an "assault rifle" and that it should not be sold in the city. The Detroit Police seized around 50 Draco Pistols in 2021-2022.

== See also ==
- Arms trafficking
- Machine pistol
- WASR-series rifles
- Pistol Mitralieră model 1963/1965
