= Barnaul Machine Tool Building Plant =

Company based in Barnaul, Russia

JSC Barnaul Machine Tool Building Plant
- Барнаульский станкостроительный завод
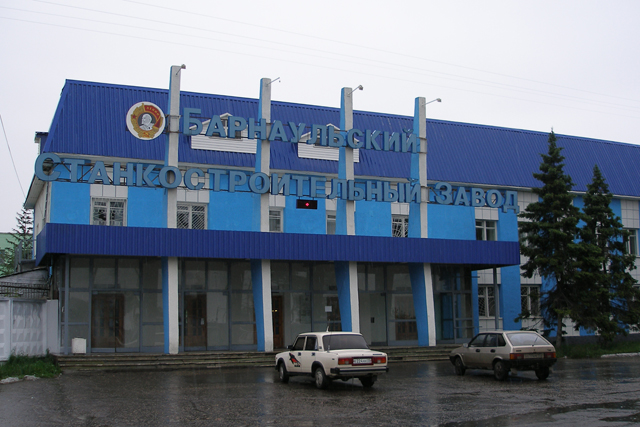
- 2007

General information
- Location: Russia, Barnaul

Website
- http://www.bszholding.ru/

JSC Barnaul Machine Tool Building Plant (Russian: Барнаульский станкостроительный завод) is a company based in Barnaul, Russia and established in 1941.

The Barnaul Plant was primarily a small arms ammunition producer. It now produces a wide range of civil products, and has invested in modern technological processes to expand its production.

In 2020, the Barnaul Machine Tool Building Plant increased its sales volume by 18.6% compared to the previous year. The total sales amounted to 5.0 billion rubles. Production volume grew by 14.5%.

In June 2022, it was reported that 509 employees at the Barnaul Machine Tool Building Plant were transferred to part-time work, and 199 employees received notices of impending layoffs.

== See also ==
- Barnaul Cartridge Plant
