= Red Army Standard Ammunition =

American ammunition manufacturer

- Company type: Private
- Industry: Firearms
- Founded: June 18, 2012; 13 years ago
- Headquarters: Delray Beach, Florida, U.S.
- Area served: United States
- Products: Ammunition Cartridges
- Services: Ammunition Supplier
- Parent: Century International Arms CenturyArms.com
- Website: RedArmyStandard.com

Red Army Standard Ammunition is a trademark associated with Century International Arms (CIA), an arms and ammunition corporation in Delray Beach, Florida, United States. The official spelling of the brand's name is faux Cyrillic, written as RЭD АRMY STAИDARD. The company supplies various sizes of cartridges for designs of firearms, such as the AKM and AK-47 rifles and the Makarov PM pistol, originating from Russia and former Soviet (Eastern Bloc) countries. Cartridges are made in various countries, including Russia, Ukraine, Romania, Bosnia and Herzegovina, and Poland. One manufacturer of RAS cartridges is Lugansk Cartridge Works, in Luhansk, Ukraine and its headstamp code is the letters "LU". Another factory is the IGMAN d.d. Konjic cartridge plant in the city of Konjic, in Igman, Bosnia and Herzegovina and its newer headstamp is the letters "IK", while the older headstamp consists of the Cyrillic letters "ИК".

== Ammunition products ==
- 7.62×25mm Tokarev 86-grain lead core, bi-metal copper-steel full metal jacket bullet, polymer coated steel case, non-corrosive, berdan primed
- 9×18mm Makarov 94 grain lead core, bi-metal copper-steel full metal jacket bullet, polymer coated steel case, non-corrosive, berdan primed
- 9×18mm Makarov ELITE 93 grain lead core, copper full metal jacket bullet with concave exposed lead base, brass case, non-corrosive, boxer primed
- 5.45×39mm lead core, bi-metal copper-steel full metal jacket bullet, polymer coated steel case, non-corrosive, berdan primed
- 7.62×39mm lead core, bi-metal copper-steel full metal jacket bullet, polymer coated steel case, non-corrosive, berdan primed
- 7.62×39mm HP lead core, bi-metal copper-steel hollow point bullet, polymer coated steel case, non-corrosive, berdan primed
- 7.62×39mm ELITE lead core, copper full metal jacket bullet, brass case, non-corrosive, boxer primed
- 7.62×54mmR lead core, bi-metal copper-steel full metal jacket bullet, polymer-coated steel case, non-corrosive, berdan primed. Note: Around summer 2013, some lots of this cartridge caliber from Romania contained corrosive components, thus the firearm needed to be thoroughly cleaned after each firing session.

== Technical details ==
Known ballistics of R.A.S. ammunition products are below. Some figures are calculated from inputs of other figures such as the energy measured in foot-pounds (ft-lbf). OAL stands for Overall Length.

Data for a Red Army Standard 9×18mm Makarov cartridge, labeled as 94 grain FMJ:

Head stamp	Cartridge case	Bullet (grains)	Bullet structure	Magnetic case	Magnetic bullet	OAL (inches)	Velocity (fps)	Velocity Average (fps)	Energy (ft-lbf)
Red Army LU 9×18mm Makarov	polymer coated steel, with red sealant	93.7-94.5	lead core bi-metal jacketed (copper clad steel), concave exposed lead base	Yes	Yes	0.972-0.980	1007-1070	1036	211-240

Data for a Red Army Standard 7.62×39mm cartridge with a steel case, labeled as 123 grain FMJ:

Head stamp	Cartridge case	Bullet (grains)	Bullet structure	Magnetic case	Magnetic bullet	OAL (inches)	Velocity (fps)	Velocity Average (fps)	Energy (ft-lbf)
7.62×39 LU Red Army Standard	lacquer coated steel, with green sealant	123	lead core bi-metal jacketed, copper clad steel	Yes	Yes	1.674	2311-2316	2309	1456

Data for a Red Army Standard 7.62×39mm ELITE cartridge with a brass case and copper-lead bullet, labeled as 123 grain FMJ ELITE:

Head stamp	Cartridge case	Bullet (grains)	Bullet structure	Magnetic case	Magnetic bullet	OAL (inches)	Velocity (fps)	Velocity Average (fps)	Energy (ft-lbf)
7.62×39 IK Red Army Standard	brass, with red sealant	123	lead core, copper jacketed	No	No	Unknown	2260-2324	2287	1428

Data for a Red Army Standard 5.45×39mm cartridge with a steel case, labeled as 69 grain FMJ:

Head stamp	Cartridge case	Bullet (grains)	Bullet structure	Magnetic case	Magnetic bullet	OAL (inches)	Velocity (fps)	Velocity Average (fps)	Energy (ft-lbf)
5.45×39 LU Red Army Standard	polymer coated steel, with green sealant	69	lead core bi-metal jacketed, copper clad steel	Yes	Yes	unknown	2655-2689	2664	1087

Data for a Red Army Standard 7.62×25mm Tokarev cartridge with a steel case, labeled as 86 grain FMJ:

Head stamp	Cartridge case	Bullet (grains)	Bullet structure	Magnetic case	Magnetic Bullet	OAL (inches)	Velocity (fps)	Velocity Average (fps)	Energy (ft-lbf)
7.62×25 14S RAS	lacquer coated steel, with red sealant	86	lead core, bi-metal jacketed, copper clad steel	Yes	Yes	1.37	1,590	1279-1329	483

== See also ==
- 9×18mm Makarov
- Wolf Ammunition
- Barnaul Ammunition
- Ballistics
- Tula Arms Plant
- Mesko, Arms plant in Poland
- List of military headstamps
- List of modern armament manufacturers
