= Springfield Model 1922 =

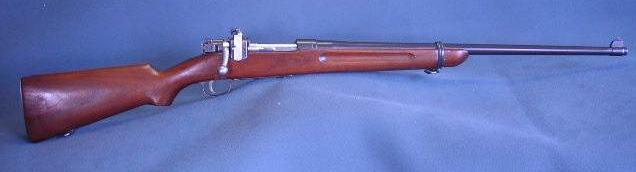
- Type: Cadet rifle

Production history
- Variants: M1922; M1922M1; M1922M1 NRA; M2

Specifications
- Barrel length: 24 inch
- Cartridge: .22 Long Rifle
- Action: Bolt action
- Feed system: 5-round magazine

The Springfield Model 1922 is a .22 Long Rifle bolt-action rifle introduced in 1922. It features a 24-inch (61 cm) barrel and a 5-round magazine. It was built as a cadet rifle, designed to mimic the M1903 Springfield rifle for training purposes. It was produced in several different versions until World War II, when shortages of materials made production of a training rifle impractical.

The M1922 variant was produced from 1922-1924. Total production of this model was 2,020 rifles. The M1922 featured a forked firing pin that contacted the cartridge at the 12 o'clock and 6 o'clock positions. This model was equipped with a distinctive protruding 5 round magazine unlike the other models which had flush fitting magazines. M1922 rifles were equipped with "NRA style" stocks with a cupped steel butt plate.

The M1922M1 variant was introduced in 1925. This version had a new bolt head, an improved firing mechanism, modifications to the chambering, and a new rear sight. The stock was also modified to incorporate a flat based pistol grip.

The M1922M1 NRA variant was introduced in 1927. This rifle basically consisted of the improved M1 version's action in the original 1922 version stock. This version was made for civilian use only and was not purchased by the U.S. Military.

The M2 variant was introduced in 1933. This version featured a simplified bolt and a shallower pistol grip on the stock. "M1922" was not included in the M2's designation.

All versions of the M1922 used what would be the safety lug on the 1903 bolt as the locking lug. Initial problems with this lug cracking drove further development of the M1922 resulting in the final M2 version. the main distinguishing change in the M2 variant was the incorporation of an adjustable headspace mechanism in the locking lug. This mechanism consisted of an Allen key screw that passed through the locking lug bearing against the right rear receiver wall. This headspace screw was locked in place, after adjustment, by a brass pin that bore against headspace screws' threads. the brass pin was not threaded but held in place by a lead plug. The lead plug shows a small eagle that was pressed into the plug by the special tool used by the armourer. If the eagle was disturbed the armourer would know that an attempt had been made to change the headspace by unauthorised personnel.

== See also ==
- Springfield Rifle
