= TOZ rifle =

TOZ rifles are a family of .22 Long Rifle bolt-action cadet rifles manufactured by the Tula Arms Plant (Russian abbreviation TOZ stands for Tulsky Oruzheyny Zavod). Most notably the TOZ-8, TOZ-17 and TOZ-78 which were used to train generations of Russian military, paramilitary and police cadets.

== TOZ-8 ==
TOZ-8
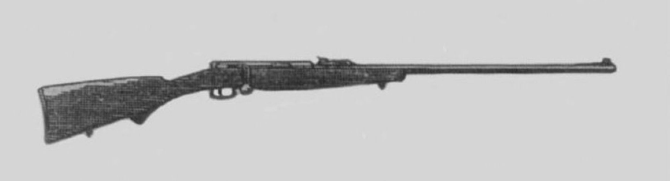
- Type: Cadet rifle

Production history
- Designer: D. M. Kochetov
- Designed: 1932
- Manufacturer: Tula Arms Plant; RPC Fort
- Produced: 1932 to late 1950s
- No. built: about 1 million
- Variants: TOZ-8M; TOZ-8OPF; TOZ-9; TOZ-11; TOZ-12; TOZ-12OPF; TOZ-16

Specifications
- Mass: 7.16 lb (3.25 kg)
- Length: 44 in (1,118 mm)
- Barrel length: 25 in (635 mm)
- Cartridge: .22LR
- Action: Bolt action
- Feed system: Single-shot
- Sights: Fixed sights with a graduated scale up to 250 M

The TOZ-1 is a single-shot .22LR, bolt-action cadet rifle designed in 1927 by V. G. Selivanov and Ya. I. Kanevsky. The TOZ-1s were made from the late 1920s to early 1930s, until it was replaced with the improved TOZ-8 rifles.

The TOZ-8 is a single shot .22LR bolt-action cadet rifle conceived in 1932 by the designer-gunsmith D. M. Kochetov and serially produced at the Tula Arms Plant. The TOZ-8 is a simple device, trouble-free and reliable in operation. It was widely used for marksmanship training in primary schools, gunsmith and DOSAAF paramilitary organizations in the USSR for decades. About one million TOZ-8s were made from the early 1930s to the late 1950s. Many TOZ-8 rifles are currently in civilian circulation and it is still used for hunting small game.

The receiver contains the bolt and trigger mechanism. The rifle uses a bolt action mechanism: a rotating bolt locks the cartridge in the chamber, closes the bore and ignites the cartridge, the user then works the bolt and ejects the spent cartridge. Lugs are missing; locking is performed on the charging handle. When the trigger is pressed, the striker is released and hits the primer. The trigger is affixed to the rear end of the trigger springs from below. When pressing the trigger rests its ledges in the receiver and move down the release spring high neck than releases the trigger, which, along with hammer, moves forward under the influence of spring and drives the firing pin into the primer, igniting the cartridge and firing the shot.

There is no magazine. In place of the magazine guide is a special guide that controls the motion of the cartridge when it is rammed into the chamber. Sights include front and rear open sights. A cover protects the operator from hot gas in the event of case failure during firing (see Firearm malfunction § Case head separation). The stock connects all parts of the rifle and serves for convenience when shooting; it has a butt, neck, and forearm.

=== Variants ===
- TOZ-8M – is a single-shot .22LR, bolt-action cadet rifle. It is an improved TOZ-8 that was developed after World War II.
- TOZ-8OPF – is a single-shot .22LR, bolt-action cadet rifle. It is the TOZ-8M produced by RPC Fort in Ukraine.
- TOZ-9 – is a single-shot .22LR, bolt-action rifle. It is the sporting version of the TOZ-8 designed by D. M. Kochetov.
- TOZ-11 – is a single-shot .22LR, bolt-action rifle. It is a lightweight version of the TOZ-9 made for hunters and fishermen. It was designed in 1946, by K.I. Shihvatov. The TOZ-11 was an award-winning design, that was about 2 kg lighter than the TOZ-9. The TOZ-11 was produced from 1946 to 1957.
- TOZ-12 – is a single-shot .22LR, bolt-action cadet rifle. It is an improved TOZ-8M designed by D. M. Kochetov. It features an adjustable aperture sight.
- TOZ-12OPF – is a single-shot .22LR, bolt-action cadet rifle. It is the TOZ-12 produced by RPC Fort in Ukraine.
- TOZ-16 – is a single-shot .22 LR, bolt-action rifle. It is based on the TOZ-11, and was produced using more modern manufacturing techniques.

== TOZ-17 ==
TOZ-17
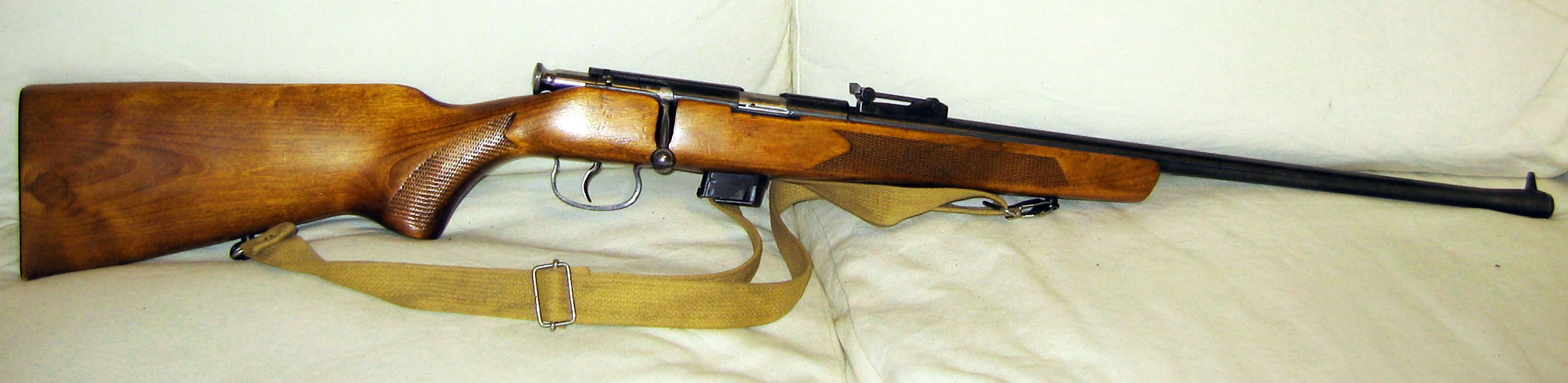
- Type: Cadet rifle
- Place of origin: Soviet Union

Production history
- Designed: 1956–1957
- Manufacturer: Tula Arms Plant
- Variants: TOZ-17; TOZ-17-01; TOZ-18; TOZ-78

Specifications
- Mass: 2.7 kg (6.0 lb)
- Length: 1,000 mm (39.4 in)
- Barrel length: 536 mm (21.1 in)
- Cartridge: .22 Long Rifle
- Feed system: 5 round detachable magazine
- Sights: Iron

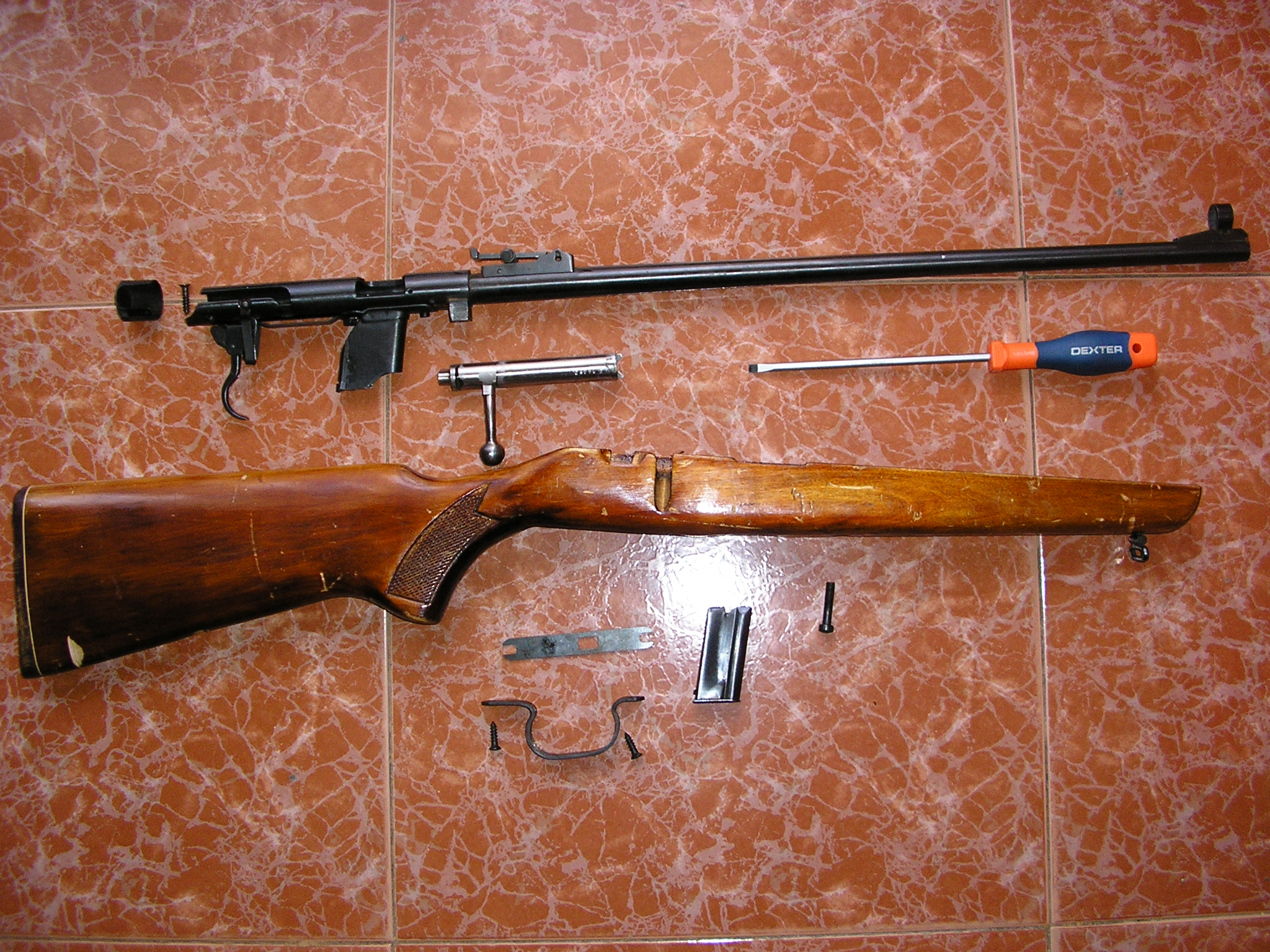
TOZ-17 disassembled

The TOZ-17 is a .22 LR, bolt-action repeating rifle with a 5-round detachable magazine. It was designed in 1956. It has a similar appearance, sights and functions as the Mosin–Nagant rifle. It intended for professional and amateur hunting and sport shooting.

The design reflects Soviet tradition, as it is very simple to use yet strong and functional. The rifle is very well built, reliable and accurate. It features twin extractors on the bolt which makes case ejection very positive. The bolt is considered large compared with most rimfire designs, paired with a large firing pin and spring assembly. The TOZ-17 has the bolt with a rear safety similar to BSA rifle as the BSA Sportsman.

The TOZ-17 has a free-floating barrel for increased accuracy. Its bore is anodized to reduce wear and increase barrel life. The TOZ-18 is the same rifle redesigned to accept a 2.5-power fixed focus scope. Its receiver has a standard dovetail rail for allowing a scope, but requires high rings to allow the scope to clear the rear sight.

== TOZ-78 ==
TOZ-78
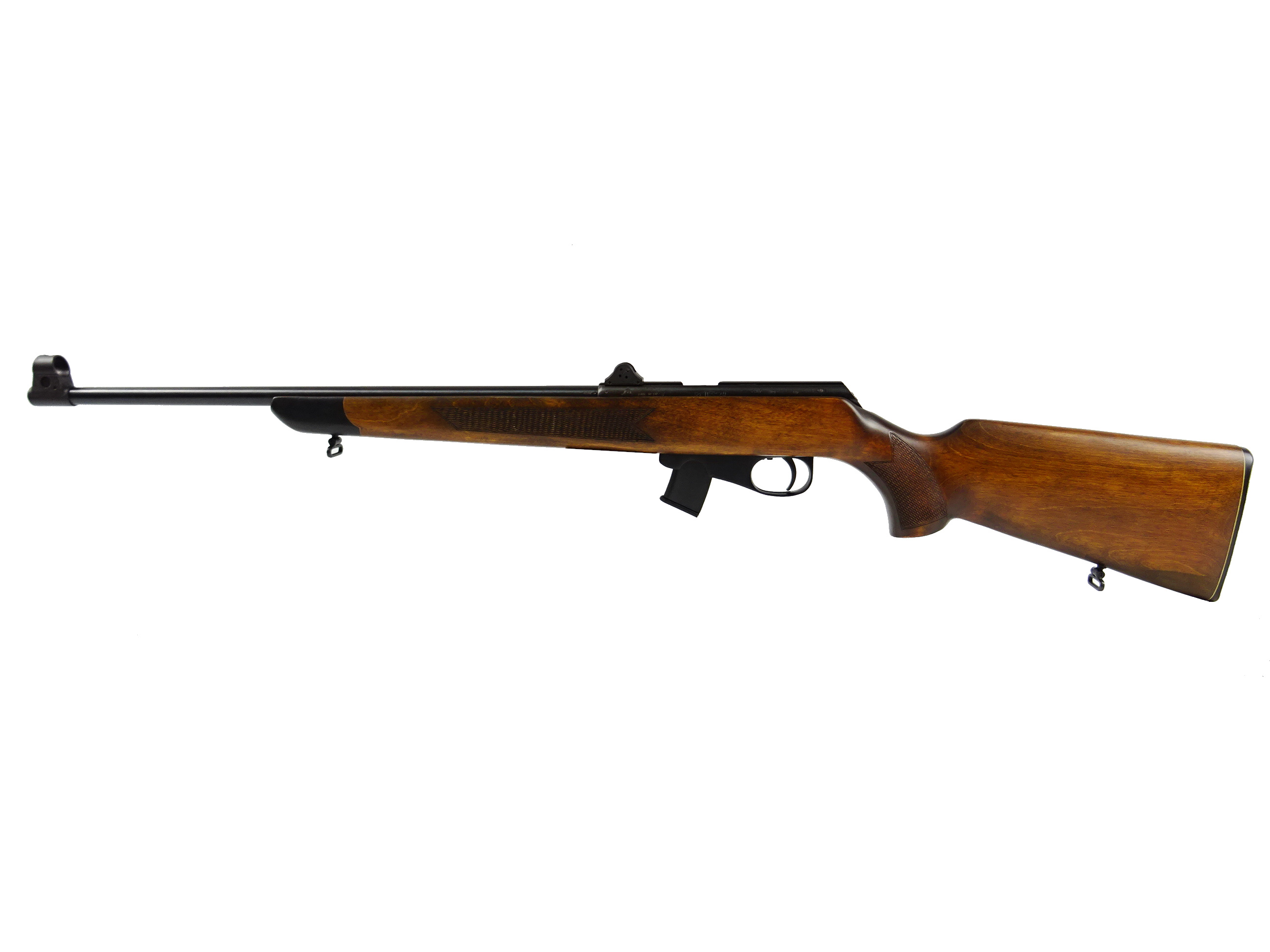
- Type: Cadet rifle
- Place of origin: Soviet Union

Production history
- Designed: 1986–1987
- Manufacturer: Tula Arms Plant
- Variants: TOZ-78; TOZ-78-01; TOZ-78-04; TOZ-78-05; TOZ-78-06

Specifications
- Mass: 2.7 kg (6.0 lb)
- Length: 1,000 mm (39.4 in)
- Barrel length: 536 mm (21.1 in)
- Cartridge: .22 Long Rifle
- Feed system: 5 or 10 round detachable magazines
- Sights: Iron sight 2.5-power fixed focus scope

The TOZ-78 is a .22 LR, bolt-action repeating rifle. It uses 5- and 10 round detachable magazines. The TOZ-78 was designed in 1986 and is still in production. It is based on the TOZ-17 and comes in various improved models. The TOZ-78-04 has a thread barrel to attach a suppressor. The TOZ-78-05 is a heavy barrel version designed to be used with a 2.5-power fixed focus scope. This model does not have iron sights. The TOZ-78-06 - heavy barrel version, with a thread barrel.

== See also ==
- KS-23
