= Pistol Mitralieră model 1963/1965 =

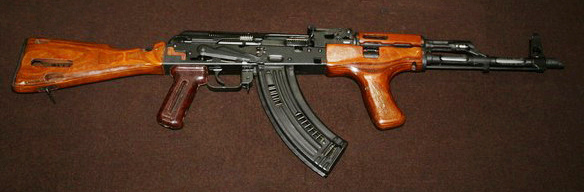
- Cutaway model of a PM md. 63
- Type: Assault rifle
- Place of origin: Socialist Republic of Romania

Service history
- In service: 1963–present
- Used by: See Users
- Wars: See Conflicts

Production history
- Designed: 1960–1963
- Produced: 1963–present
- Variants: See Variants

Specifications
- Mass: 3.1 kg (6.8 lb)
- Length: 750 mm (30 in) (fixed stock)
- Barrel length: 414 mm (16.3 in)
- Cartridge: 7.62×39mm
- Action: Gas-operated (rotating bolt)
- Rate of fire: 600 rounds/min
- Muzzle velocity: 670 m/s (2,200 ft/s)
- Effective firing range: 400 m (440 yd)
- Feed system: 30-round detachable magazines

The Pistol Mitralieră model 1963/1965 (abbreviated PM md. 63 or simply md. 63) also known as MD-63, is a Romanian 7.62×39mm assault rifle. Developed in the late 1950s, the PM md. 63 was a derivative of the Soviet AKM produced under license. It was the standard-issue infantry weapon of the Army of the Socialist Republic of Romania until the late 1980s, after which it was gradually superseded by the Pușcă Automată model 1986, a derivative of the Soviet AK-74.

Beginning in 1965, Romania also produced the Pistol Mitralieră model 1965 (abbreviated PM md. 65 or simply md. 65), which is an md. 63 with a folding stock.

== History ==
=== Development ===
During the late 1950s, the standard service rifle of the Romanian Army was the Soviet AK-47, as well as a variant of the same weapon with a folding stock, the AKS. Around the same period, however, the Soviet Union developed the AKM, an improved AK-47 design which utilized a stamped metal receiver and was cheaper to produce. With Soviet assistance, the Romanian government launched a program to manufacture a domestic AK rifle patterned directly after the AKM. The new weapon was to replace the AK-47 in Romanian service and was designated Pistol Mitralieră. The first production model appeared in 1963 and was designated Pistol Mitralieră model 1963 (PM md. 63). PM md. 63s produced for export were designated AIM md. 63. A semi-automatic variant of the PM md. 63 was produced solely for issue to the Patriotic Guards, a state militia; these were marked with a large "G" on either side of the trunnion. The PM md. 63 was initially indistinguishable from the Soviet AKM; however, during the mid-1960s a laminated wooden foregrip was added to the design. This was to allow Romanian riflemen to control the weapon's vertical muzzle climb during fully automatic fire. For the duration of its service life, the PM md. 63 and its derivatives were primarily produced at the Cugir Arms Factory in Alba County. Beginning in the 1970s, some production was also outsourced to Uzina Mecanică Sadu in Gorj County.

In 1965, a second production model appeared and was designated Pistol Mitralieră model 1965 (PM md. 65). This was to replace the AKS in Romanian service and featured a folding stock; it resembled a Soviet AKMS with an older AKS-pattern stock. PM md. 65s produced for export were designated AIMS md. 65. The PM md. 65 was initially produced with traditional AKM-pattern handguards due to the difficulty encountered in adding the PM md. 63's foregrip to the folding stock design; the stock was designed to fold flat against the base of the handguard. Adding a foregrip which pointed drastically rearwards was problematic because this would impede changing the magazine. Romanian engineers subsequently designed a shorter foregrip for the PM md. 65 with a slight rearward cant, allowing the folding stock to lock undearneath the handguard while also allowing enough space for a magazine to be removed or inserted.

The PM md. 65 initially required a separate production line from that of the PM md. 63, since the addition of a folding stock to the design necessitated a different receiver. In an attempt to streamline production, the Cugir Arms Factory subsequently replaced the traditional AKS under-folding stock with a side-folding stock copied directly from the East German MpiKMS, which was itself a licensed derivative of the AKMS. The side-folding MpiKMS stock could be fitted on AKM-pattern receivers designed for fixed stocks, making the receivers interchangeable. This modified PM md. 65 received the designation PM md. 90. The PM md. 90 was assembled with the same foregrip and handguards as the PM md. 63, since the side-folding stock meant that a different foregrip was no longer necessary.

=== Service ===
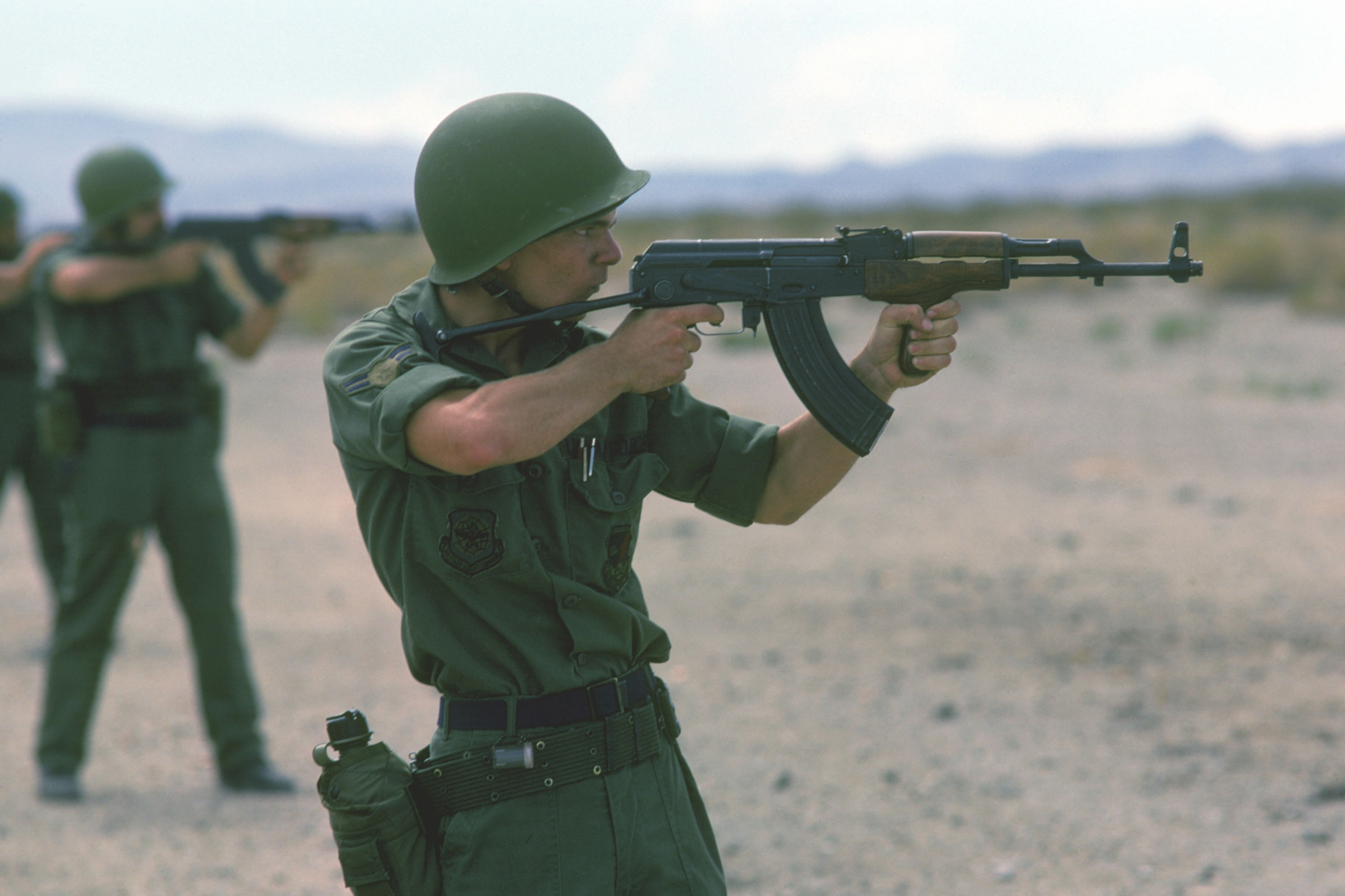
US Air Force personnel with AIM md. 65s during a training exercise in 1985.

In the early 1970s, Romania supplied AIM md. 63s as military aid to the People's Army of Vietnam. These weapons saw service during the final years of the Vietnam War.

During the 1980s, the United States Army acquired a number of AIM md. 63/65s from an unidentified nation which had received Romanian military aid; these were used to simulate AKMs by its opposing force (OPFOR) units during training exercises. The AIM md. 63s were also used by the United States Marine Corps for weapons familiarization courses during the Iraq War.

Over the course of the Iran–Iraq War, Romania exported AIM md. 63/65s to both Iraq and Iran.

During the Angolan Civil War, South Africa's apartheid government covertly armed the National Union for the Total Independence of Angola (UNITA) with AIM md. 63s. Although the country was then under an arms embargo as a result of United Nations Security Council Resolution 418, it was able to purchase the rifles through black market intermediaries in Europe. Kalashnikov-pattern arms like the AIM md. 63 were obtained to keep South Africa's involvement deniable, since they could be easily passed off as weapons captured from the Angolan armed forces by the UNITA rebels. AIM md. 65s were also used alongside Soviet AKM and AKMS rifles by uMkhonto weSizwe during its internal resistance campaign against apartheid.

The Provisional Irish Republican Army (IRA) used AIM md. 63s during the Troubles; these were apparently received as military aid from Libya. Due to the well-publicized appearance of AIM md. 63s and other Libyan-supplied Romanian weapons in the hands of the IRA, the US State Department warned Romania to cease arms exports to Libya or risk being classified as a state sponsor of terrorism. Following the official cessation of hostilities in Northern Ireland, the rifles continued to be used by republican dissidents in attacks such as the Massereene Barracks shooting.

In the late 1980s, Panama imported a number of AIM md. 63s to arm its paramilitary Dignity Battalions.

Vast numbers of surplus or redundant PM md. 63/65s were disposed of from Romanian military stocks following the Romanian Revolution and sold overseas, making the weapon type increasingly prolific around the world. In 1995, India purchased 100,000 of the rifles from Romania to arm its security forces, at a cost estimated to be $85 to $90 per weapon.

In October 2024, the PM md. 63 remained in limited Romanian service with reserve military units alongside the PA md. 86.

== Features ==
The PM md. 63 was almost indistinguishable from an early Soviet AKM with a stamped receiver. It was issued with an early pattern AKM bayonet, also manufactured under license from the Soviet Union. The Romanian PM md. 63 bayonets were indistinguishable from early Soviet AKM bayonets, bar the unique serial numbers with a Latin letter prefix etched on the crossguard and scabbard face. They were also fitted with wrist straps of brown leather with three-slot buckles for attachment to the crossguard and a friction buckle for attachment to the hilt. The bayonet was suspended by a bayonet frog, rather than the more common hangar strap favored by some Eastern European armies of the era, from a rifleman's equipment. The PM md. 63 was also issued with a unique Romanian leather sling, which was later replaced by nylon slings that more closely resembled the late Soviet pattern.

Early production PM md. 63/65s were not fitted with the same slanted muzzle brake as the Soviet AKM, but a simple muzzle nut which more closely resembled that of the original AK-47. Later PM md. 63s and PM md. 90s were fitted with the slanted muzzle brake.

Each PM md. 63/65's receiver was marked on the left with the year of production and a serial number with a Latin letter prefix. There are three fire selector markings on the right side of the receiver: "S" ("Sigur", safe), "FA" ("foc automat", automatic fire), and "FF" ("foc cu foc", semi-automatic fire). The same fire selector markings on the AIM and AIMS export variants were "S", "A", and "R".

== Variants ==
=== Patriotic Guards version ===
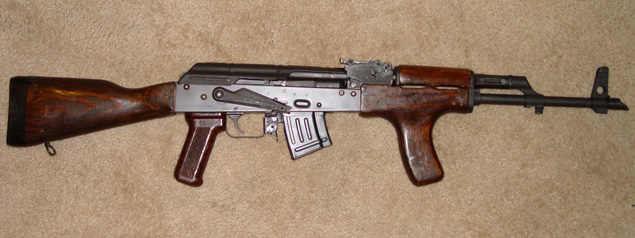
A reconstructed 'Gardă' PM md. 63, with a US-made receiver.

The most-produced civilian export variation of this rifle is that of the 'Gardă' designation, produced for the Romanian Patriotic Guards. These rifles have a letter 'G' engraved on the left side of the rear sight block. The civil guard versions are modified by the removal of the sear and the modification of the disconnector to be semi-automatic only. Tens of thousands of these have been imported into the United States and sold as 'parts kits' (the receiver is destroyed by torch-cutting per BATF regulations – without the receiver, the kit is no longer legally considered a firearm). They are colloquially known among firearms enthusiasts as "Romy G's".

=== PM md. 80 ===
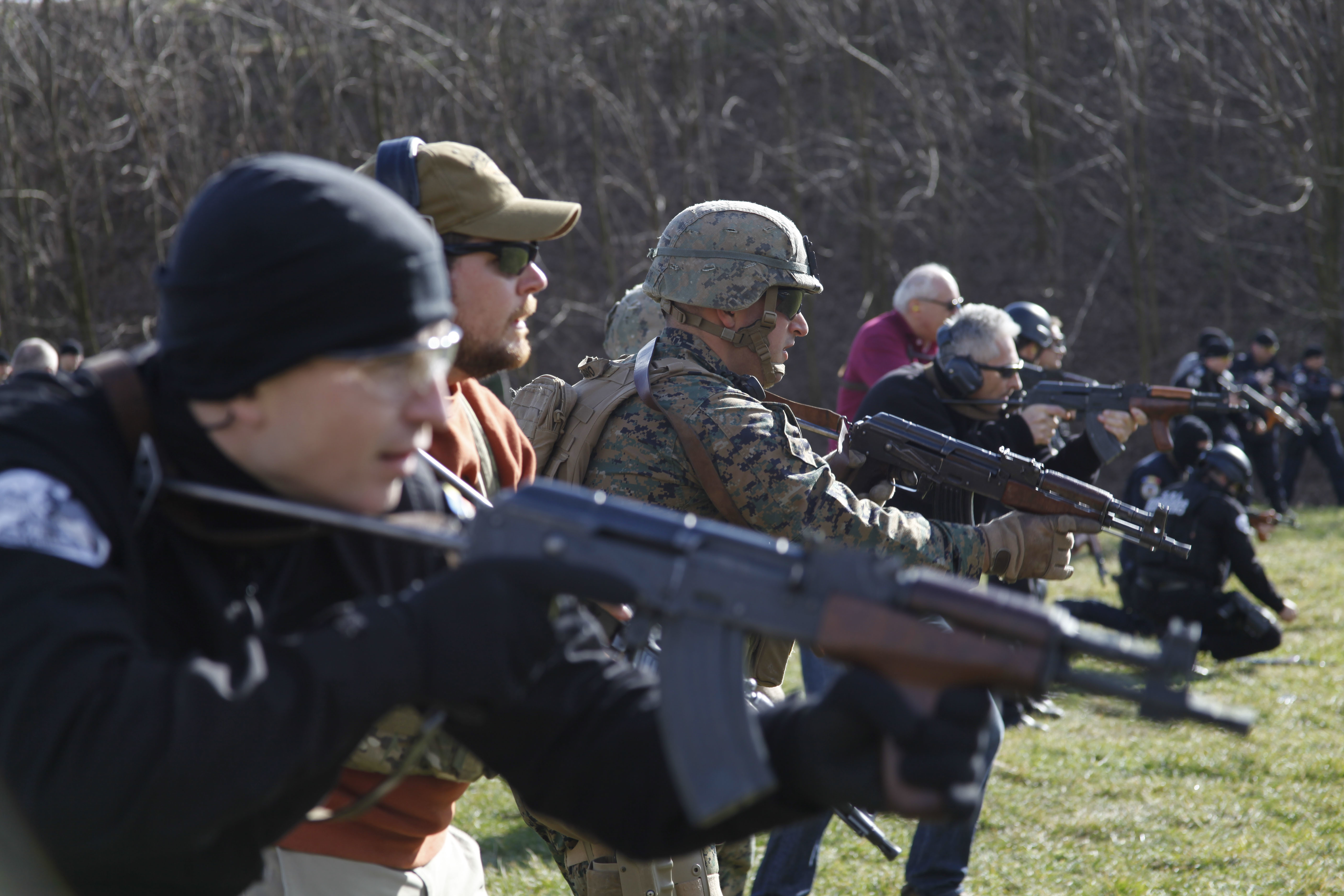
Romanian Brigada Antiteroristă police tactical unit officers with PM md. 80s during joint exercise with USMC Fleet Anti-terrorism Security Teams in 2015.

The Pistol Mitralieră model 1980 is a short barreled AK variant, and the first side-folding stock version produced in Romania. It featured a shorter gas block and usually used 20 round magazines. The front sight post is combined with the gas-block to provide an overall short length. The side folder is straight and folds to the left. There are two types of muzzle brakes used: a cylindrical one, and more commonly a slightly conical one. It is also known as the AIMR.

=== PM md. 90 ===
The Pistol Mitralieră model 1990 also known as the PM md 90 is the 7.62mm response to the 5.45mm Pușcă Automată model 1986. It is internally identical to a PM md. 63/65, and outwardly differs in that it has a wire folding stock identical to the PA md. 86 stock, and that all of the rifles are fitted with slant brakes. It began being used in 1990 and its still used to this day.

==== Short barrel version ====
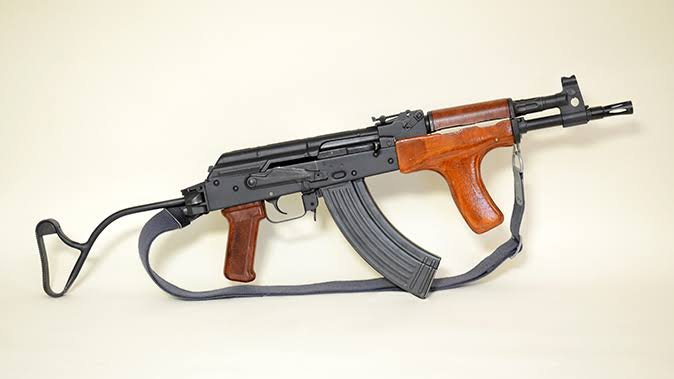
Short-barreled Pm md. 90

The carbine version of the model 90, called simply PM md. 90 cu țeavă scurtă (short-barreled PM md. 90), has a 305 mm (12 in) barrel, an overall length of 805 mm (31.69 in) or 605 mm (23.81 in) with the stock folded, and weighs 3.1 kg (6.83 lbs) empty. It was designed for tank crews and special forces. Apart from the stock and the shortened barrel, it features the same modifications as the PM md. 80.

=== 7.62mm RPK ===
The RPK version of the md. 63 is called the md. 64. It is essentially identical to the Soviet RPK.

=== Other civilian versions ===
Several semi-automatic variants of the PM md. 63 have been produced for commercial export to the United States, namely the WASR-series rifles imported by Century Arms. Other semi-automatic PM md. 63 derivatives sold commercially in the United States were designated SAR-1, ROMAK 1, ROMAK 991, and WUM-1. A variant of the PM md. 90 carbine is also available in the United States as the Draco.

In Germany there are civilian versions on the market under the name/model Cugir WS1-63 (fixed wood stock), WS1-64 (underfolder stock), WS1-64SB (Short Barrel 314mm with the underfolder stock).

The WS1-63HO is the straight-pull bolt action version. The rifle must be charged after every shot that is fired.

== Conflicts ==
- Vietnam War
- Karen conflict
- The Troubles
- Communist insurgency in Thailand
- Angolan Civil War
- Iran–Iraq War
- Romanian Revolution
- Gulf War
- Yugoslav Wars
- Nagorno-Karabakh conflict
- Dissident Irish republican campaign
- War in Afghanistan (2001–2021)
- Syrian civil war
- Mali War
- RENAMO insurgency (2013–2021)
- Yemeni civil war (2014–present)
- Islamic State insurgency in Iraq (2017–present)
- Russian invasion of Ukraine

== Operators ==
=== Current operators ===
- Azerbaijan
- Bangladesh
- Burundi
- Central African Republic
- Estonia
- Georgia
- India
- Iran
- Indonesia
- Iraq
- Israel: Captured from PLO.
- Libya
- Lord's Resistance Army
- Liberia
- Mali
- Morocco
- Mozambique
- Nicaragua
- Romania: Used by Navy personnel, border guards, tank crews, reserve troops.
- Saudi Arabia
- Sierra Leone
- South Sudan
- Uganda
- Ukraine
- United States: 100 AIMs used by US Army OPFOR in the 1980s.
- Vietnam

=== Former operators ===
- Islamic Republic of Afghanistan: 1,000 donated by Romania between 2002 and 2006.
- Chechen Republic of Ichkeria
- Croatia
- Panama
- Provisional Irish Republican Army
- RENAMO
- Umkhonto we Sizwe
- UNITA

== Gallery ==
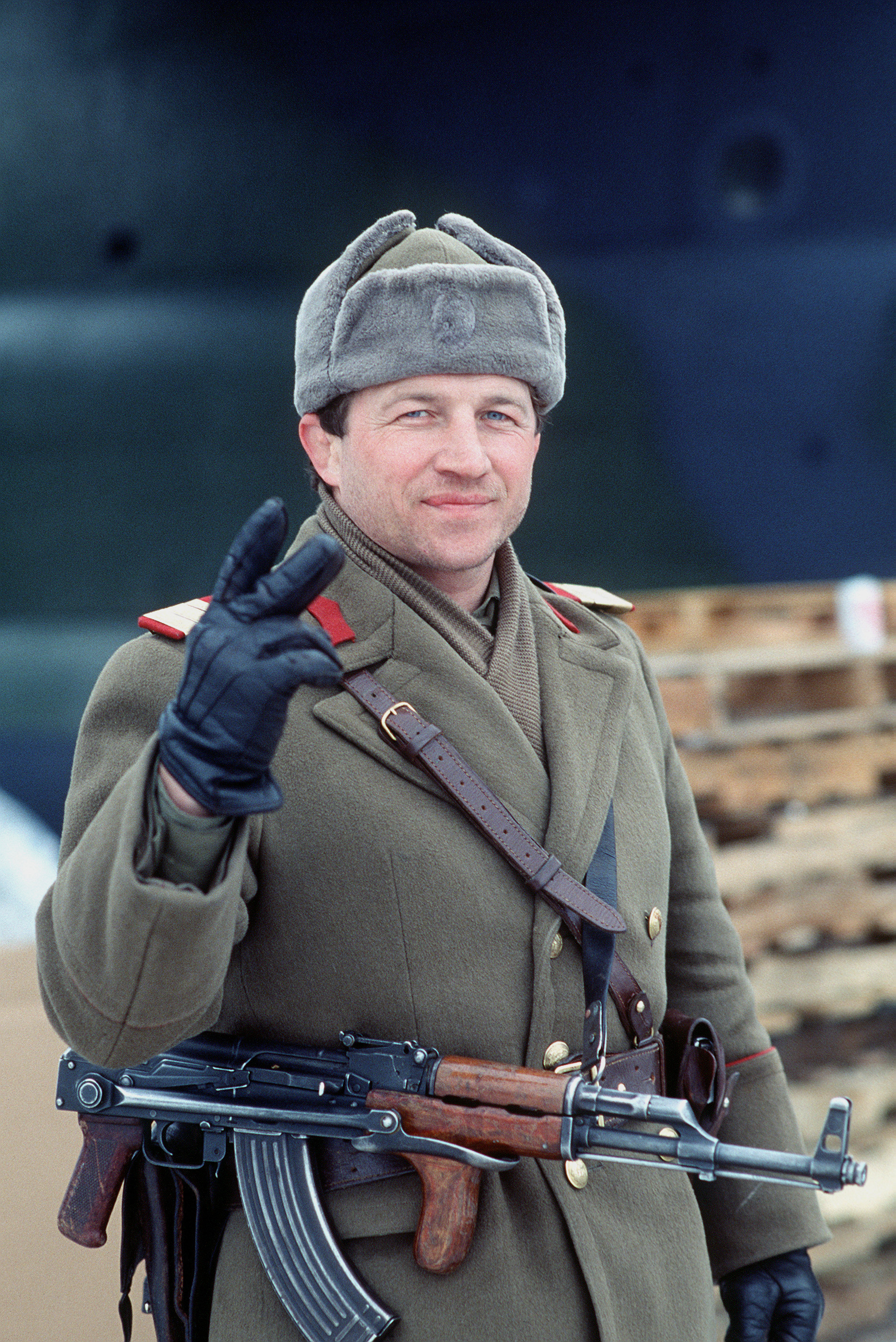
A Romanian soldier armed with a PM md. 65 in 1989.

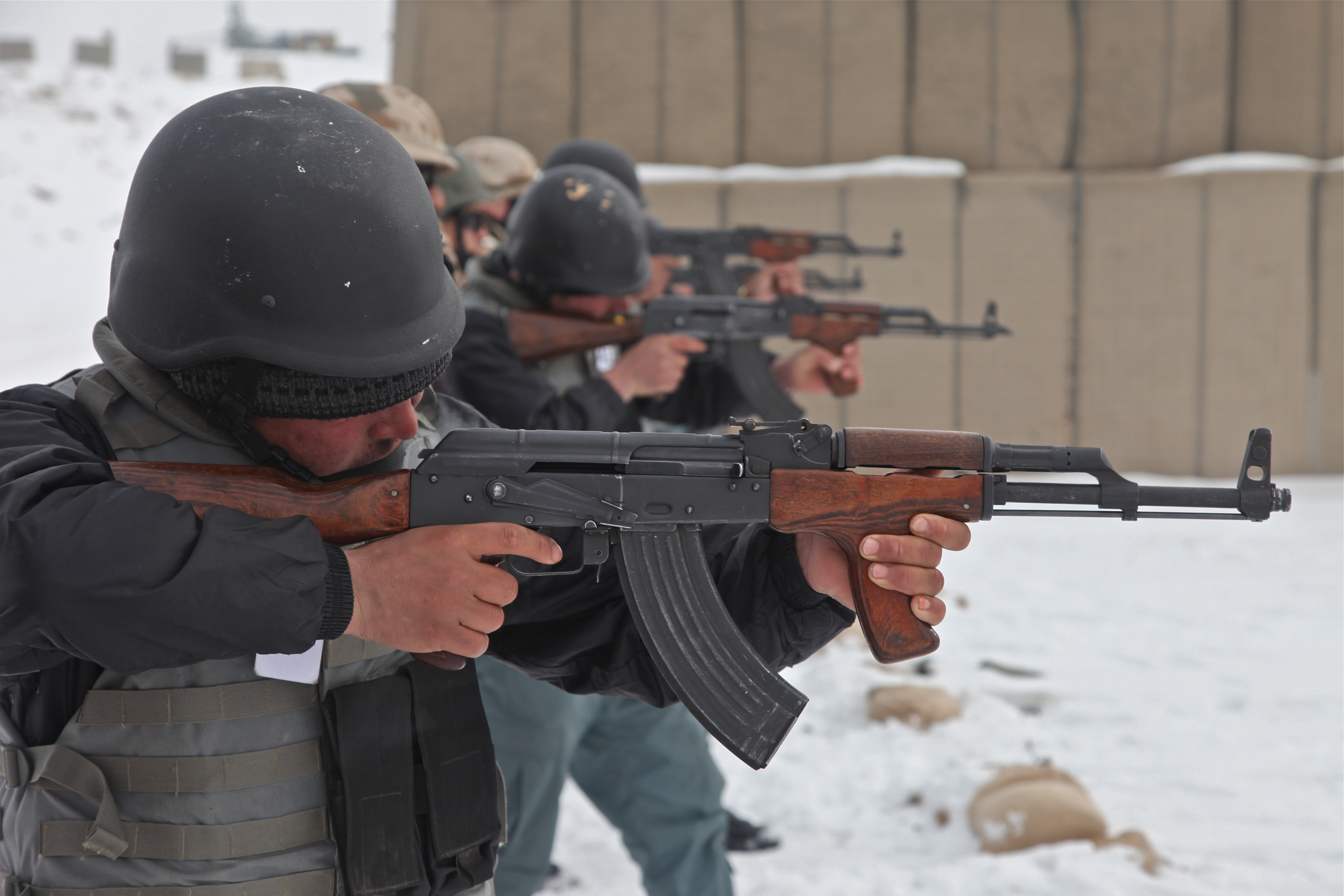
Afghan Police officers fire their PM md. 63 assault rifles.

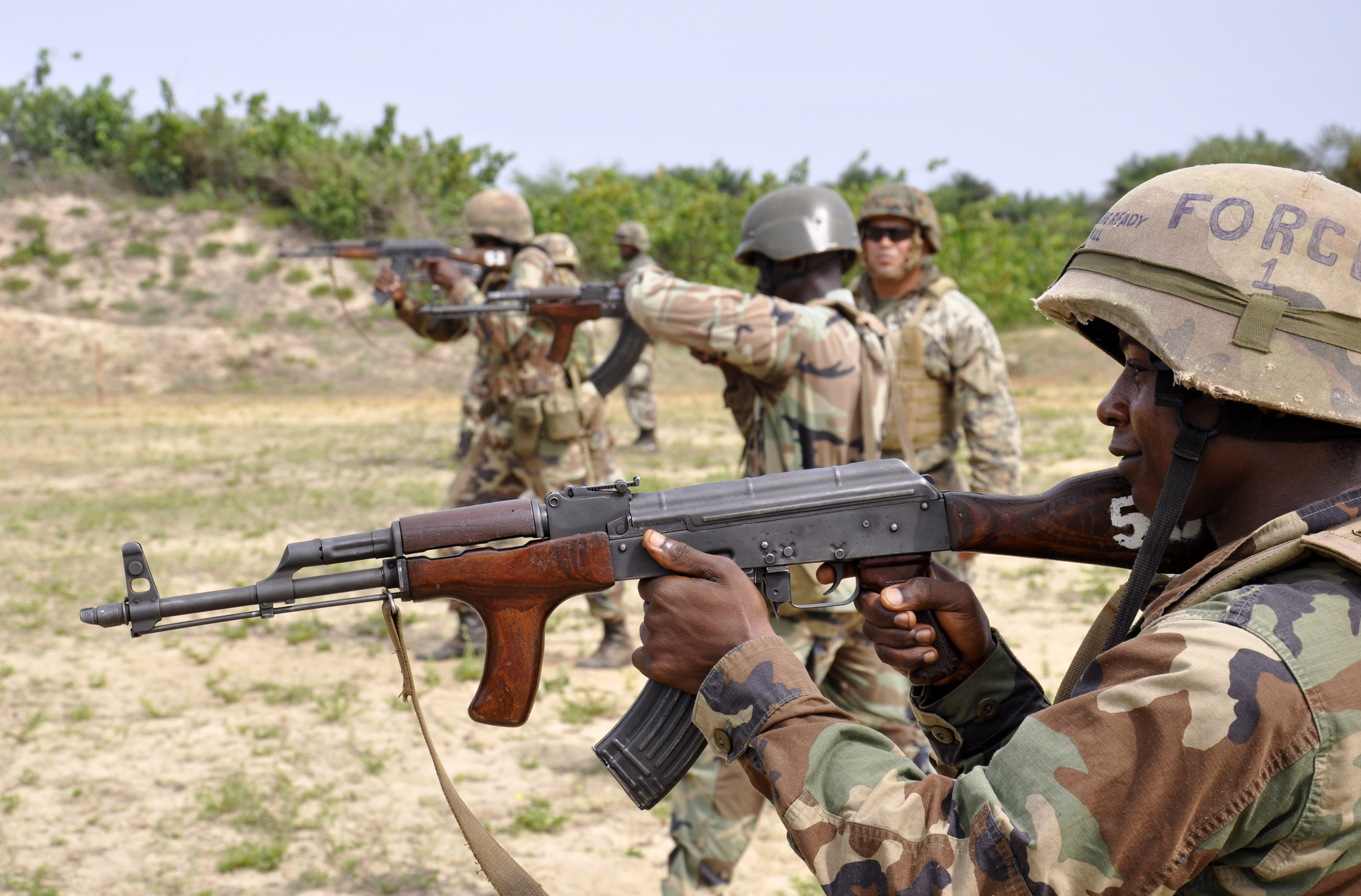
Liberian soldiers armed with MP md. 63

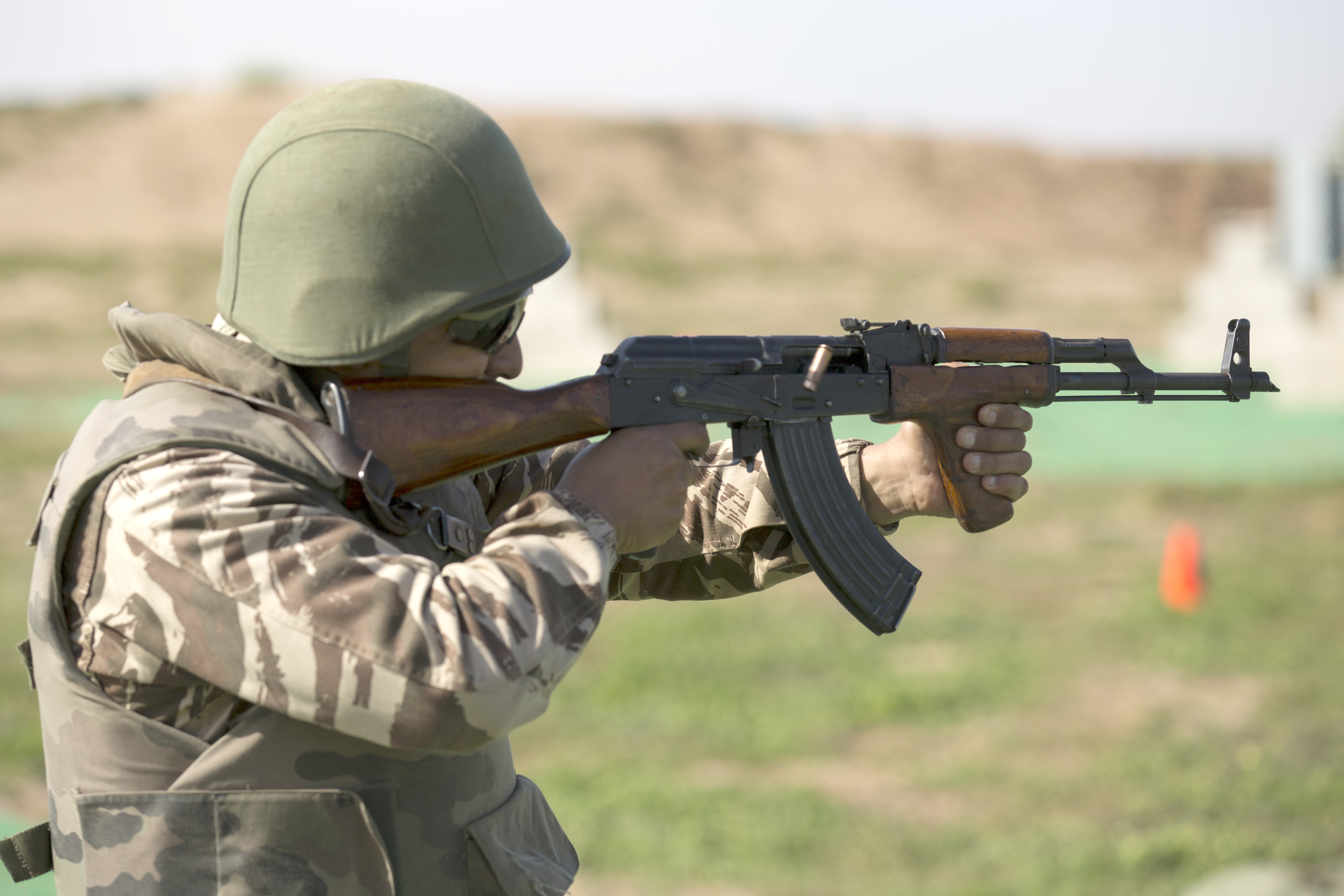
Moroccan Special Forces member with MP md. 63

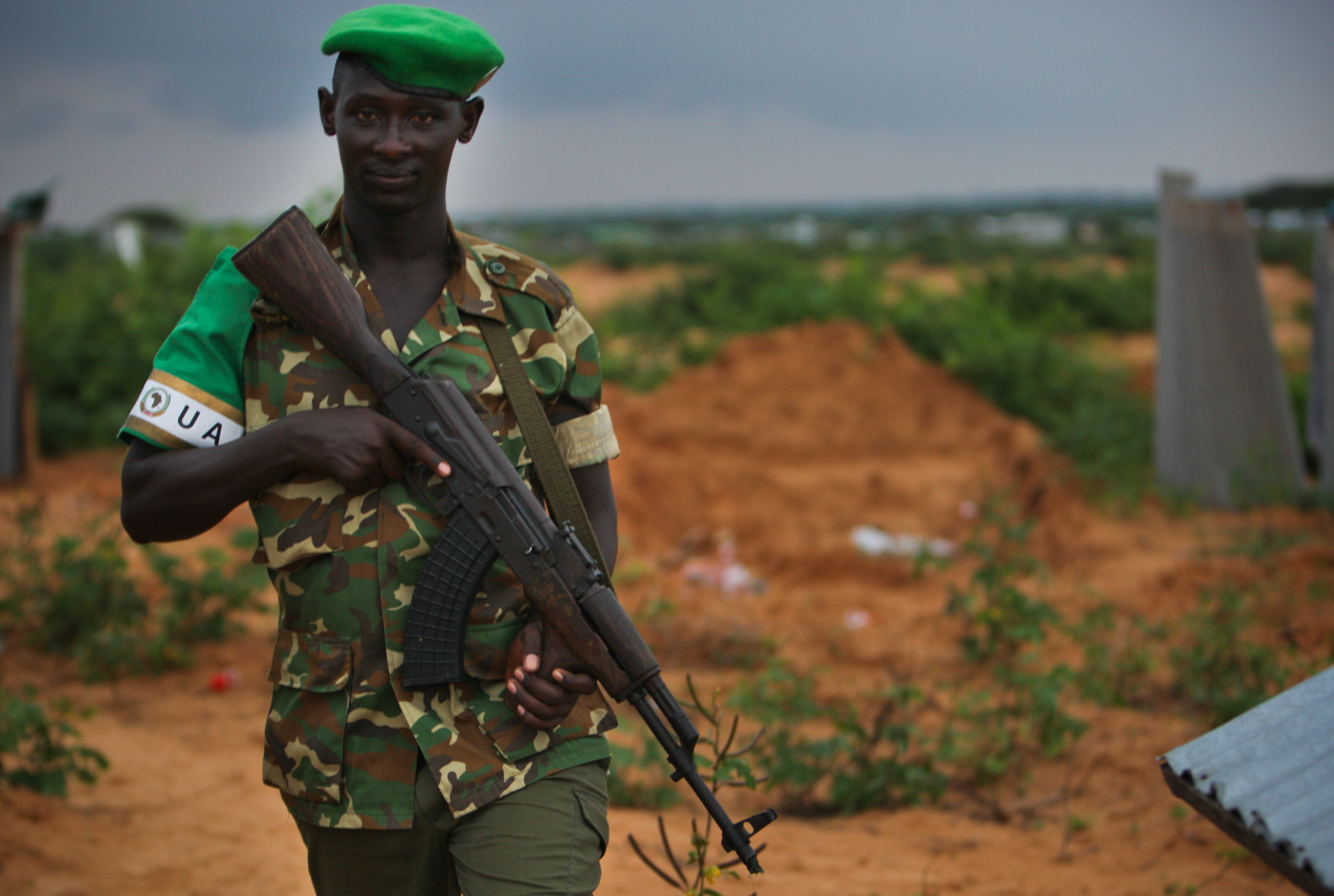
Burundian peacekeeper in Somalia armed with MP md. 63

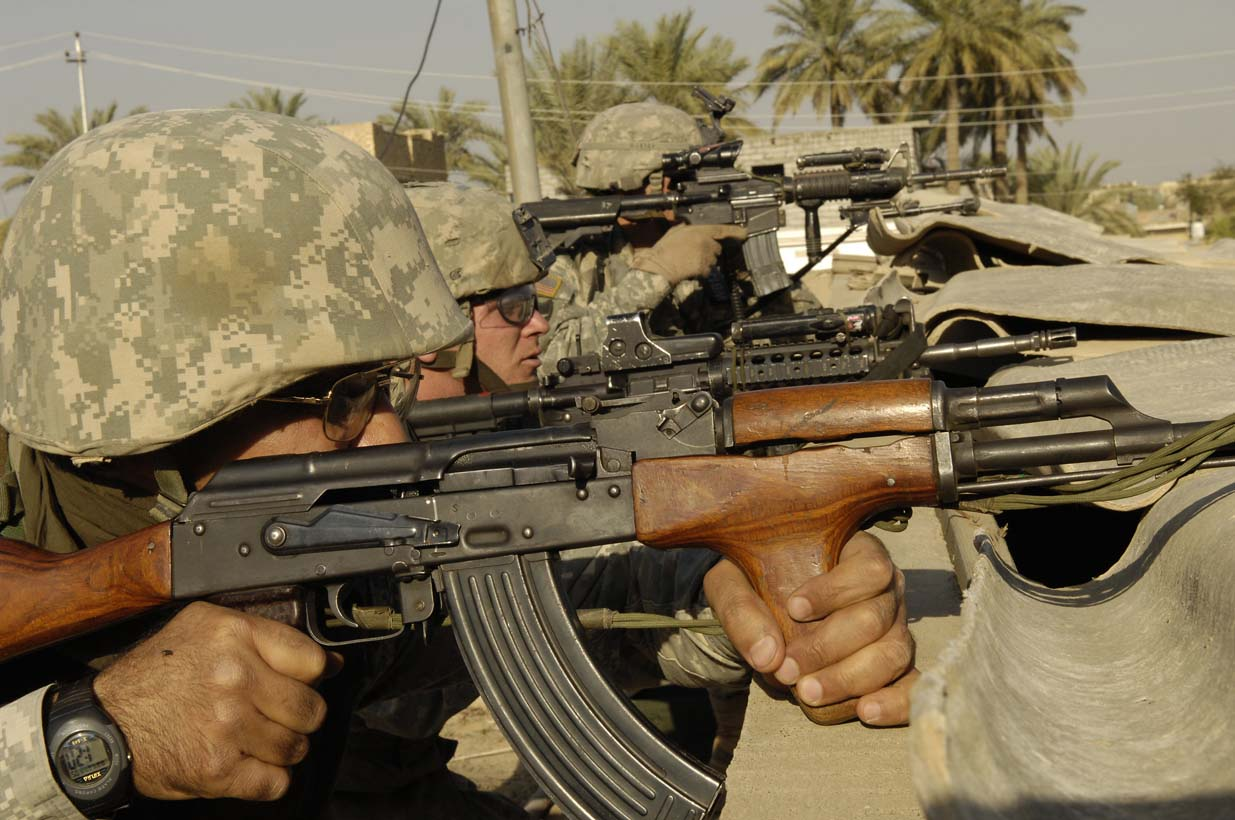
U.S. Army Soldier from the 1st Stryker Brigade Combat Team return fire on insurgents from a rooftop in Buhriz, Iraq

== See also ==
- Pușcă Automată model 1986
- WASR-series rifles
