= Tula Cartridge plant =

Company based in Tula, Russia

Tula Cartridge Works
- Founded: 1880; 146 years ago in Tula, Russian Empire
- Headquarters: Tula, Russia
- Products: Ammunition
- Brands: TulAmmo
- Website: tulammo.ru/en/

Tula Cartridge Plant, also Tula Cartridge Works (TCW) (Russian: Тульский патронный завод, Tul'skiy Patronnyj Zavod) is a private joint-stock company based in Tula, Russia. It is one of at least 6 industrial small arms ammunition factories in Russia.

The Tula Cartridge Plant is a manufacturer of metal products, including ammunition for the military, and various civilian products.

It absorbed the Ulyanovsk Cartridge Plant in 2005.

As of the 2022 invasion of Ukraine, the plant and its products are subject to international sanctions.
