= Barnaul (inhabited locality) =

Barnaul (Russian: Барнаул) is the name of several inhabited localities in Russia.

Urban localities

- Barnaul, a city Altai Krai, administratively incorporated as a city of krai significance; 53°20′N 83°45′E

Rural localities

- Barnaul, Kurgan Oblast, a village in Mostovskoy Selsoviet of Vargashinsky District in Kurgan Oblast; 55°40′N 66°16′E
