= Barnaul Cartridge Plant =

Manufacturer in Barnaul, Altai Krai, Russia

- Company type: Manufacturer
- Industry: Firearms
- Headquarters: Barnaul, Altai Krai, Russia
- Area served: worldwide
- Products: Ammunition
- Parent: BSZ Holding company www.bszholding.ru
- Website: barnaulpatron.ru

Barnaul Cartridge Plant JSC (Russian: Барнаульский патронный завод) is a manufacturer of industrial goods and ammunition in Barnaul, Altai Krai, Russia.

== History ==
The factory draws its origins to an ammunition factory established in Saint Petersburg (designated Arsenal "P") in the 19th century. It was evacuated to Podolsk in 1918 during the Russian Civil War Production was restarted under the Factory "P" designation in 1920 and was redesignated Factory 17 in 1928. During World War 2 it was evacuated again to its current location in Barnaul in 1941. The factory is part of the Barnaul Machine Tool Building Plant holding.

In June 2023, Poly Technologies was identified as supplying Barnaul Cartridge Plant with gunpowder during the Russo-Ukrainian War.

== Product lines (brands) ==
- BEAR series
  - The BEAR series is a line of hunting ammunition. The cartridges use lead-cored Full Metal Jacketed, Soft-Point (Semi-Jacketed), or Hollow Point bullets, have steel cases with Berdan primers, and use a non-corrosive propellant and primers. The sub-brands differ only in the protective coating used on the cartridge case.
  - Brown Bear ammunition cartridges have a brown lacquer coating on the steel case.
  - Silver Bear ammunition cartridges have a zinc coating on the steel case.
  - Golden Bear ammunition cartridges have a brass coating on the steel case.
- CENTAUR ammunition cartridges have a polymer coating on the steel case, are berdan primed, use non-corrosive Russian-made propellants produced by Tula machine plant., and are loaded with American-made "tombac" jacketed bullets produced by Hornady Manufacturing Company. Barnaul began a process of retooling in 2009 to produce a new line of higher-grade ammunition to compete in the American and European markets. The first CENTAUR brand ammunition was produced in 2011.
- BARNAUL series
  - Barnaul Gold ammunition cartridges, with brass cases. Currently comes in 5.56×45mm NATO and 9×19mm Parabellum.
  - Barnaul Silver ammunition cartridges, with zinc-coated steel cases. Currently comes in 5.56×45mm NATO and 9×19mm Parabellum.
- Traumatic ammunition pistol cartridges fire less-than-lethal rubber bullets. Currently comes in 9×19mm Parabellum and .45 ACP.
- Military (mil-spec) ammunition cartridges. Military cartridges made to contractor nation's specifications. It also refers to civilian 5.56×45mm NATO and 7.62×39mm M43 Soviet full-metal-jacketed lead-core bullet hunting cartridges packed in novelty 700-round Warsaw Pact-style oval-shaped vacuum-packed sheet steel "spam cans".
- MONARCH (Academy Sports) – Barnaul currently makes the steel-cased ammunition for Academy Sports + Outdoors' MONARCH brand. (Academy Sports is an American purchasing and importing group that buys foreign made ammo and resells it under their brands at their own chain of stores).

== Ammunition products ==
Source: Barnaulpatron.ru.

=== Pistol Cartridges ===
- 9×19mm Luger (9×19mm Parabellum)
- 9×18mm Makarov (9mm Makarov)
- .45 ACP

=== Shotgun Shells ===
- 410 Magnum
- 12 gauge

=== Rifle Cartridges ===
- 5.45×39mm
- 5.56×45mm NATO (.223 Remington)
- 6.5×39mm Grendel
- 6.61×51mm (.243 Winchester)
- 7.62×39mm
- 7.62×51mm (.308 Winchester)
- 7.62×54mmR
- 7.62×63mm (.30-06 Springfield)
- 9.3×64mm Brenneke

== See also ==
- Wolf Ammunition
- Red Army Standard Ammunition
- Ballistics
- Tula Arms Plant
- List of modern Russian small arms
