= Cugir Arms Factory =

Romanian state-owned defence company

Coordinates: 45.8427°N 23.3675°E

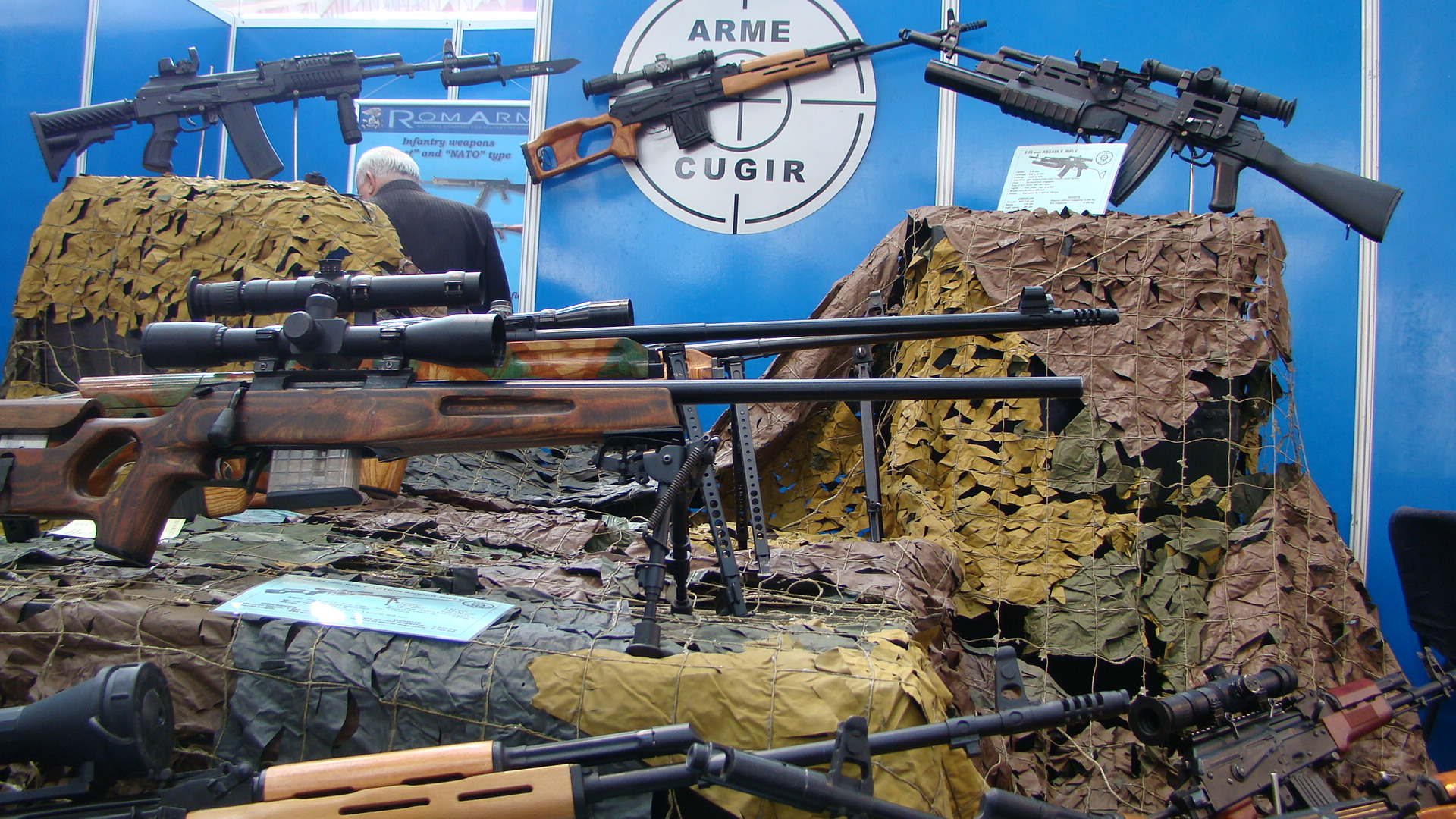
Small arms made by Cugir Arms Factory

Cugir Arms Factory is a Romanian state owned defence company that is one of the oldest defence companies of Romania. Cugir Arms Factory has a history that can be traced back to 1799 during the Austrian Empire. The steel manufacturing workshops were founded in Cugir, Romania which is one of the first metallurgical factories in Transylvania. Cugir Arms Factory now produces products compatible with NATO standards.

== History ==
In 1799, the decision was taken to establish an iron foundry in Cugir where an Austrian Grenz unit founded by Empress Maria Theresa had been operating since 1764. The foundry had two steel processing furnaces, two forging hammers, and two rolling mills. In 1850, a new hall was built with one furnace, a forging hammer, and a rolling mill. In 1880, the foundry began exporting its products throughout the Austro-Hungarian Empire and abroad. The factory was linked to the railway in 1907.

With the establishment of the Copșa Mică-Cugir Works in 1925, facility expansion started in 1926 with construction of new production halls. During the cooperation period with Vickers Armstrong Ltd. of London artillery parts and assemblies were manufactured. In 1934, Zbrojovka Brno of Czechoslovakia took over the factory which resulted redesigning the production for infantry weapons and ammunition. A year later, the first order for 5,000 ZB vz. 30 machine guns as well as their needed ammunition was placed. In 1939, after Germany had occupied Czechoslovakia, the shares of the Czechoslovak company were taken by the Reichswerke Hermann Göring. Militarization of the plant began during wartime and was managed by modern weapons manufacturing specialists.

Cugir produced the first Romanian-designed weapon 9mm caliber submachine gun, Parabellum, "Orița" type. SC Cugir Mechanical Plant SA was divided in 2004, SC Cugir Arms Factory SA, a subsidiary of the National Company ROMARM.

== Production ==
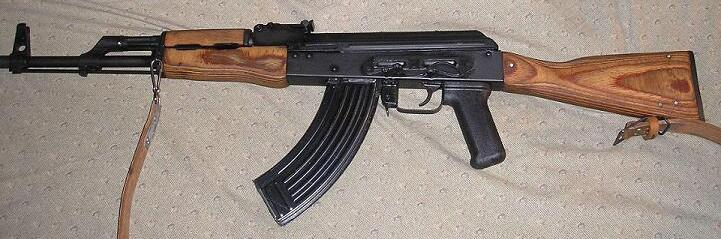
WASR-10 GP

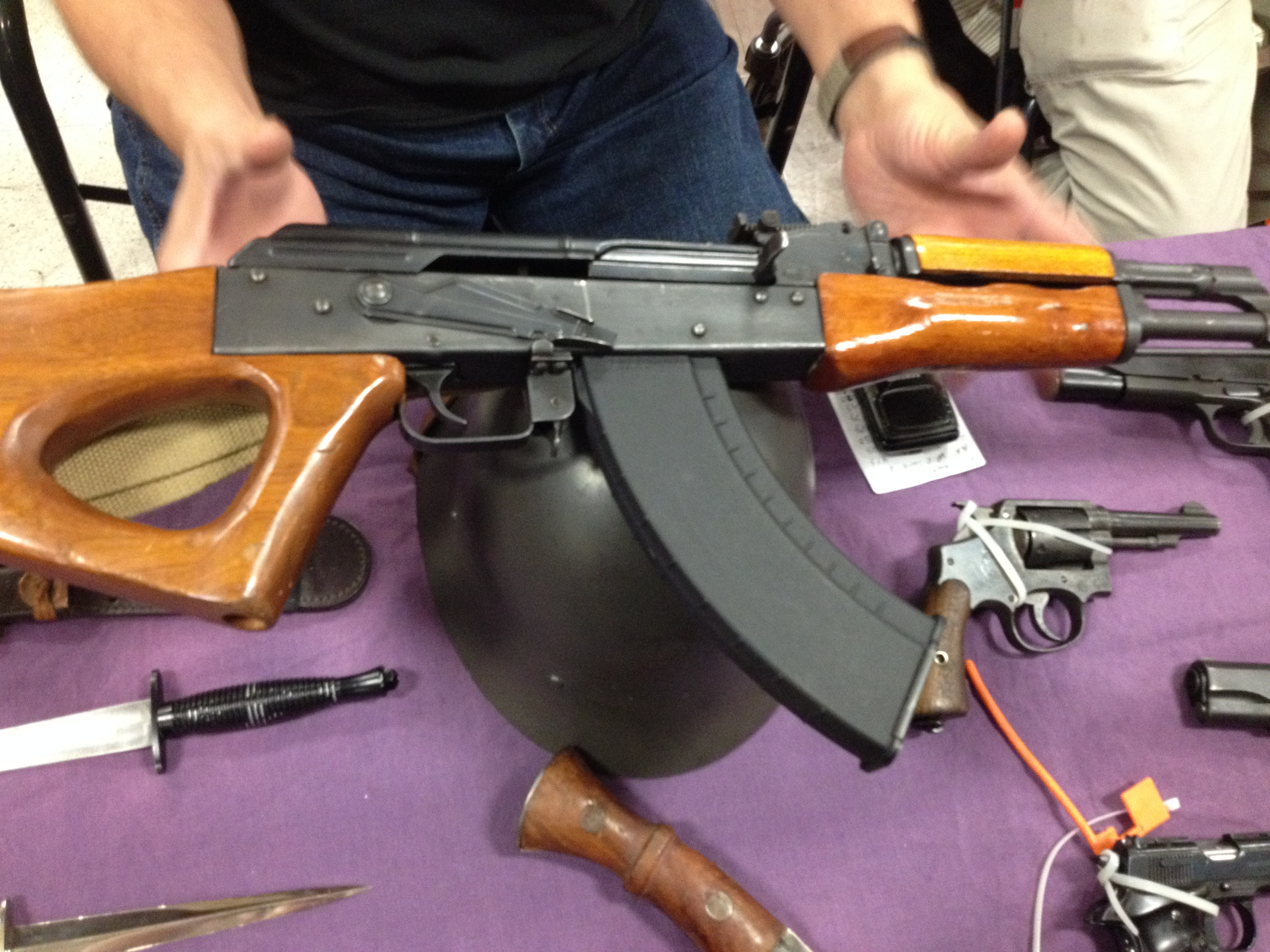
WASR-10 with thumbhole stock displayed over many pistols, knives and a military helmet

The plant produced the Pistol Mitralieră model 1963/1965 (PM md. 63), and GP 75 AKM rifles Avtomat Kalashnikova Modernizirovanniy (AKM) series of Kalashnikov rifles based on the Russian AKM design of 1959. The factory also produces the popular AK style weapon the WASR-series rifles semi-automatic only variant of the AKM rifle.

== See also ==
- Pistol Mitralieră model 1963/1965
- WASR series rifles
- ROMARM
- PSL
