= Century International Arms =

American firearms business

- Industry: Arms industry
- Genre: firearms
- Founded: 1961; 65 years ago
- Founder: William Sucher
- Headquarters: Delray Beach, Florida, United States
- Products: Ammunition, Firearms
- Revenue: $40 million
- Number of employees: 200
- Website: https://www.centuryarms.com/

Century International Arms (CIA) is an importer and manufacturer of firearms based in the United States.

== History ==
CIA was founded in 1961 in St. Albans, Vermont. The company was started after William Sucher, a typewriter repairman, took a Lee–Enfield rifle in trade against a typewriter he had repaired for a customer. Having no need for the rifle, he posted a newspaper to sell it and received more queries about the rifle than he had for typewriters. He then sought sources of surplus rifles that he could sell for a profit.

With his brother-in-law, Manny Weigensberg, Sucher made contacts in foreign countries for the importation of military surplus rifles and handguns and by the 1970s, Century became the single largest importer of firearms in the United States and Canada.

In 1993, the company headquarters and sales staff moved to Delray Beach, Florida. In November 2000, CIA acquired a 100,000-square-foot warehouse/factory in Georgia, Vermont at the Arrowhead Industrial Park.

When sources of importable surplus firearms have become scarce, Century has manufactured their own firearms. The company has manufactured versions of the G3, L1A1, AK-47 and sporterized Mausers among others. The company also imports Turkish-made Canik pistols from Canik arms.

=== Organization ===
CIA has a sister facility in Quebec, Canada under Century International Arms, Ltd.

== Firearms ==
=== Canik ===
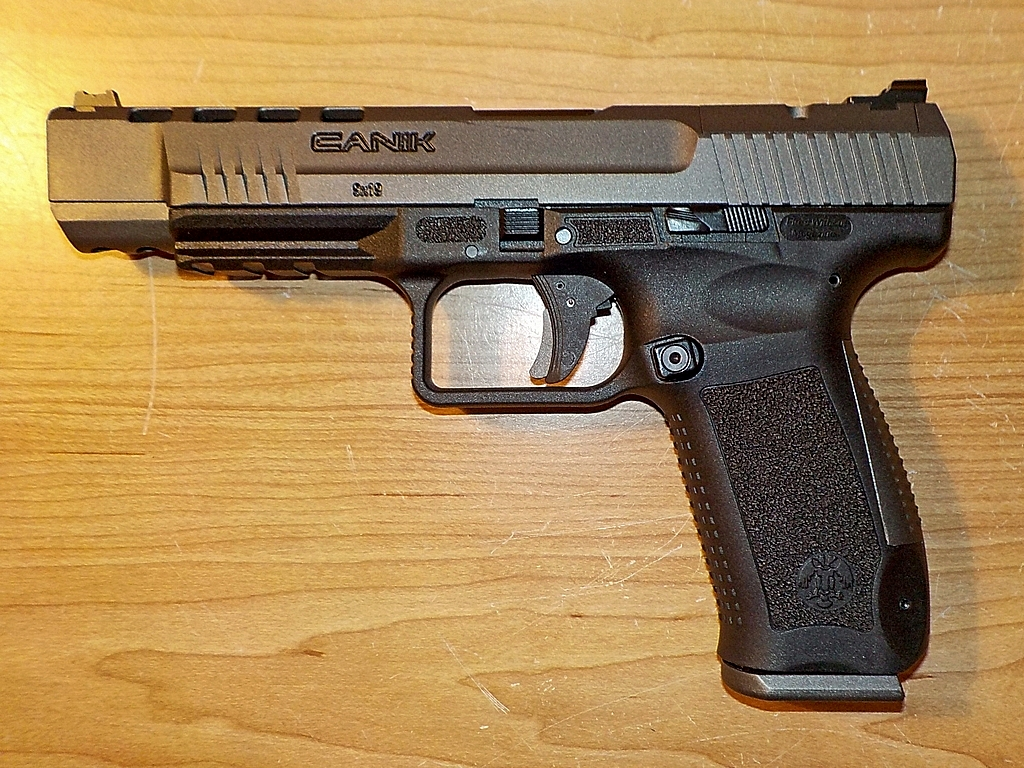
Canik TP9 SFx 9mm pistol

- Mete (An updated version)
  - Mete SFt
  - Mete SFx
  - Mete MC9
- SFx Rival
- SFx Rival-S
- TP9 (clone of Walther P99)
  - TP9 SF (Striker Fired)
  - TP9 SFx (Striker Fired Competition)
  - TP9 SA (Single Action)
  - TP9 v2
  - TP40 v2
  - TP9 SF Elite (Striker Fired Compact)
  - TP9 Elite Combat (Striker Fired Compact)
  - TP9 Elite Combat Executive (Striker Fired Compact, Black Instead of FDE)
  - TP9 Elite SC (Sub-Compact)
  - TP9 DA (Double Action)
  - TP9 SFL

=== Draco ===
- Draco Pistol

=== Others ===
- C308 (a clone of the CETME rifle)
- C39/C39V2 (clones of the AK-47)
- L1A1
- RAS47 (clone of the AKM)
- SKS rifle
- SSG 82
- vz. 24
- vz. 50
- WASR-series rifles
- Zastava M57
- Zastava M70
- VSKA (clone of the AKM)
- BFT-47 (AKM clone with RPK-style front trunnion)
- BFT-556 (5.56 chambered version of BFT-47)

== Ammunition ==
In addition to importing bulk surplus ammunition, Century is the US importer and distributor for Red Army Standard Ammunition.
