= KM2000 =

German Army standard combat knife

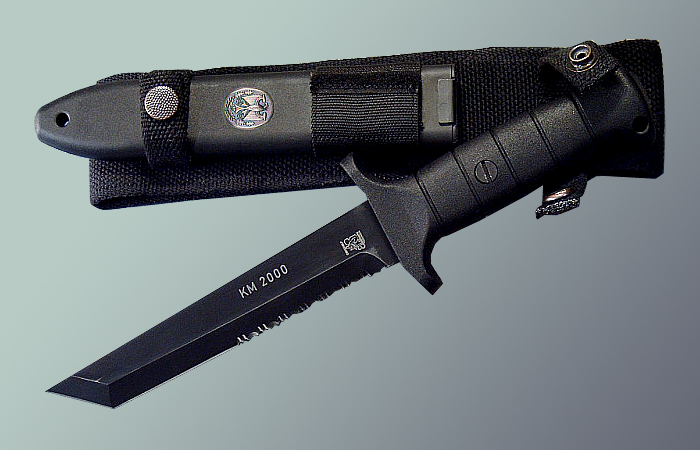
- Type: Combat knife
- Place of origin: Germany

Service history
- Wars: War in Afghanistan, United Nations Multidimensional Integrated Stabilization Mission in Mali

Production history
- Designer: Eickhorn-Solingen GmbH
- Manufacturer: Eickhorn-Solingen GmbH

The KM2000 (German: Kampfmesser 2000, lit. 'Combat knife 2000') is the standard combat knife of the German Bundeswehr.

== Production ==
The knife is manufactured in Germany by the Eickhorn-Solingen company (aka "Original Eickhorn").

The knife is produced according to NATO regulations by the German company Eickhorn-Solingen GmbH.

== Design ==
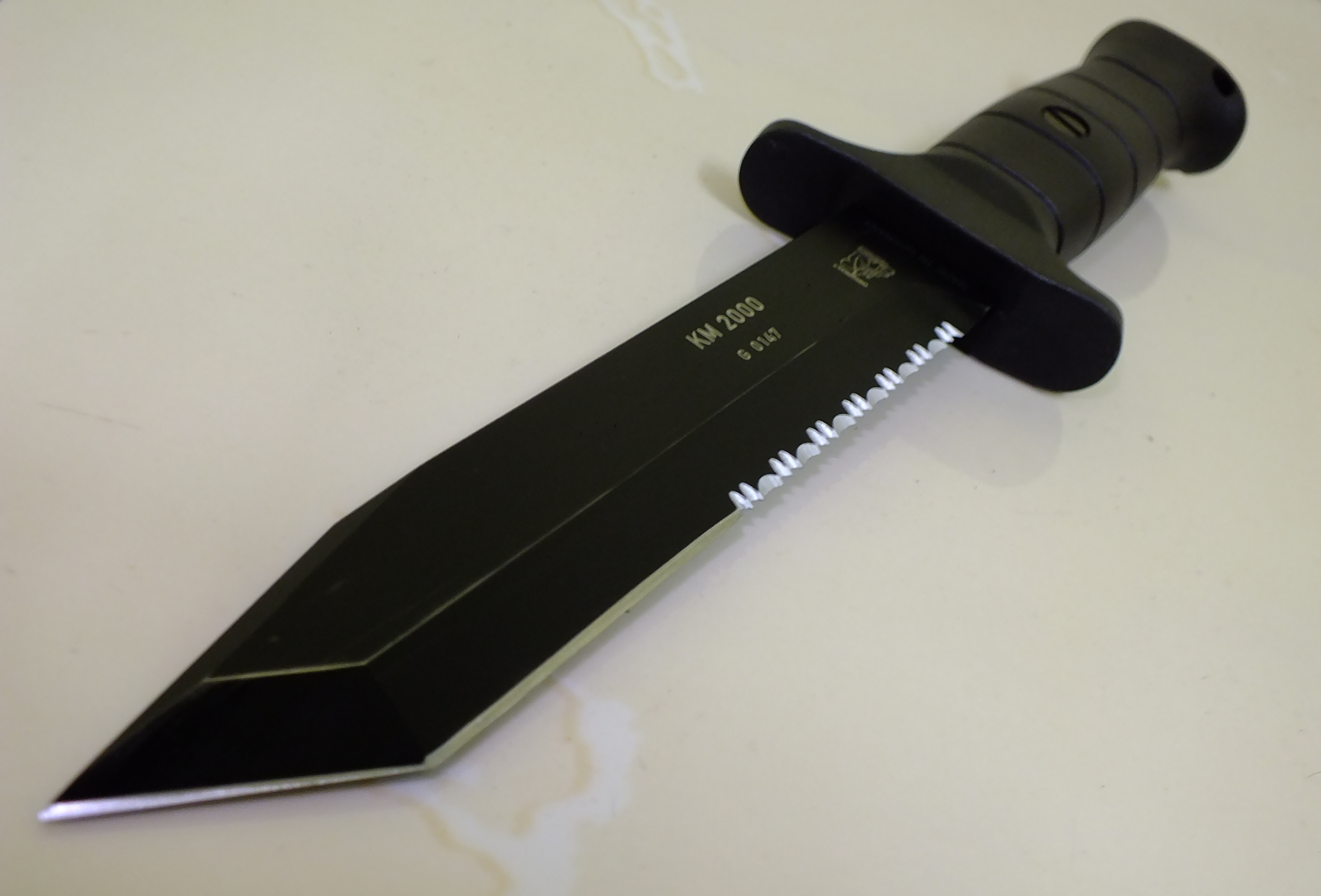
New Model of KM2000

The assembly consists of three components: the laser cut 172 mm Black Kalgard coated, forged X55CrMo14 or 1.4110 (440A) stainless steel Westernized tantō blade, the ergonomic ambidextrous polyamide handle and screw.

The entire knife weighs approximately 320 grams (11 oz). The sheath for the KM2000 is turnable, and includes an adapter to allow it to be mounted onto the MOLLE/PALS load bearing system(s).

Later revisions of the KM2000 (as of 2008) use a different stainless blade steel alloy with better edge-holding properties, X105CrMo17 or 1.4125 (440C) Böhler N695 (HRC 57).

Apart from the hard polyamide sheath, a special leather sheath is available from Eickhorn.

The newer version of the KM2000 has a modified tip for greater strength and stability while thrusting and prying windows and containers open.

The blade of both models has two versions: plain and partially serrated. The serrations are used for cutting ropes and fabric fibers for survival techniques. The scabbard has a strip of diamond sharpener used for field sharpening of the knife.

The handle end has a glass breaker tip which is actually the end of the knife blade tang and a lanyard hole.

The scabbard is MOLLE and IDZ military vest compatible.

== Variants ==
Based on the popularity of the design, Eickhorn has developed the line-up introducing many variations in shape, material used, colors.

Models other than KM2000 are also introduced by Eickhorn such as Para-Commando, KM5000, FS knife etc. Most of these variations are not actually issued in the German Army.

=== KM1000 ===
KM2000 without blade-coating. Available with sand-colored grips and scabbards intended in desert environments like Afghanistan.

=== KM3000 ===
KM2000 with a spear-point blade instead of the KM2000's westernized-tanto point. Available with sand-colored grips and scabbards intended in desert environments like Afghanistan.

=== Desert Command I ===
KM2000 variant for desert environment.

=== Desert Command II ===
KM3000 variant for desert environment.

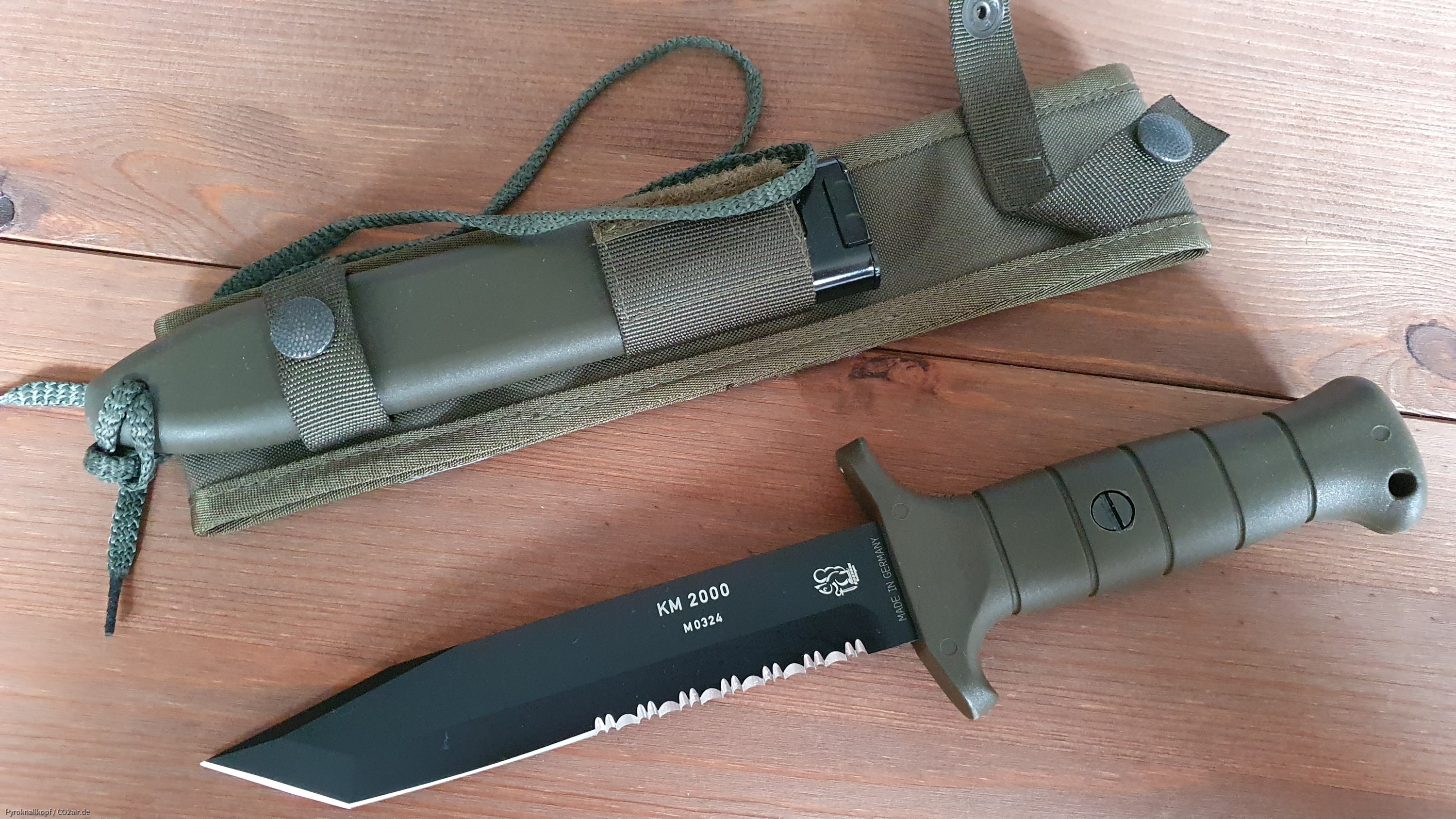

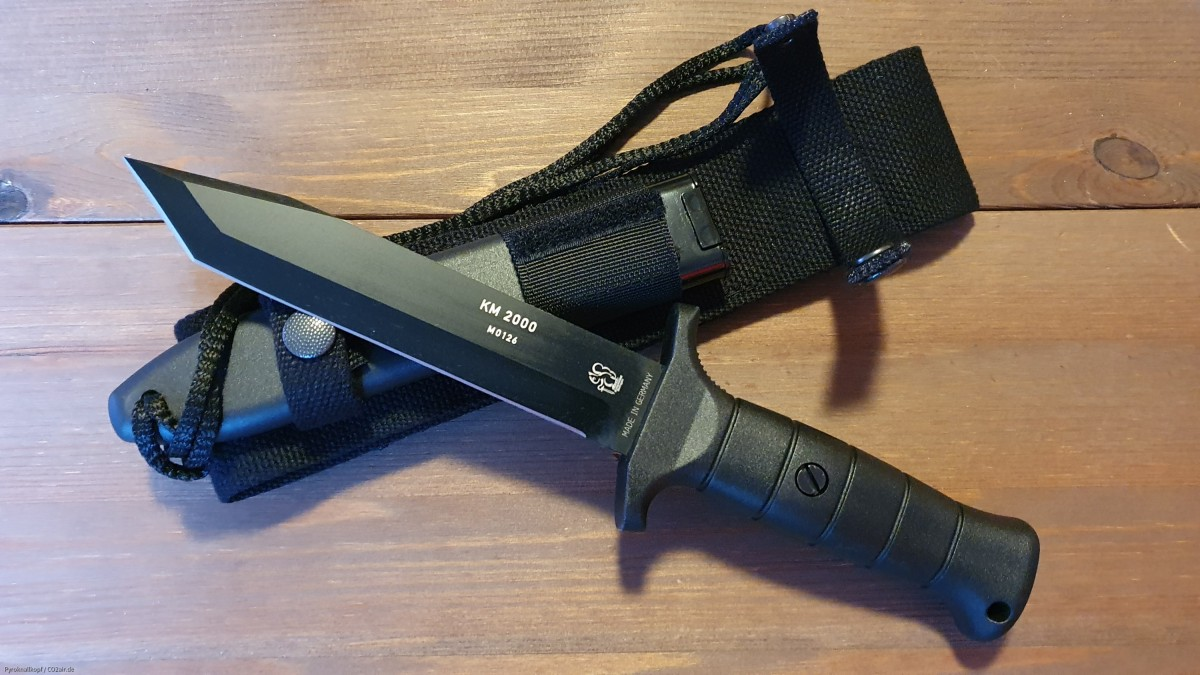

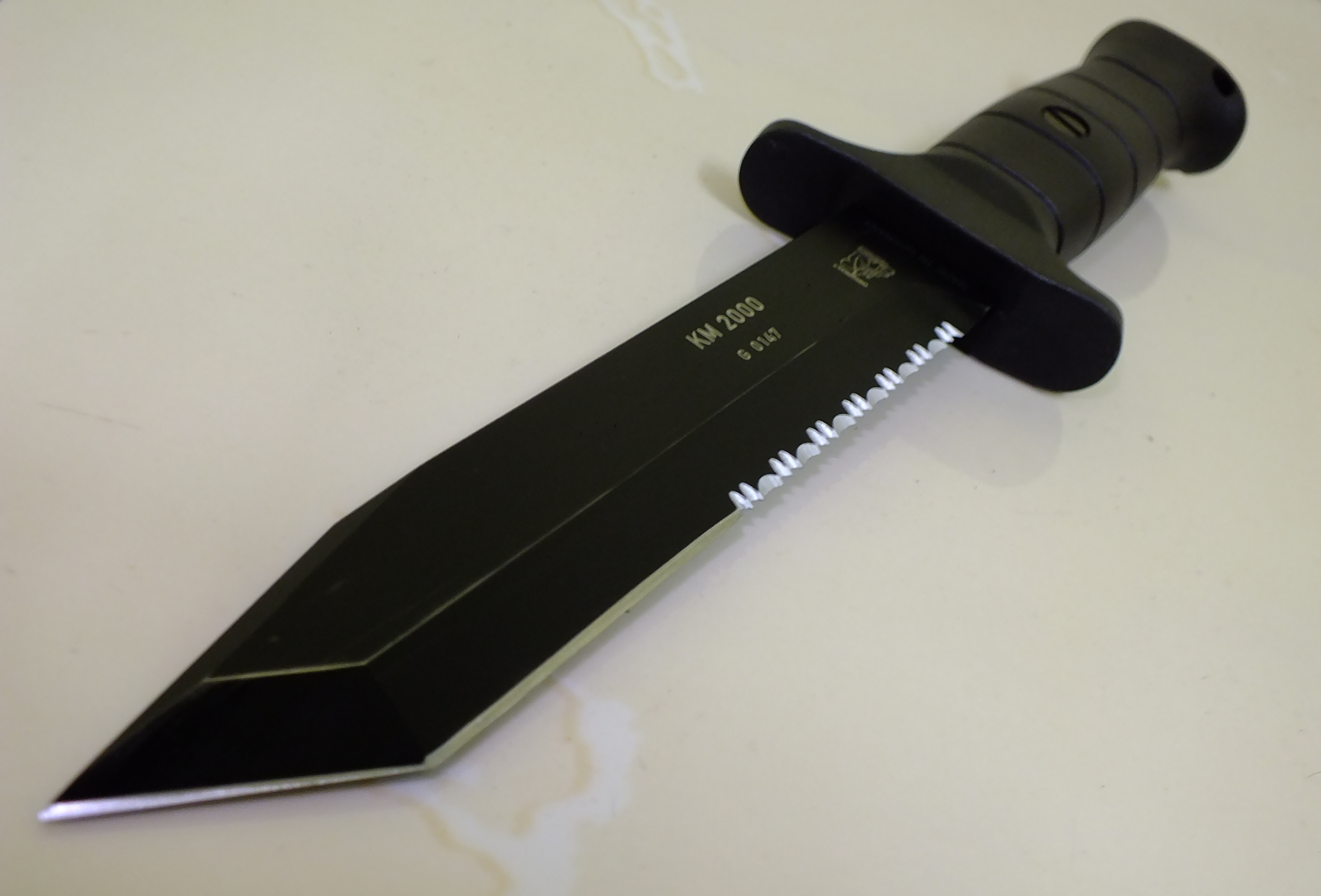

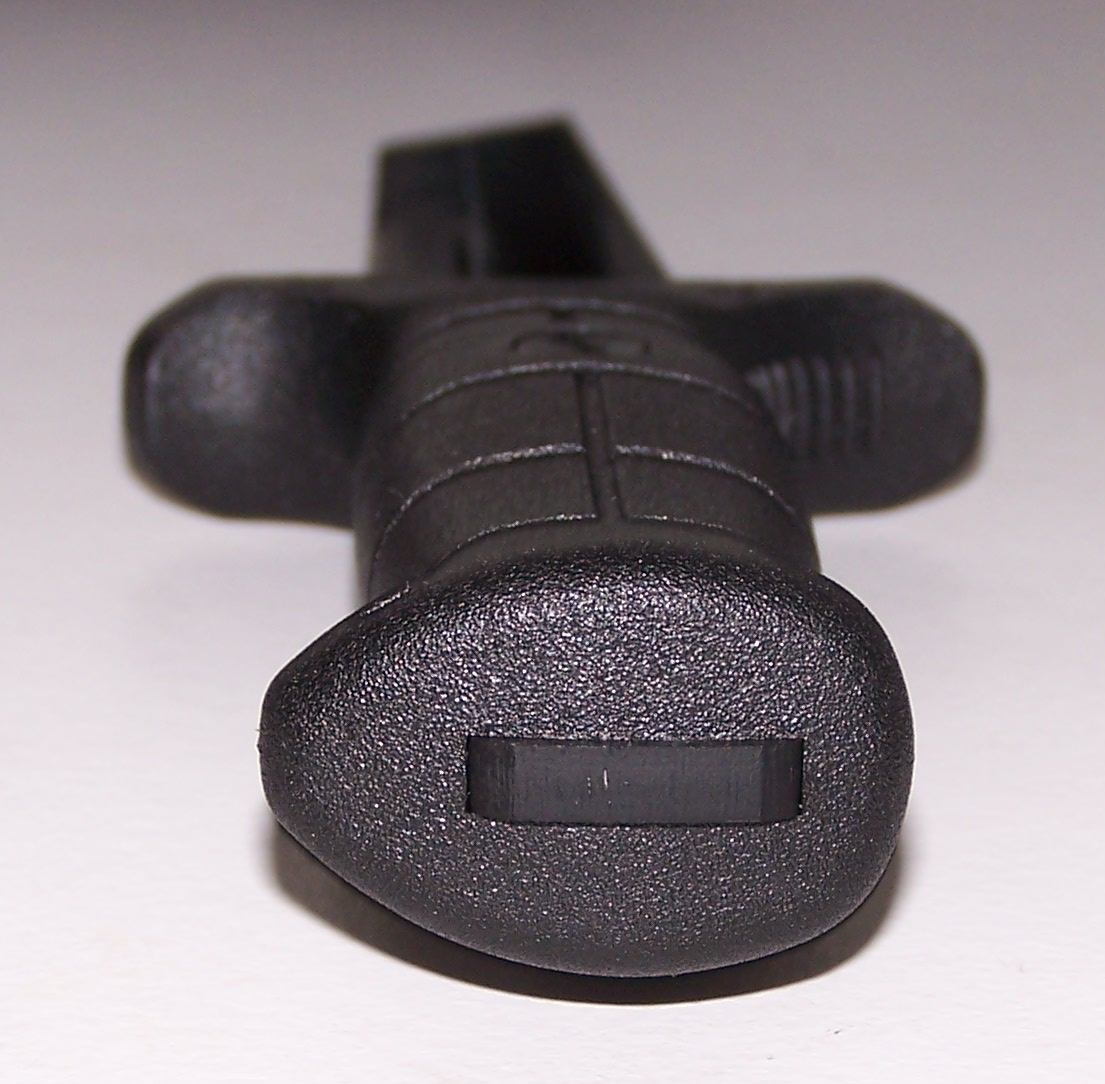

== Users ==
- Germany
  - German Army

== Legacy ==
The KM2000 owes a lot of its fame to the fact that it is among the few (if not the only) "tantō"-style military knives actually issued in significant numbers.

== See also ==
- Bayonet
- M9 bayonet
- Glock knife
- 6KH2 bayonet
- 6KH3 bayonet
- 6KH4 bayonet
- 6KH5 bayonet
- 6KH9 bayonet
