= Military knife wz. 92 =

- Type: Knife
- Place of origin: Poland

Service history
- Wars: NATO intervention in Bosnia and Herzegovina; 2003 invasion of Iraq

Production history
- Designer: Emil Pąsiek
- Designed: 1992
- Developed from: Military knife wz. 55
- Developed into: Military knife wz. 98
- Produced: 1993-1998
- No. built: 3000+ (1994)

Specifications
- Mass: 280 g
- Length: 301 mm
- Blade length: 177 mm

The wz. 92 (Polish: Nóż wojskowy wz. 92, lit. 'Military knife Type 92') was a Polish military combat knife issued in 1993.

== History ==
In the early 90s, the 62nd Special Company, stationed in Bolesławiec, created a project for a combat knife that would replace the heavily used wz. 55 knives used by special units of the Polish Army.

The initial designation of the new special knife was 62 KS.

After passing a series of tests and examinations at the Military Institute of Armament Technology, the "62 KS" combat knife was ordered by the Ministry of National Defense for special units of the Polish Army, but with a new designation - military knife wz. 92.

The first order, placed by the Polish Army, opted for over 3,000 of these knives, which were successively delivered to units in the years 1993–1994.

== Design ==
The wz.92 was created for soldiers in reconnaissance, assault and airborn units and special forces.

The purpose of the wz.92 military knife, apart from its typical applications, is the ability to throw at a target at considerable distances.

Unlike wz.55, it guarantees good balance and relatively low weight, and also ensures proper bending strength and high resistance to crushing - typical wz.55 dysfunctions to which the knife is subjected in combat conditions.

The strong, steel head of the handle allows for all kinds of blows aimed at the opponent, it can also act as a hammer.

=== Knife ===
The knife's blade is made of hardened spring steel, chemically blackened or electroplated, providing satisfactory bending strength and resistance to chipping.

The straight blade, 173 mm long, 23.5 mm wide at the base and 5 mm thick at two-thirds of its length, is single-edged, then double-edged. At about two-thirds of the total length of the blade (starting at the base of the ledge and ending at the height where the blade transitions into the feather), there is a dorsal groove, occurring on both sides.

The spine of the blade is flat. The feather is symmetrical, double-edged. The point is centric, pointed. The blade under the guard with a small blunt ledge modeled by a flat fuller.

The guard is made of hardened steel, black oxidized, 60 mm long. The dorsal arm has a rectangular hole for the catch spring located at the scabbard. The handle grip is spindle-shaped, made of oil-resistant rubber, ensuring proper grip in any climatic conditions.

The handle is notched (9 horizontal notches). The head is made of steel, flat, round in cross-section, black oxidized. After unscrewing the head of the handle, you can place 3 pcs. 9 mm cartridges or a micro survival kit inside.

On the threshold of the front flat of the blade there is a stylized EP and DESIGN badge, from EP [Emil Pąsiek] Design.

=== Sheath ===
A 179 mm long sheath. Made of black, high-impact plastic, straight, with two ears for hanging.

The latch spring passing through the hole in the knife's guard and holding the knife was screwed to the mouth of the sheath (from the dorsal side) using two screws with flat, round washers.

On the outside of the sheath (at its bottom) there is a long, narrow ear through which a stylon cord is interwoven, wrapping the sheath with ten turns, used to tie it to the thigh.

The mouth of the sheath from the inside passes into a long, straight, narrow ear for threading a belt through. Two holes of different sizes were drilled in the ear. The upper hole is designed to thread the main belt of the uniform through it, and through the lower one a smaller belt.

== Users ==
- Poland
- Slovakia
  - Unknown number
    - Slovak Border Guard

== See also ==
- Military knife wz. 98
- Combat knife
- Survival knife
- Glock knife
- 6KH2 bayonet
- 6KH3 bayonet
- 6KH4 bayonet
- 6KH5 bayonet
- 6KH9 bayonet
