= Military knife wz. 98 =

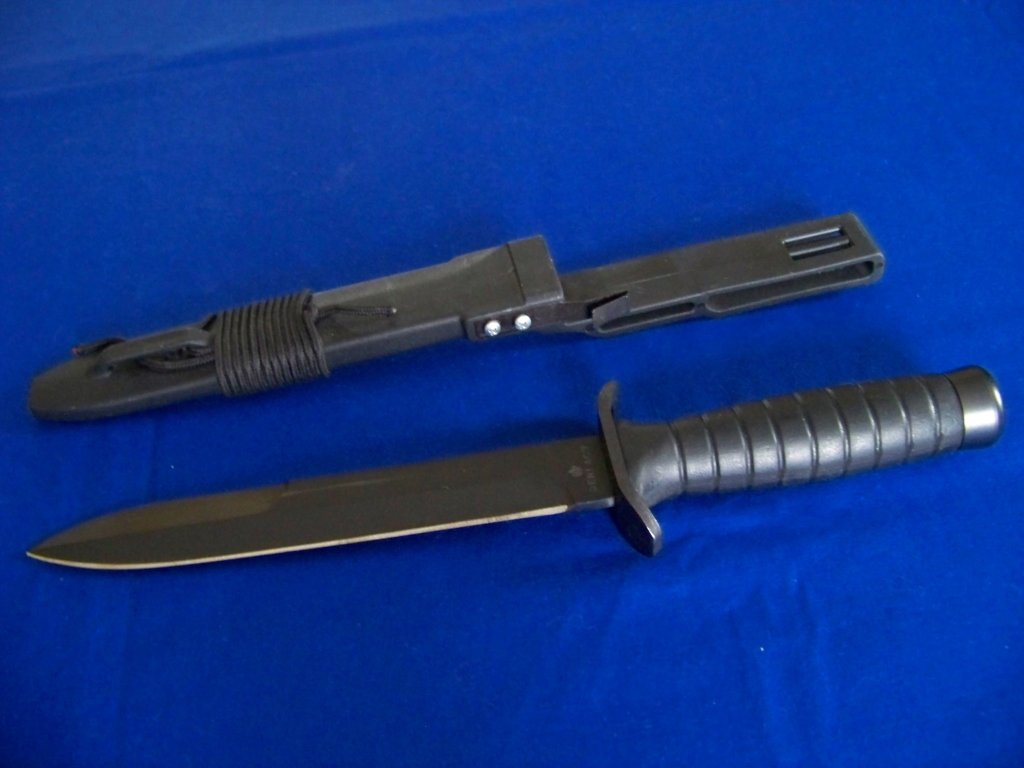
- Type: Knife
- Place of origin: Poland

Service history
- Wars: 2003 invasion of Iraq

Production history
- Designed: 1998
- Developed from: Military knife wz. 92
- Unit cost: 240 Polish złoty ~ 60 USD
- Produced: 1998-present
- Variants: wz. 98 wz. 98A wz. 98Z

Specifications
- Mass: 280 g
- Length: 301 mm
- Blade length: 177 mm

The wz. 98 military knife (Polish: Nóż wojskowy wz. 98, lit. 'Military knife Type 98') was a fighting knife issued in 1998 to the Polish Armed Forces.

== Design ==
The wz.98 is an improved version of its predecessor, the wz. 92 military knife.

All changes that have been made to this knife are dictated by suggestions and comments made by civilian users of the wz. 92 knife, especially those related to survival and scouting.

The purpose of the knife modification was to increase the resistance to dynamic loads and, if possible, to obtain a corrosion-resistant blade. The great strength of this knife, just like its predecessor, allows the user to throw at the target at considerable distances.

The knife blade is made of hardened spring steel, additionally it is chemically blackened or electroplated, which reduces the reflections from the blade surface.

The blade made of this type of material provides high bending strength and resistance to all types of material chipping.

The straight blade with a length of 173 mm, width at the base 23.5 mm and thickness of 5 mm at two-thirds of its length is single-edged, then double-edged.

Compared to the wz. 92 knife, the blade has been omitted. The blade spine is flat. The symmetrical, double-edged blade. The centric, pointed tip.

The blade under the guard with a small blunt threshold modeled by flat fullers. The guard made of hardened steel, black-oxide, 60 mm long protects the hand from accidentally sliding onto the blade while operating the knife.

The handle is spindle-shaped, made of oil-resistant rubber, ensuring proper grip in any climatic conditions. The handle is notched – 9 horizontal notches are made. The head of the handle is steel, flat, round in cross-section, black oxidized, allows for all types of blows; it can also function as a hammer.

The scabbard is 179 mm long. Made of black, high-impact plastic, straight, with two eyes for hanging.

The latch spring that passes through the hole in the knife guard and holds the knife is screwed to the dorsal side of the scabbard outlet using two screws with flat, round washers.

On the outside of the scabbard, at its bottom, there is a long, narrow eyelet through which a stylon cord is interwoven, wrapping the scabbard with ten turns, used to tie it to the thigh.

The scabbard outlet from the inside turns into a long, straight, narrow eyelet for threading a belt through.

Two holes of different sizes have been drilled in the ear. The upper hole is designed to thread the main uniform belt through it, while the lower one is used to thread a smaller belt through it.

== Variants ==
=== Wz. 98A ===
The wz. 98 dagger version has a modified blade which is symmetrical, having two cutting edges, sharpened along the entire length of the blade. This model was made with particular consideration of the needs of reconnaissance and commando units.

This change made it an excellent weapon in direct confrontation with the enemy. It also increased its effectiveness in the case of throws at targets at considerable distances.

In addition to its military purpose, this dagger can also be used in technical rescue, hunting or in various types of extreme sports.

=== Wz. 98Z ===
The wz. 98Z knife is a development and improvement of the wz. 98 knife, equipped of the blade with a saw.

This resulted from subsequent tips from its users. Apart from that, the general shape and strengths have not changed.

The aim of this modification was to increase its versatility, adding to its previous possibilities of cutting and sawing all kinds of objects.

== Users ==
- Poland

== See also ==
- Combat knife
- Survival knife
- Glock knife
- 6KH2 bayonet
- 6KH3 bayonet
- 6KH4 bayonet
- 6KH5 bayonet
- 6KH9 bayonet
