= Tactical reload =

Gun reloading method

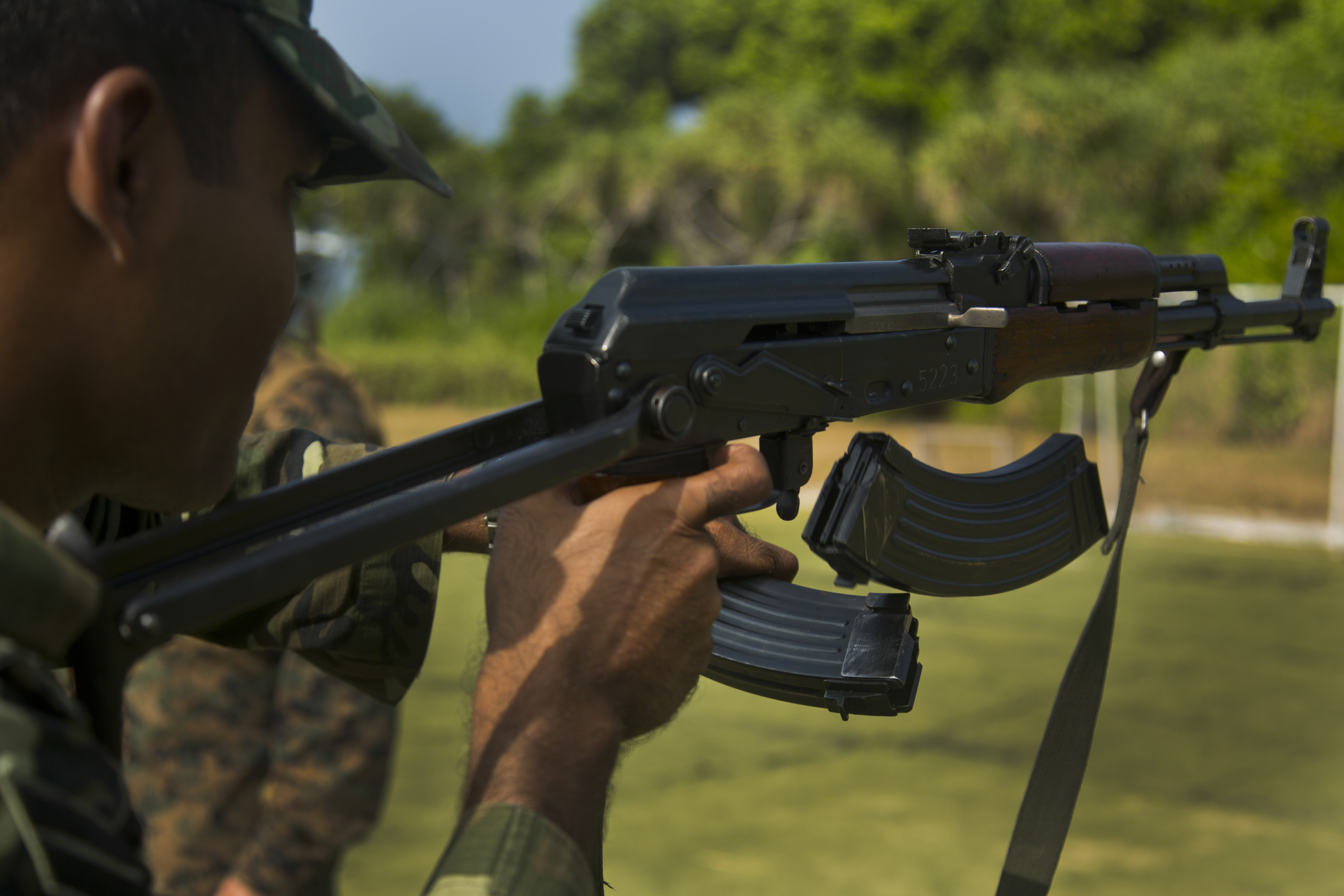
Maldivian marine demonstrating a speed reload technique for the AK platform where the new magazine is used to eject the previous one

A tactical reload is reloading a weapon that has only fired a few rounds out of its magazine, while retaining the original magazine. An example is an infantryman reloading before entering a hostile building, concerned about ammunition. Tactical doctrine states that one should always have a full magazine before entering the building or hostile situation, but it is also bad practice to throw away ammunition in case it is needed.

A tactical reload is executed by ejecting the magazine and retaining it while inserting a new magazine. The partially expended magazine can then be used later.

== Advantages and disadvantages ==
The main advantage of a tactical reload as opposed to a speed reload is that rounds remain in the partially spent magazine for future use. This can be important in first-person shooter games such as the majority of Call of Duty games.

The main disadvantage of a tactical reload as opposed to a speed reload is that reloading is slower.
