= QNL-95 =

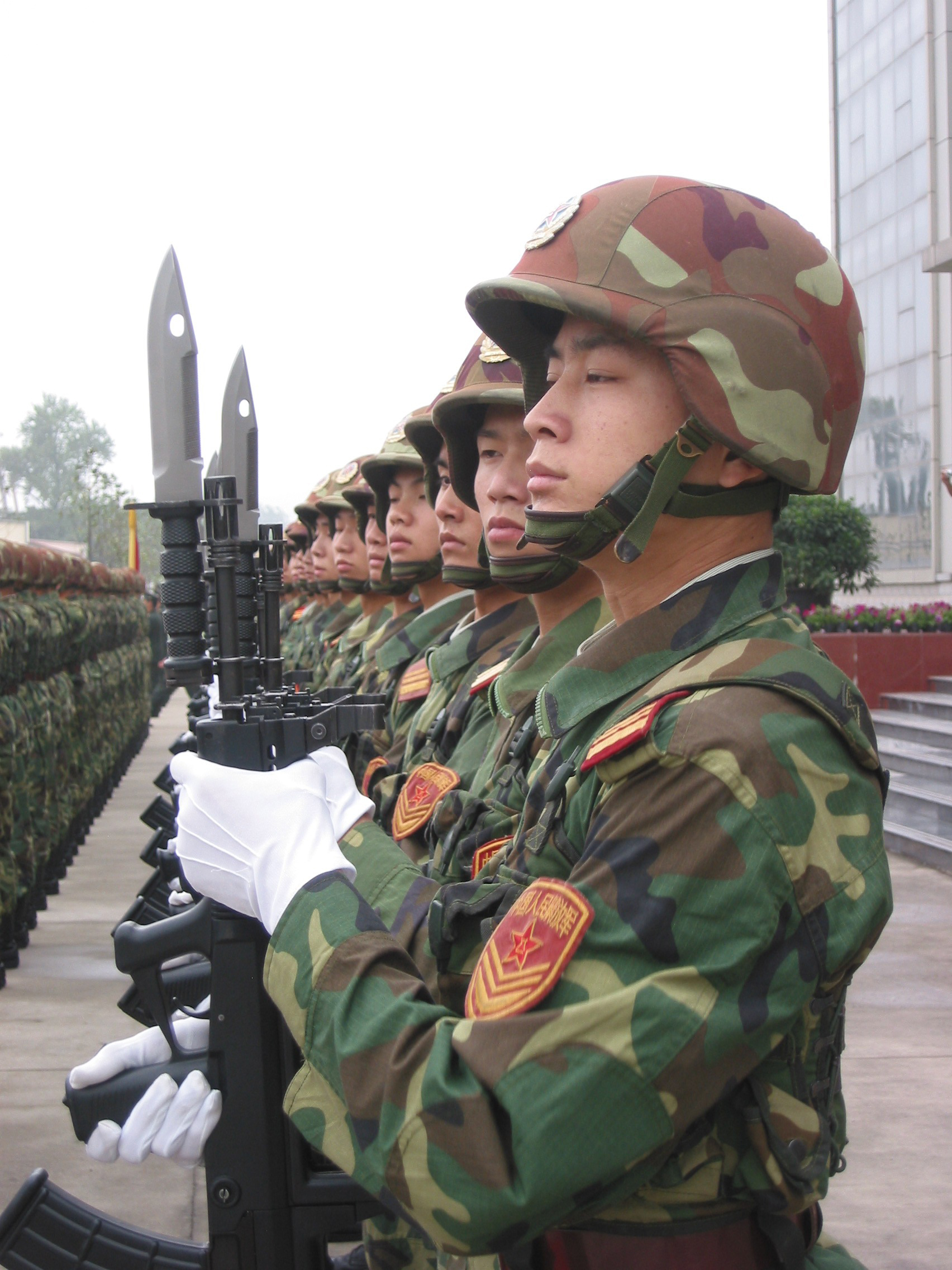
- QNL-95 bayonets fixed on QBZ-95 rifles used by the PLA Honour Guards
- Type: Bayonet
- Place of origin: People’s Republic of China

Service history
- In service: 1995 - present

Production history
- Designer: Norinco
- Manufacturer: Norinco

The QNL-95 (Chinese: 95式多用途刺刀, lit. 'Type 95 Multi-use Bayonet') is a Chinese-designed and manufactured combat knife.

== History ==
Previously, the PLA adopted Soviet bayonet designs.

Notable examples include the Type 56 (Chinese: 56式) inspired by 6KH2 and the Type 86 (Chinese: 86式) inspired by 6KH4, for their AK rifles.

However, as they're integral folding spike bayonets, it was not intended as a combat knife, which could affect the durability of the blade negatively if misused.

Prior to the adoption of the QNL-95, Xianfeng Industries (Chinese: 先锋工业) copied the M9 bayonet as the D91 bayonet, intended to be an accessory for the Type 81 assault rifle. However, it was ultimately neither adopted nor mass-produced.

The QNL-87 (Chinese: 87式刺刀, lit. 'Type 87 Bayonet') served as the first PLA knife bayonet, before being replaced by the QNL-95 alongside the QBZ-95 rifle.

The QNL-95 is the current issue knife bayonet of the People's Liberation Army.

== Design ==
The QNL-95 is a multi-purpose bayonet and knife, like its predecessor QNL-87.

While it may externally resemble the American M9 bayonet, there are differences between M9 and QNL-95 grips.

As a rifle accessory, the QNL-95 can be affixed to various PLA service weapons, including the QBZ-95, QBZ-95-1, QBZ-03, QBS-06 and QBZ-191. It may also be used as a standalone combat knife.

== Variants ==
=== QNL-06 ===
The QNL-06 (Note: Chinese: 06式水下刺刀, lit. 'Type 06 underwater bayonet') is a diving knife design partly inspired by the QNL-95, alongside the Type 05 (Note: Chinese: 05式潛水刀, lit. 'Type 05 dive knife'), which is optimised for special forces members in amphibious and underwater operations, used alongside the QBS-06 underwater rifle.

=== QNL-191 ===
While customised for the QBZ-191, the QNL-191 (Note: Chinese: 191式刺刀, lit. 'Type 191 bayonet'; also known as the QKC-191) is based on the QNL-95 with additional features from PLA combat knives included.

An experimental QNL-191 variant which is equipped with a tantō-style blade is in production and currently issued to PLA forces.

== Users ==
- China

== See also ==
- M1 bayonet
- M3 trench knife
- M4 bayonet
- M5 bayonet
- M6 bayonet
- M7 bayonet
- Mk 3 knife
- Strider SMF
- Glock knife
- Aircrew Survival Egress Knife
- OKC-3S Bayonet
- KA-BAR
- 6KH2 bayonet
- 6KH3 bayonet
- 6KH4 bayonet
- 6KH5 bayonet
- 6KH9 bayonet
