= Speed reload =

Reloading a weapon in a very short amount of time

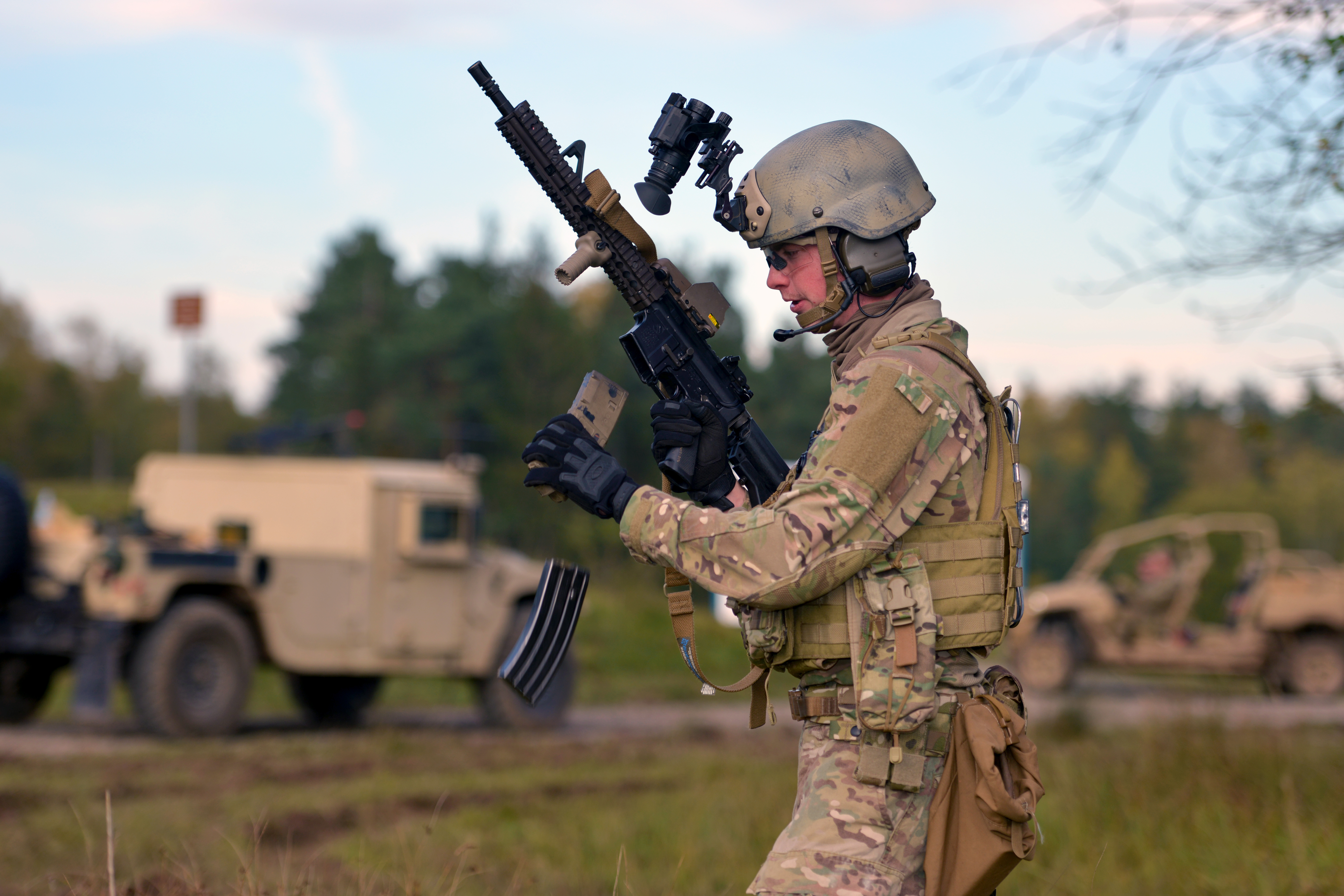
10th Special Forces soldier inserting a new magazine into his M4 carbine as the previous magazine falls to the ground in a manner typical of a speed reload

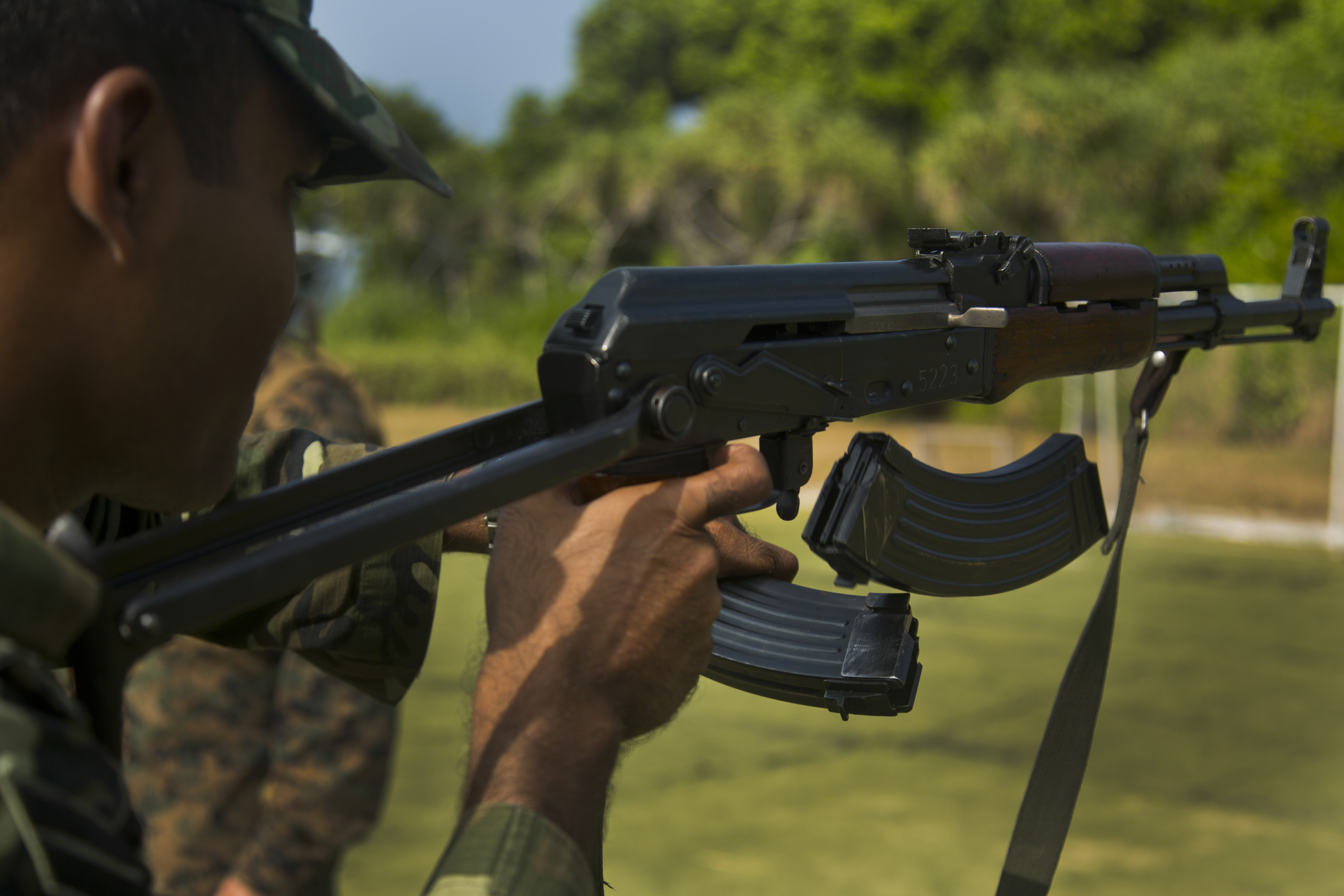
Maldivian marine demonstrating a speed reload technique for the AK platform where the new magazine is used to eject the previous one

A speed reload / combat reload is the action of reloading a weapon in a very short amount of time by ejecting the currently loaded magazine with one hand without retaining it, and drawing as well as loading a fresh magazine with the other hand.

A speed load is quite similar to a regular reload of a weapon, but when well performed can afford a large speed advantage. With closed bolt weapons, the speed advantage is lost if they do not have a round in the chamber, as the gun will then require cocking with the new magazine inserted to chamber the first round. This does not apply to open bolt weapons, as they do not require charging. A speed reload is often thought to be more or less the opposite of a tactical reload, which retains the old magazine for later use.

== Advantages and disadvantages ==
The main advantage of a speed reload is, as the name implies, speed. If done correctly, it should take less than three seconds, though this may vary slightly according to the firearm being used.

The primary disadvantage of performing a speed reload is that the old magazine is not immediately retained, instead allowed to drop to the ground —though it could be retrieved later. Additionally, it may be louder than a tactical reload, as the ejected magazine is left to fall.

== See also ==
- Glossary of firearms terms
- Tactical reload
- Closed bolt
- Open bolt
