= Kalashnikov rifle =

Russian automatic rifle family

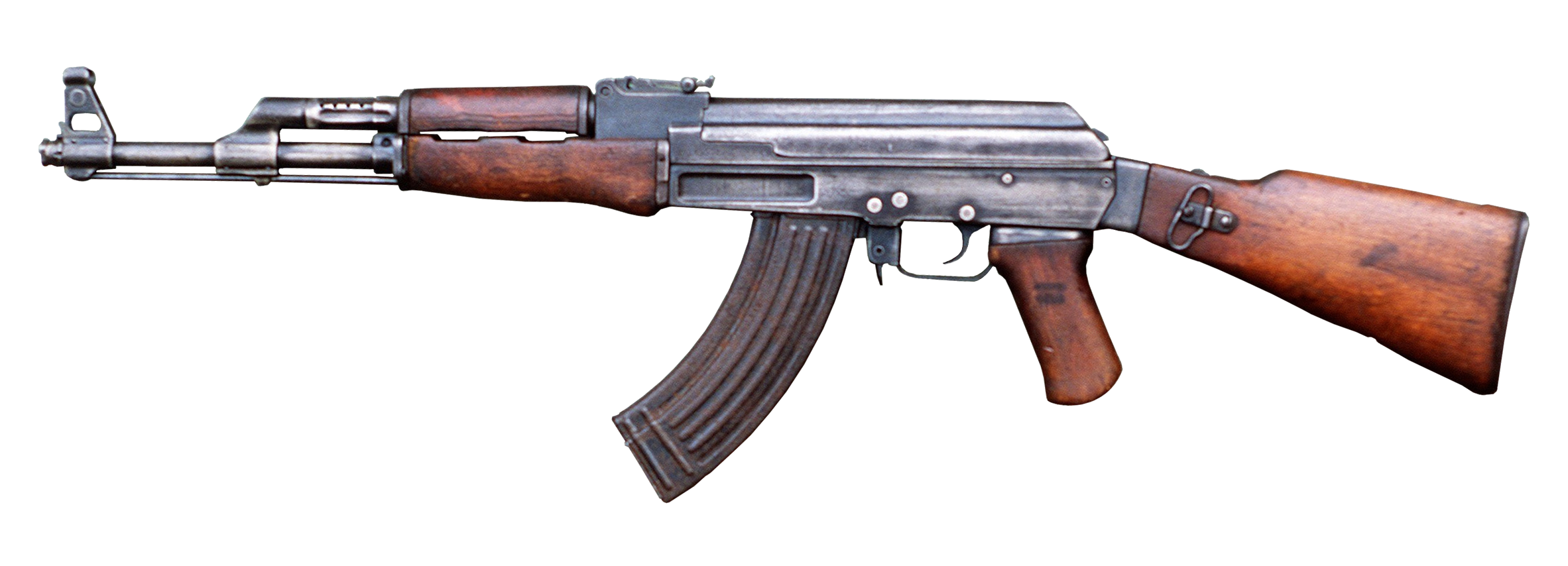
Type 2 AK, mass-produced from 1952 to 1955

The Kalashnikov rifle is a family of assault rifles based on Mikhail Kalashnikov's original design. It is officially known in Russian as avtomat Kalashnikova (Russian: автомат Калашникова, lit. 'Kalashnikov's automatic [rifle]'), and informally as kalash.

== Background ==
AK rifles were originally manufactured in the Soviet Union by Kalashnikov Concern (formerly Izhmash). Rifles similar to the Kalashnikov and its Soviet variants were later produced in many countries friendly to the Soviet Bloc, with rifles based on its design such as the Galil ACE and the INSAS also being produced. The Kalashnikov is one of the most widely used firearms in the world, with an estimated 72 million rifles in global circulation.

== List of AK rifles ==
The original Kalashnikov rifles and their derivatives, as produced in the Soviet Union and later the Russian Federation.

=== Rifles derived directly from the original AK ===
The rifle's simple design makes it easy to produce, and the Soviet Union readily leased plans of the firearm to friendly countries, where it could be produced locally at a low cost. As a result, the Kalashnikov rifles and their variants have been manufactured in many countries, with and without licenses. Manufacturing countries in alphabetical order include:

==== Albania ====
Aside from the ASH-78, the ASH-82, the Albanian AKS-47 copy, was in production.

Several other versions of the AKMS have been produced mainly with short barrels similar to Soviet AKS-74U for special forces, tank and armored crew and for helicopter pilots and police.

There have also been modified ASh-82 (AKMS) with SOPMOD accessories, mainly for Albania's special forces RENEA and exports.

==== Azerbaijan ====
The AK-74M is locally produced under license in Azerbaijan as the Khazri.

==== Bulgaria ====
Model	Description
AKK/AKKS	Type 3 AK-47/w. side-folding buttstock
AKKMS	AKMS
AKKN-47	Fittings for NPSU night sights
AK-47M1	Type 3 with black polymer furniture
AK-47MA1/AR-M1	Same as -M1, but in 5.56×45mm NATO
AKS-74M1	AKMS in 5.56×45mm NATO
AKS-74S	AK-74M1, short version, with East German folding stock, laser aiming device
AKS-74UF	Short version of -M1, Russian folding stock
AR-SF	Same as −74UF, but in 5.56×45mm NATO
AKS-93SM6	Similar to −74M1, cannot use grenade launcher
RKKS	RPK
AKT-74	.22 rimfire training rifle

==== Cuba ====
The AKM is locally produced under license in Cuba.

==== East Germany ====
Model	Description
MPi-K/MPi-KS	AK/AKS
MPi-KM	AKM, wooden and plastic stock
MPi-KMS-72	AKM, side-folding stock
MPi-KMS-K	Carbine
MPi-AK-74N	AK-74
MPi-AKS-74N	AK-74, side-folding stock
MPi-AKS-74NK	AK-74, carbine
KK-MPi Mod.69	.22 LR select-fire trainer

==== Ethiopia ====
The Et-97/1 is a locally manufactured AK-103 variant at the State-run Gafat Armament Engineering Complex.

==== Hungary ====
Model	Description
AK-55	Domestic manufacture of the 2nd Model AK
AKM-63	Also known as AMD-63 in the US; modernized AK-55
AMP-69	Rifle grenade launcher
NGM-81	5.56×45mm NATO; fixed and under-folding stock

==== Iraq ====
Model	Description
Tabuk Assault Rifle	With fixed or underfolding stock, outright clones of Yugoslavian M70 rifles series
Tabuk Short Assault Rifle	Shortened Tabuk Assault Rifle variant

==== Nigeria ====
The Defence Industries Corporation of Nigeria has been producing AK rifles as the OBJ-006.

==== North Korea ====
North Korea has been producing AK rifles as its standard issue weapons.

==== Pakistan ====
Aside from Khyber Pass copies (near the border of Afghanistan), Pakistan has been producing AK rifles as the PK-10.

==== Poland ====
Model	Description
pmK (kbk AK)	The name has changed from pmK (Polish: pistolet maszynowy Kałasznikowa, lit. 'Kalashnikov SMG') to the kbk AK (Polish: karabinek AK, lit. 'Kalashnikov Carbine') in mid-1960s; copies of the AK/AKS
pmKS (kbk AKS)	The name has changed from pmK (Polish: pistolet maszynowy Kałasznikowa, lit. 'Kalashnikov SMG') to the kbk AK (Polish: karabinek AK, lit. 'Kalashnikov Carbine') in mid-1960s; copies of the AK/AKS
kbkg wz. 1960/72	Modernised variant
kbk AKM / kbk AKMS	AKM/AKMS

==== Sudan ====
The MAZ is the Sudanese licensed copy of the Chinese Type 56 made by Military Industry Corporation.

==== Turkey ====
The SAR 15T/308(V2) is a locally produced and modernized version of the AK platform by defense contractor Sarsilmaz (Sarsılmaz Silah Sanayi A.Ş.).

==== United States ====
Model	Manufacturer	Calibre	Reference
PSAK-47 GF3 rifle	Palmetto State Armory	7.62×39mm	
PSAK-47 GF4 rifle	Palmetto State Armory	7.62×39mm	
PSAK-47 GF5 rifle	Palmetto State Armory	7.62×39mm	
Soviet Arms Krink rifle	Palmetto State Armory	5.56x45mm	
PSA AK-556 rifle	Palmetto State Armory	5.56x45mm	
PSAK-74 rifle	Palmetto State Armory	5.45x39mm	
PSA AK Type 56 rifle	Palmetto State Armory	7.62×39mm	
US132 rifle	Kalashnikov USA	7.62×39mm	
US132Z	Kalashnikov USA	7.62×39mm	
US109L	Kalashnikov USA	12 gauge	
US109T	Kalashnikov USA	12 gauge	

==== Vietnam ====
- AKM-1
- AKM-VN (AKM) assault rifle
- TUL-1 (RPK) light machine gun

==== Venezuela ====
The AK-103 is locally manufactured in Venezuela.

=== Similar rifles ===
The following rifles were either based on the Kalashnikov design, or have a different design but are superficially similar in appearance:

== Accessories ==
=== Sights ===
- PSO-1

=== Silencer ===
- PBS-1 silencer

=== Bayonets ===
- 6KH2 bayonet
- 6KH3 bayonet
- 6KH4 bayonet
- 6KH5 bayonet
- 6KH9 bayonet

=== Grenade launcher ===
- GP-25

== Comparative characteristics of AK rifles ==
Name	Country	Type	Cartridge	Length extended/folded (mm)	Barrel length (mm)	Weight (kg) (empty)	Cyclic rate of fire (rounds per minute)	Maximum sighting range (m)	Muzzle velocity (m/s)
AK-47	Soviet Union	Assault rifle	7.62×39mm M43	870	415	3.47	600	800	715
AKM	Soviet Union	Assault rifle	7.62×39mm M43	880	415	3.10	600	1,000	715
RPK(s)	Soviet Union	Light machine gun	7.62×39mm M43	1040/820	590	4.80/5.60	600	1,000	745
AK-74	Soviet Union	Assault rifle	5.45×39mm M74	943	415	3.07	650	1,000	900
AKS-74	Soviet Union	Assault rifle	5.45×39mm M74	933/690	415	2.97	650	1,000	900
AK-74M	Soviet Union	Assault rifle	5.45×39mm M74	943/705	415	3.40	650	1,000	900
RPK-74	Soviet Union	Light machine gun	5.45×39mm M74	1060	590	4.70	600	1,000	960
AKS-74U	Soviet Union	Carbine assault rifle	5.45×39mm M74	730/490	207	2.70	700	500	735
AK-101	Russia	Assault rifle	5.56×45mm NATO	943/700	415	3.60	600	1,000	910
AK-102	Russia	Carbine assault rifle	5.56×45mm NATO	824/586	314	3.00	600	500	850
AK-103	Russia	Assault rifle	7.62×39mm M43	943/705	415	3.40	600	1,000	715
AK-104	Russia	Carbine assault rifle	7.62×39mm M43	824/586	314	3.00	600	500	670
AK-105	Russia	Carbine assault rifle	5.45×39mm M74	824/586	314	3.20	600	500	840
AK-107	Russia	Assault rifle	5.45×39mm M74	943/700	415	3.80	850	1,000	900
AK-108	Russia	Assault rifle	5.56×45mm NATO	943/700	415	3.80	900	1,000	910
AK-109	Russia	Assault rifle	7.62×39mm M43	943/700	415	3.80	900	1,000	750
AK-9	Russia	Assault rifle	9×39mm	705/465	200	3.10/3.80 (with suppressor)	600	400	290 (СП-5) / 305 (СП-6)
AK-12	Russia	Assault rifle	5.45×39mm M74	940/730	415	3.30	700	1,000	900
AK-15	Russia	Assault rifle	7.62×39mm M43	922/862	415	3.50	700	1,000	715
AK-19	Russia	Assault rifle	5.56×45mm NATO	935/725	415	3.35	700	1,000	910
AK-308	Russia	Battle rifle	7.62×51mm NATO	885-945/695	415	4.30	700	760	

== In the United States ==
The Kalashnikov weapon design has become increasingly more popular in the American firearms industry. There are specific competitive shooting matches that require the use of its weapon variants like the Red Oktober match held just outside of St. George, Utah. It is a match designed for the use of ComBloc style weapons, but the Kalashnikov design is extremely heavy within the participants' arsenals.

Due to sanctions to Russia preventing the import of arms, a number of companies started producing clones of the Kalashnikov family of weapons. In particular, the company Kalashnikov USA was created specifically for this purpose. Companies such as Palmetto State Armory and Century Arms also produce Kalashnikov clones.

== See also ==
- AK-100 (rifle family)
