= 6KH4 bayonet =

6Kh4 6Х4
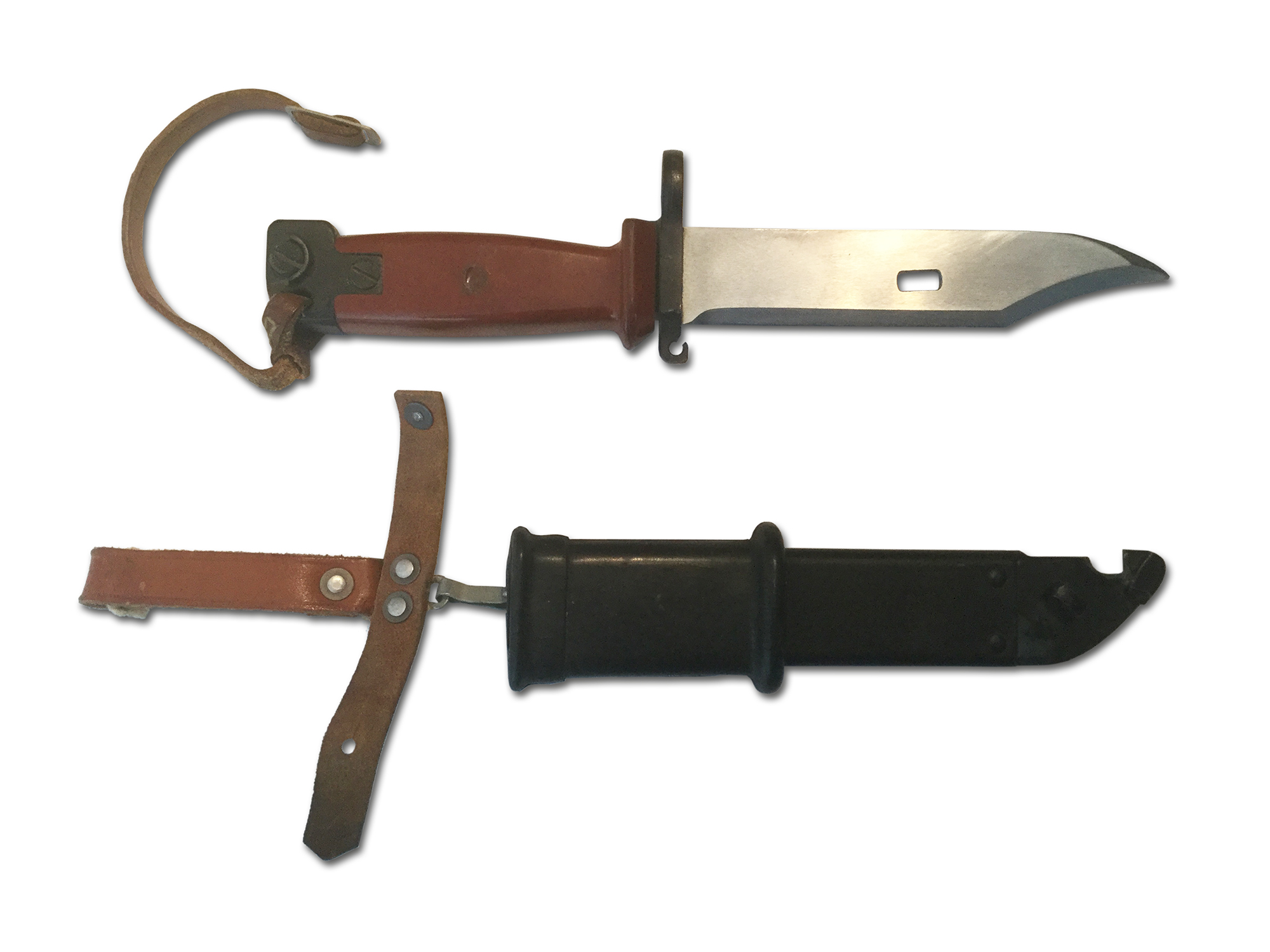
- A 6KH4 bayonet and its shaft.
- Type: Bayonet
- Place of origin: Soviet Union

Service history
- In service: 1965 - present

Production history
- Designer: Izhmash
- Manufacturer: Izhmash; Tula Arsenal

The 6Kh4 bayonet (Russian: Изделие 6Х4, lit. 'Product 6Kh4') is a bayonet produced by the Izhmash for use with AK-74 and AKM type rifles.

== History ==
The 6Kh4 bayonet was introduced and adopted in 1965 as a replacement of the 6Kh3 bayonet.

== Design ==
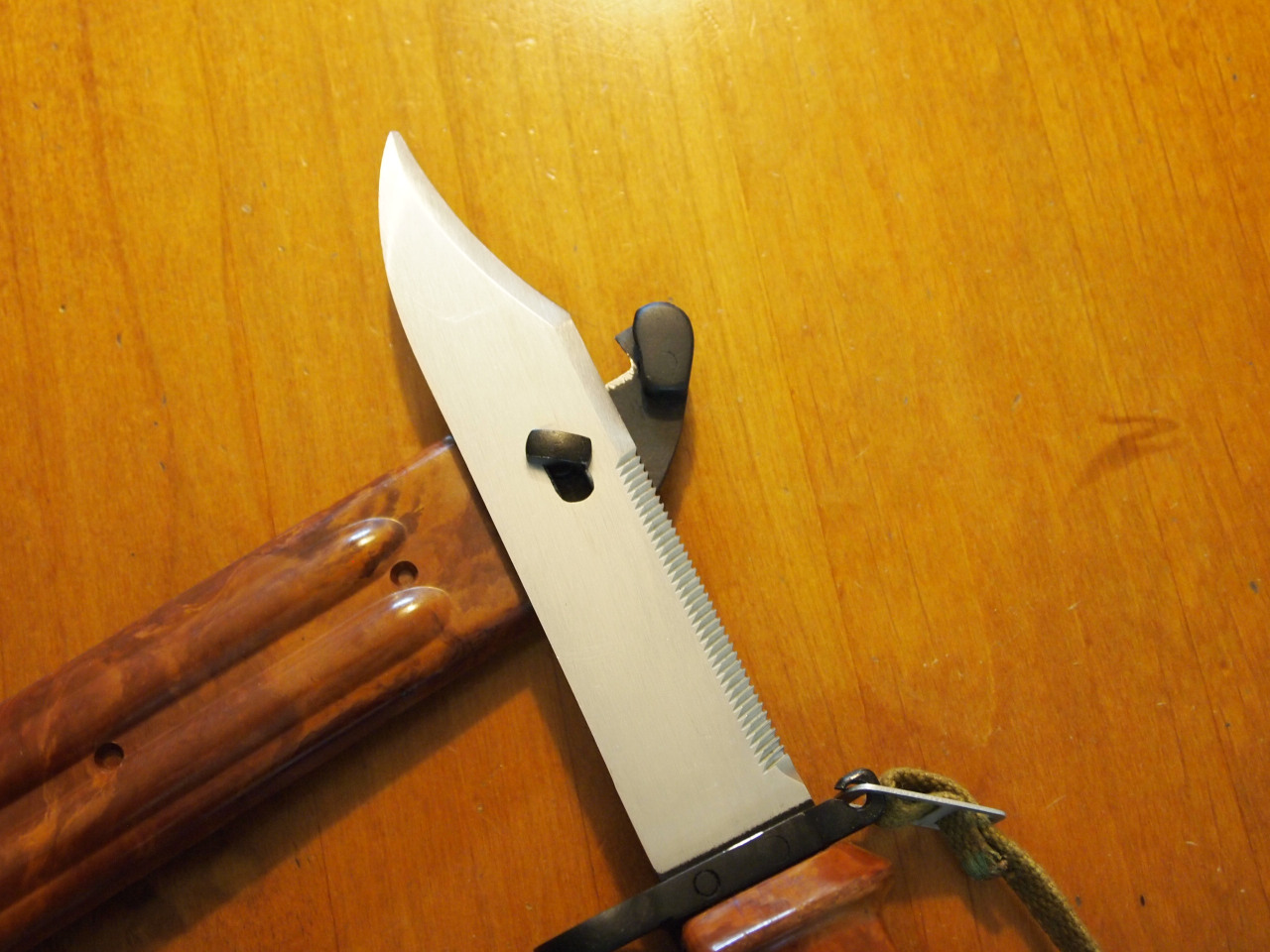
6Kh4 in wire cutting position.

Visually, the blade on the 6Kh4 is similar to that of the 6Kh3.

The handle on the 6Kh4 is a singular part glued to the tang and fixed in-place via a cross pin. The bayonet's scabbard is made out of molded plastic, with a metal end for the wirecutter, which eliminates the need for a rubber insulator.

A fiberglass rod fixes the shank in place, for more reliable fastening of the blade in the handle. A massive steel tip is installed from the back of the handle. Compared to the 6Kh3, the 6Kh4 has better electrical insulation due to the metal blade and handle not directly touching each other. The wire cutting mechanism does not differ from the one on the 6Kh3.

The bayonet is connected to an AK rifle using a mounting stud under the rifle's gas block.

== Production ==
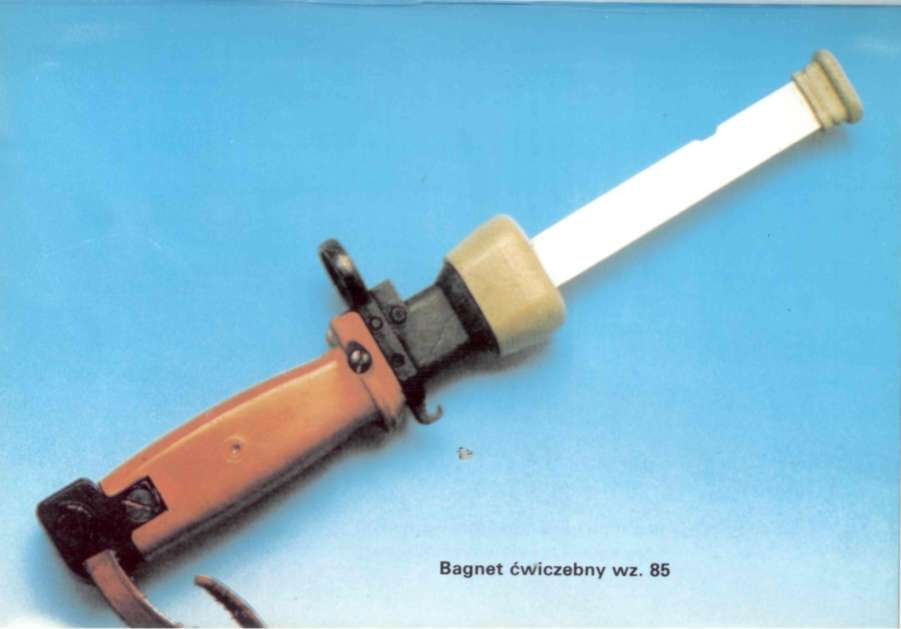
wz. 85 fencing bayonet

The 6Kh4's production began in 1965, with it being intended to be used with AKM rifles. Following the adoption of the AK-74, the bayonet migrated from the AKM to the new rifle delivery set. During the production of the second type in 1972, casting was used instead of metal-cutting, which led to some changes in the design. The fourth type was produced in 1981 by TsNIITochMash, and was issued in small quantities. In 1986, a small batch of type-4 6Kh4 bayonets was produced for commemorative AKM rifles issued to Soviet border guards as awards. Production of the 6Kh4 ceased that same year.

Variants of the 6Kh4 were produced in countries of the Eastern Bloc, such as the Polish People's Republic, Socialist Republic of Romania, German Democratic Republic, and the People's Republic of Bulgaria. The Polish wz. 85 fencing bayonet utilized the 6Kh4 hilt.

== Users ==
- Afghanistan
- Albania
- Algeria
- Angola
- Bangladesh
- Benin
- Cape Verde
- Chad
- Comoros
- Cuba
- Egypt
- Equatorial Guinea
- Grenada
- Guinea
- Guinea-Bissau
- Guyana
- Indonesia
- Iraq
- Laos
- North Korea
- Poland
- People's Republic of China
- Russia
- São Tomé and Príncipe
- Sierra Leone
- Seychelles
- Somalia
- South Yemen
- Sudan
- Sri Lanka
- Tanzania
- Vietnam
- Uganda
- Zimbabwe

=== Former Users ===
- People's Socialist Republic of Albania
- North Vietnam
- Socialist Republic of Romania
- German Democratic Republic
- Soviet Union
- Polish People's Republic
- People's Republic of Bulgaria
- Yugoslavia

== Gallery ==
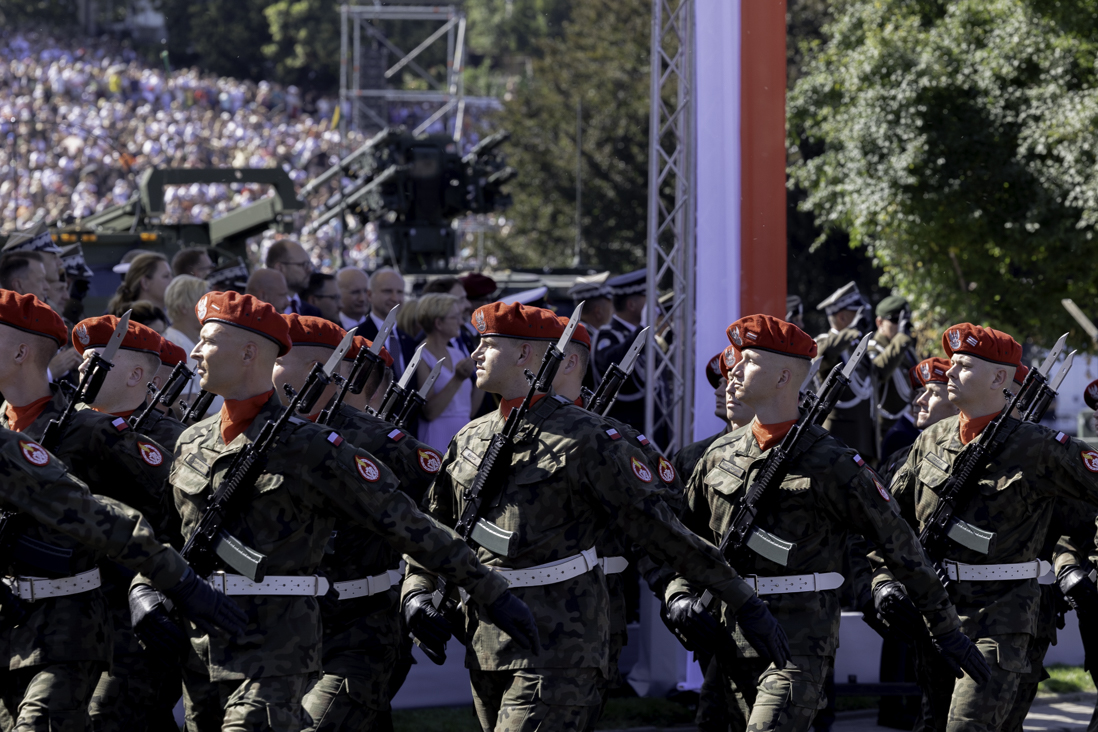
Polish Land Forces troops marching with Beryl rifles, 6Kh4 bayonets installed.

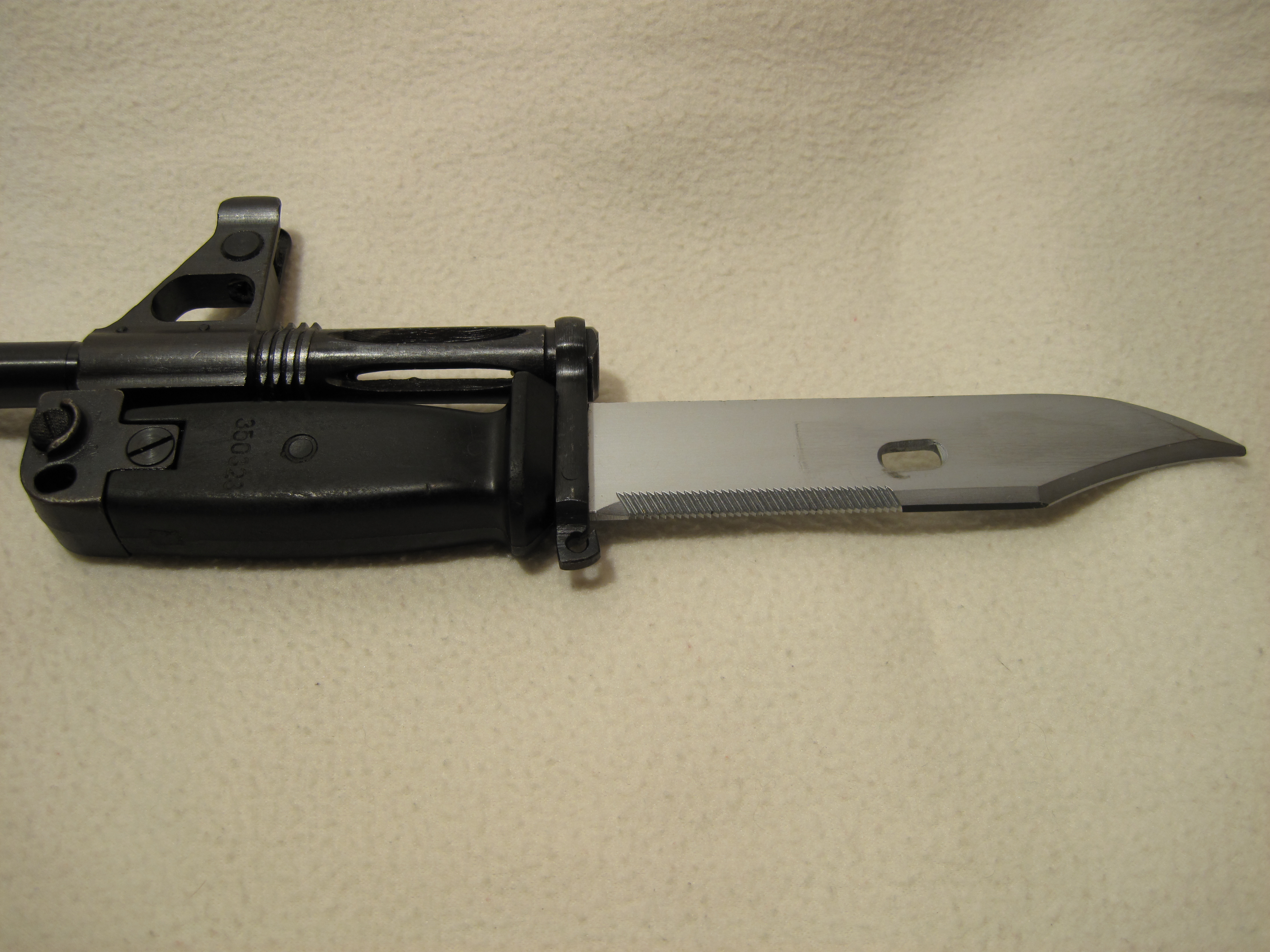
6Kh4 bayonet installed onto a Zastava M76

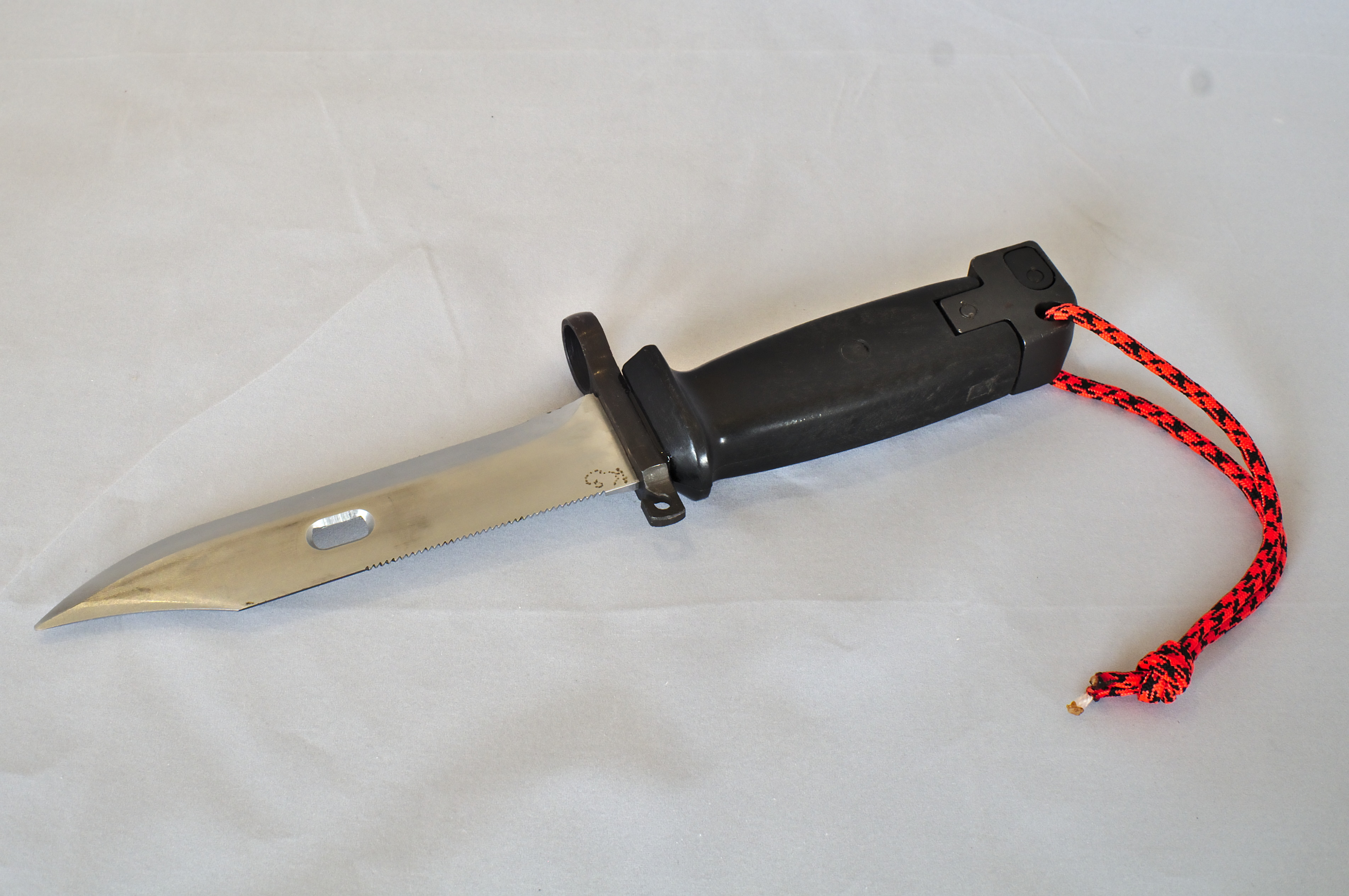
Black-colored 6Kh4 variant

== See also ==
- 6KH2
- 6KH3
- 6KH5
- Bayonet
