= 6KH2 bayonet =

Type of weapon

6KH2 6Х2
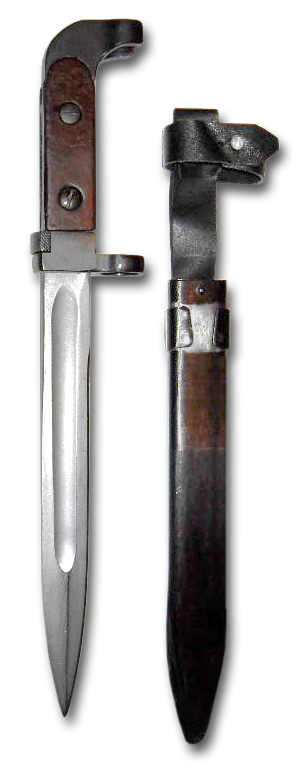
- A 6KH2 bayonet and its shaft
- Type: Bayonet
- Place of origin: Soviet Union

Service history
- In service: 1953—present

Production history
- Designer: Kalashnikov Concern
- Manufacturer: Kalashnikov Concern

The 6KH2 bayonet (Russian: Изделие 6Х2, lit. 'Bayonet 6X2') is a bayonet produced by the Izhmash (now known as the Kalashnikov Concern).

== History ==
The 6KH2 bayonet was adopted alongside the AK-47 rifle in 1953. It was later replaced by the 6KH3 bayonet alongside the AKM rifle.

== Design ==
The 6KH2 bayonet was created as the bayonet for the AK-47 while reusing the design of the M1940 bayonet on the SVT-40.

== Production ==
The Soviet Union allowed license production of the 6KH2 bayonet for Eastern Bloc countries and their AK rifles.

China produced the 6KH2 bayonet under the name of "Type 56 bayonet" (Chinese: 56式可卸式刺刀, lit. 'Type 56 detachable bayonet') for their Type 56 assault rifles.

North Korea copies the 6KH2 bayonet as the "Type 68 I" for their Type 68 assault rifles, but featuring a different pommel mount for it. These bayonets were also issued in Cuba with green scabbards instead of tan scabbards, used in the Korean People's Army.

== Users ==
- Bulgaria
- China
- Cuba
- East Germany
- Hungary
- North Korea
- Poland
- Romania
- Soviet Union
- North Vietnam

== Gallery ==
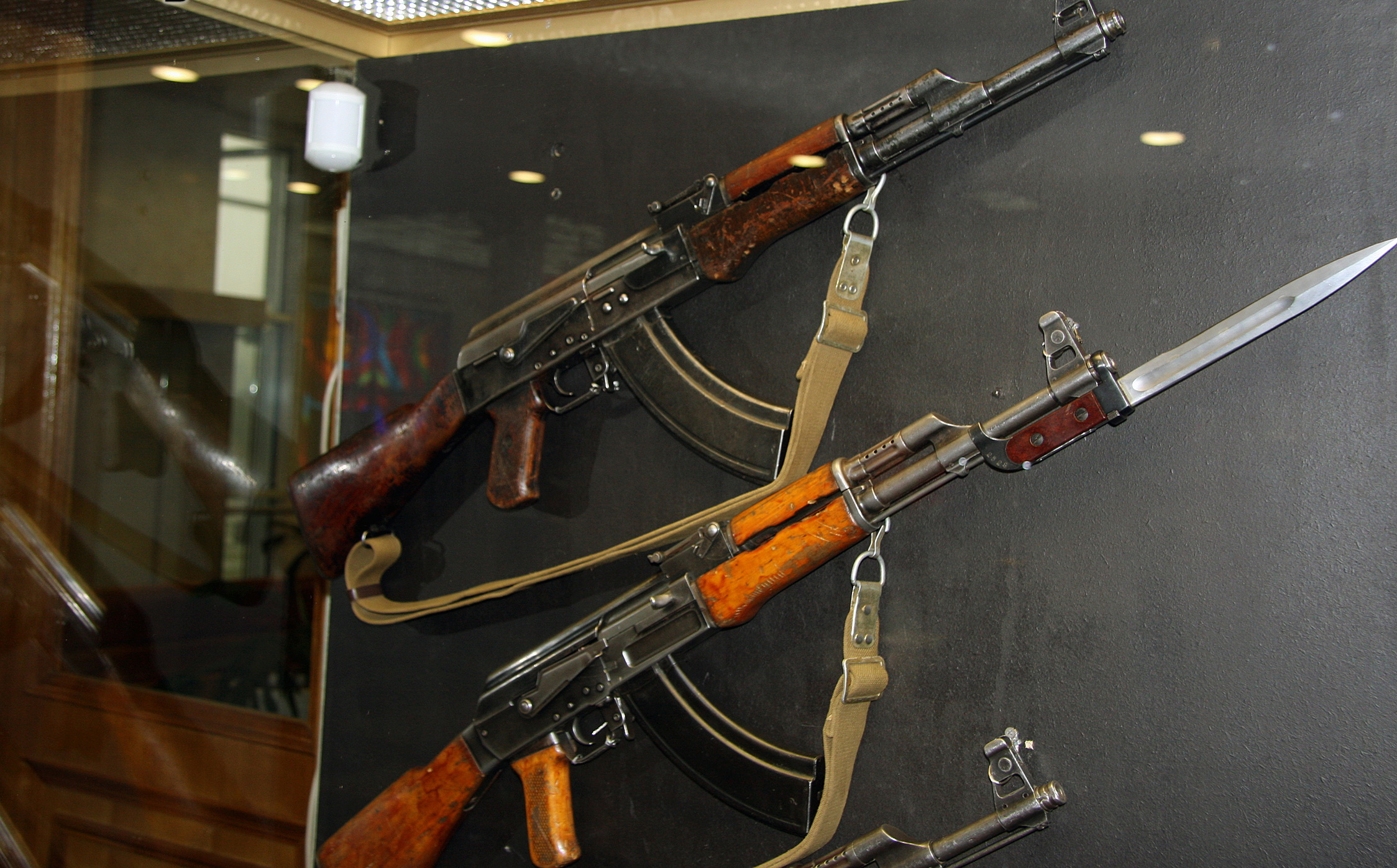
Type 1 and 2 AK rifles on display

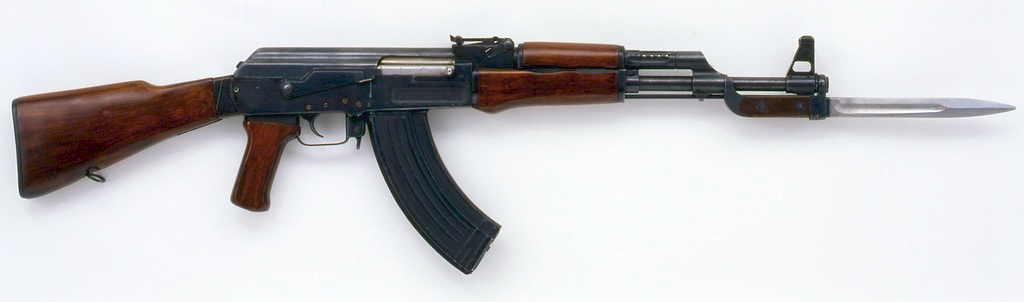
An AK rifle with a 6KH2 bayonet

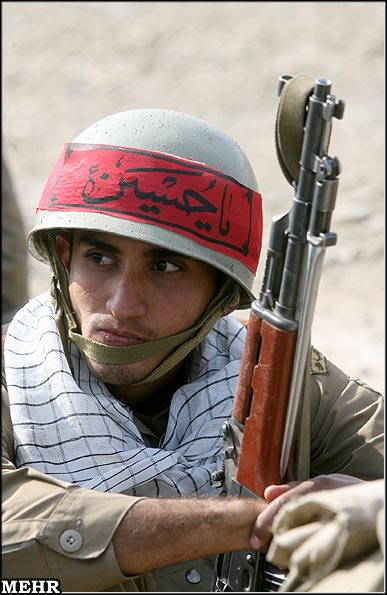
A Chinese Type 56 bayonet affixed to an AK rifle

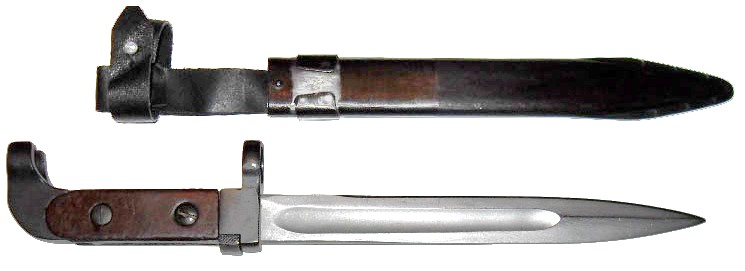
A 6KH2 bayonet

== See also ==
- AK-47
- AKM
- AK-74
- M1 bayonet
- M3 Trench Knife
- M4 Bayonet
- M5 Bayonet
- M6 Bayonet
- M7 bayonet
- M9 bayonet
- Mk 3 knife
- Strider SMF
- Aircrew Survival Egress Knife
- OKC-3S Bayonet
- KA-BAR
- QNL-95
- 6KH3 bayonet
- 6KH4 bayonet
- 6KH5 bayonet
- 6KH9 bayonet
