= 6KH3 bayonet =

6Kh3 6Х3
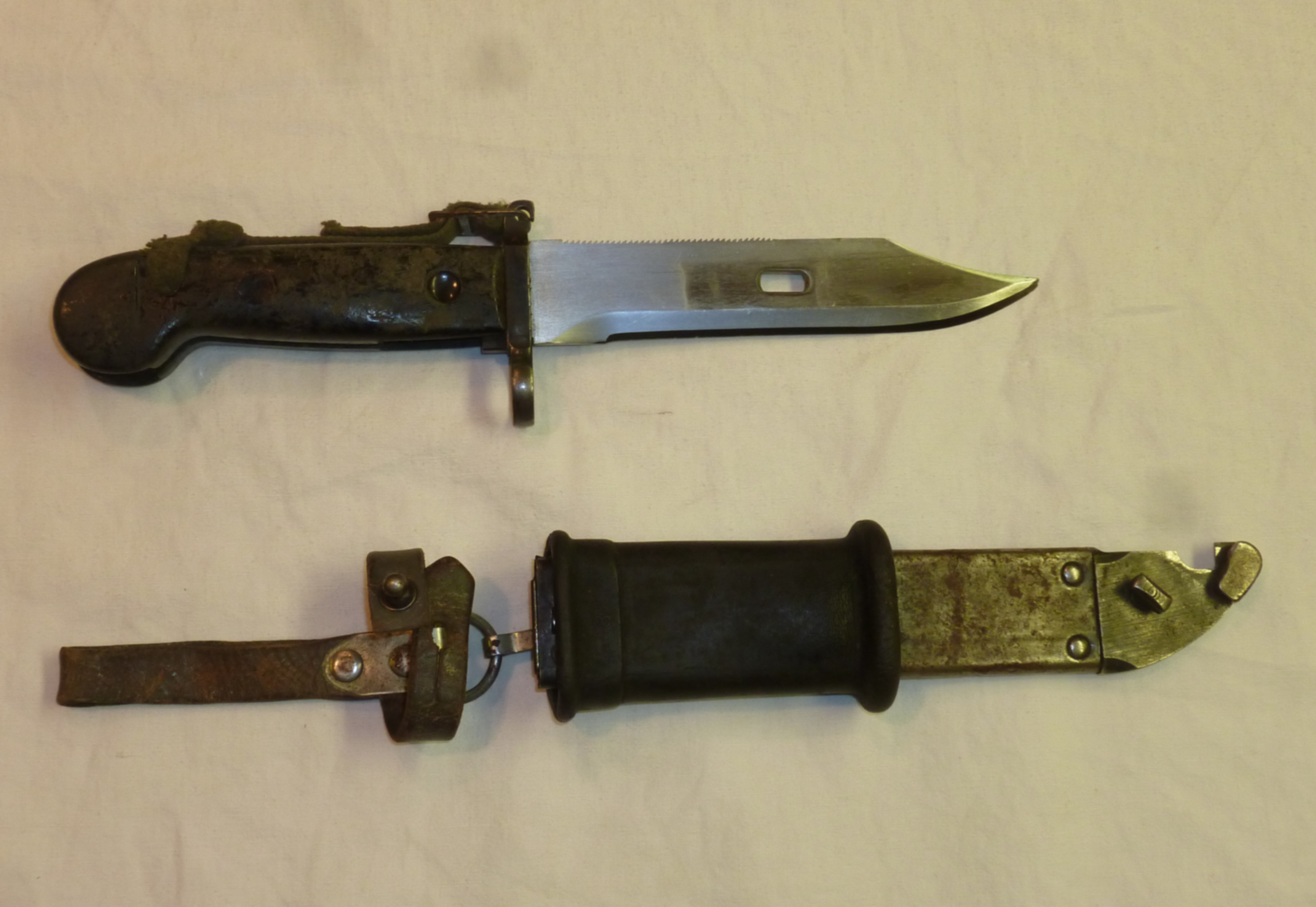
- A 1959-version 6Kh3 bayonet and its shaft
- Type: Bayonet
- Place of origin: Soviet Union

Service history
- In service: 1959 - present

Production history
- Designer: Izhmash
- Manufacturer: Izhmash; Tula Arsenal

The 6Kh3 bayonet (Russian: Изделие 6Х3, lit. 'Article 6X3') is a bayonet produced by Izhmash (now known as the Kalashnikov Concern).

== History ==
The 6KH3 bayonet was adopted alongside the AKM rifle in 1959 as a replacement of the 6KH2 bayonet. It was replaced by the 6KH4 bayonet when the AK-74 rifle entered service.

== Design ==
The 6KH3 bayonet was an improvement of the original design.

The 6KH3 bayonet has a Bowie style (clip-point) blade with saw-teeth along the spine, and can be used as a multi-purpose survival knife and wire-cutter when combined with its steel scabbard.

The polymer grip and upper part of the 6KH3 scabbard provide insulation from the metal blade and bottom part of the metal scabbard, using a rubber insulator sleeve, to safely cut electrified wire.

The bayonet is installed by slipping the muzzle ring around the flash hider and latching the handle down on the bayonet lug under the front sight base.

== Production ==
The Soviet Union allowed license production of the 6KH3 bayonet for Eastern Bloc countries and their AK rifles.

The Polish version notably excluded the saw teeth on the blade.

== Users ==
- Bulgaria
- East Germany
- Hungary
- Poland
- Romania
- Soviet Union

== Gallery ==
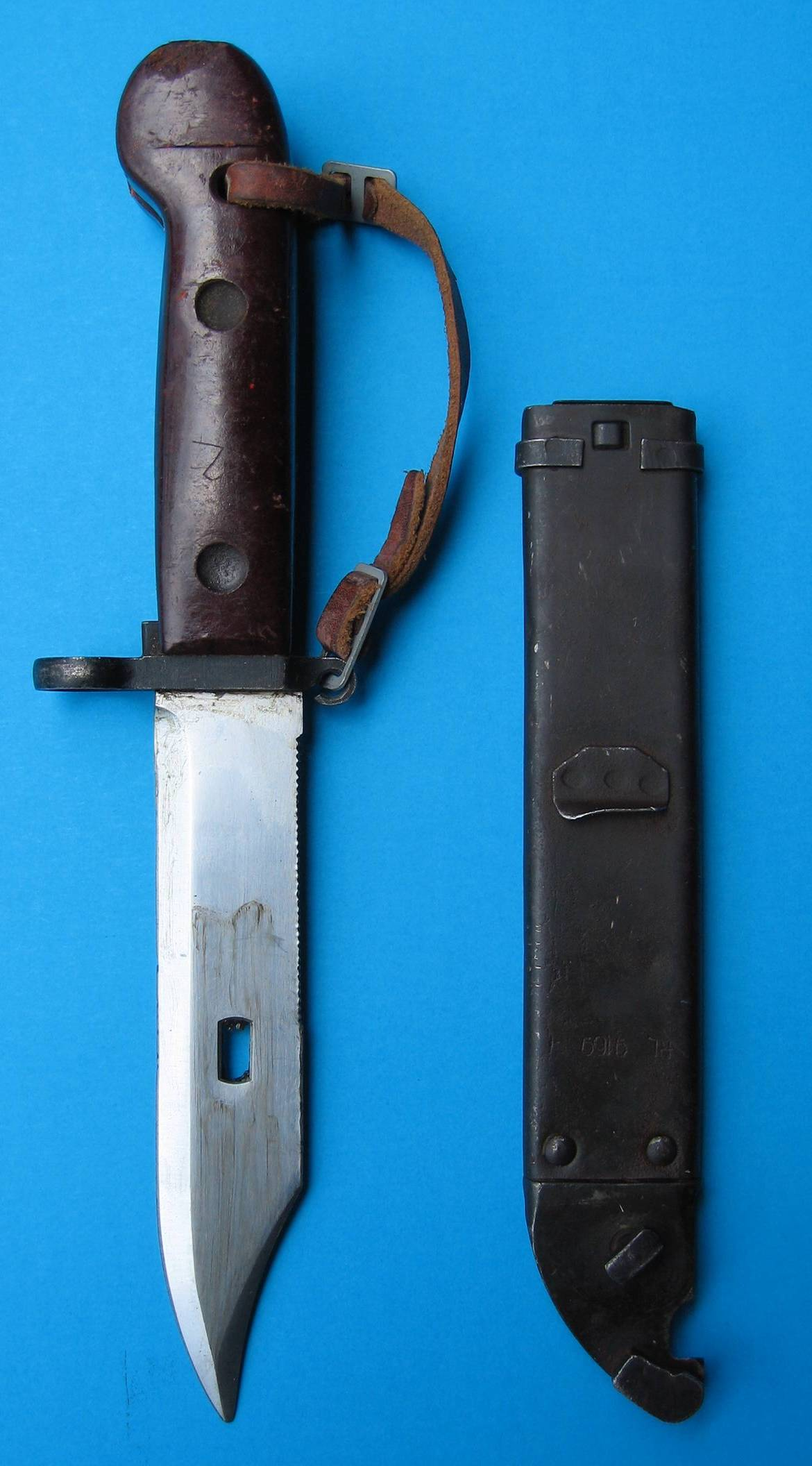
1959 version of the 6KH3 bayonet acquired in 2003 invasion of Iraq and its shaft

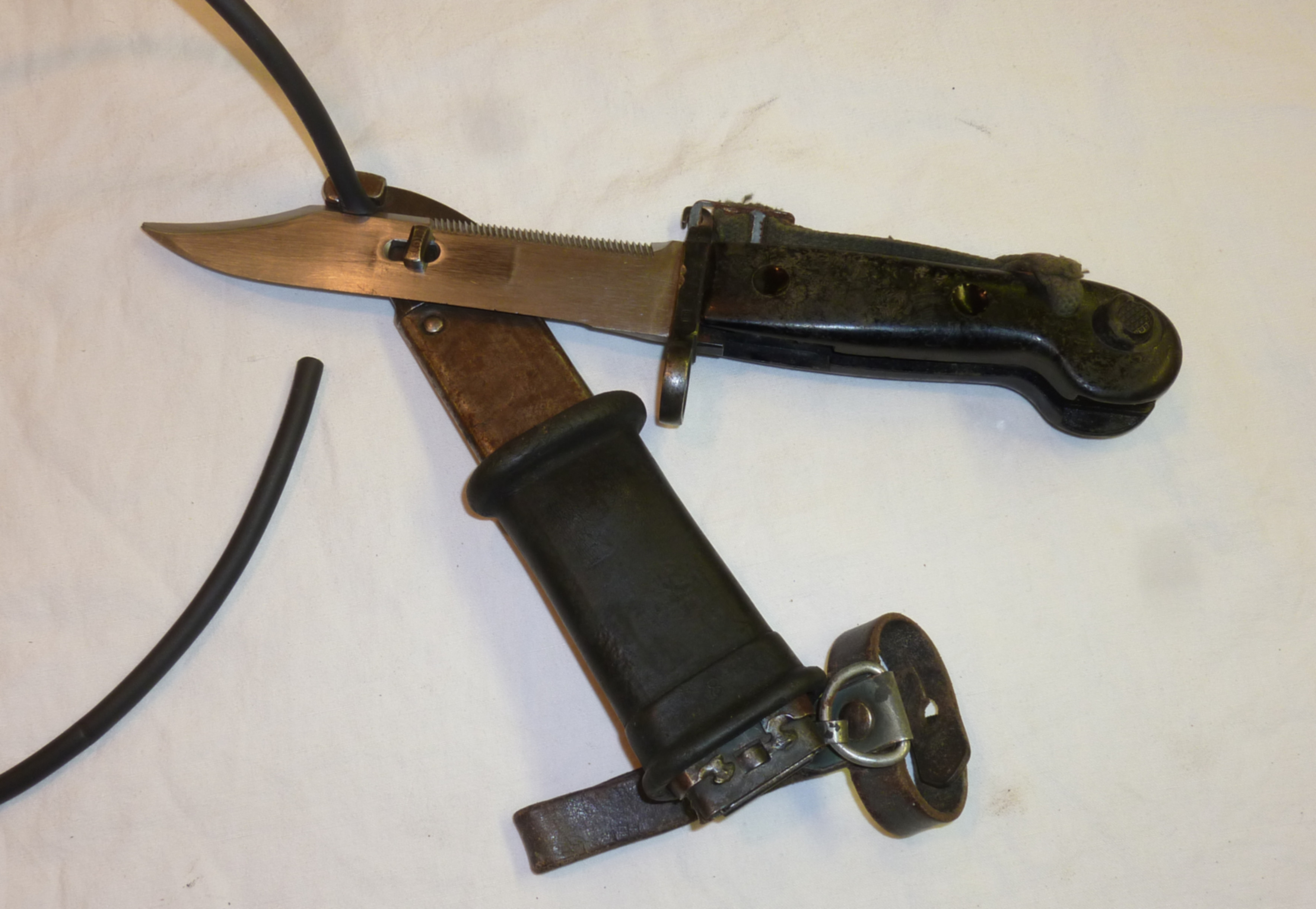
Former AKM bayonet from the NVA

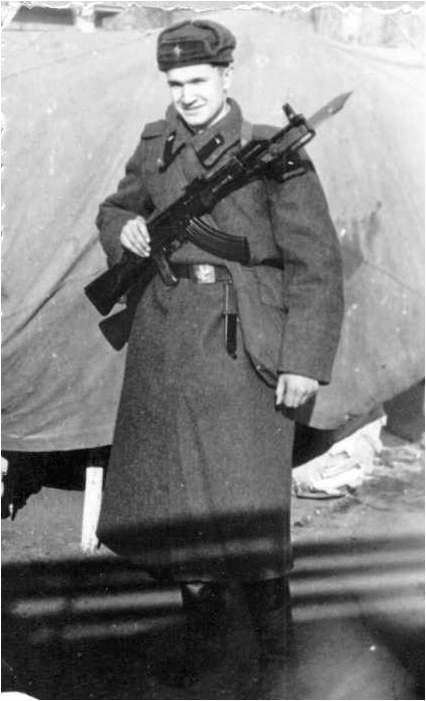
A Soviet infantry soldier with an AKM fitted with a 6KH3 bayonet.

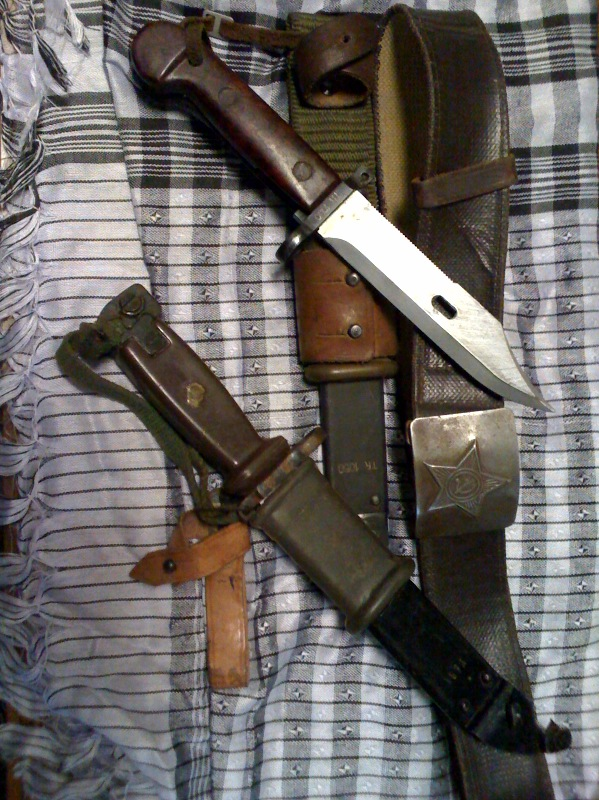
A 6KH3 bayonet and a 6KH4 bayonet

== See also ==
- AK-47
- AKM
- AK-74
- M1 bayonet
- M3 Trench Knife
- M4 Bayonet
- M5 Bayonet
- M6 Bayonet
- M7 bayonet
- M9 bayonet
- Mk 3 knife
- Strider SMF
- Aircrew Survival Egress Knife
- OKC-3S Bayonet
- KA-BAR
- QNL-95
- 6KH2 bayonet
- 6KH4 bayonet
- 6KH5 bayonet
- 6KH9 bayonet
