= Glock =

Brand of polymer-framed semi-automatic pistols

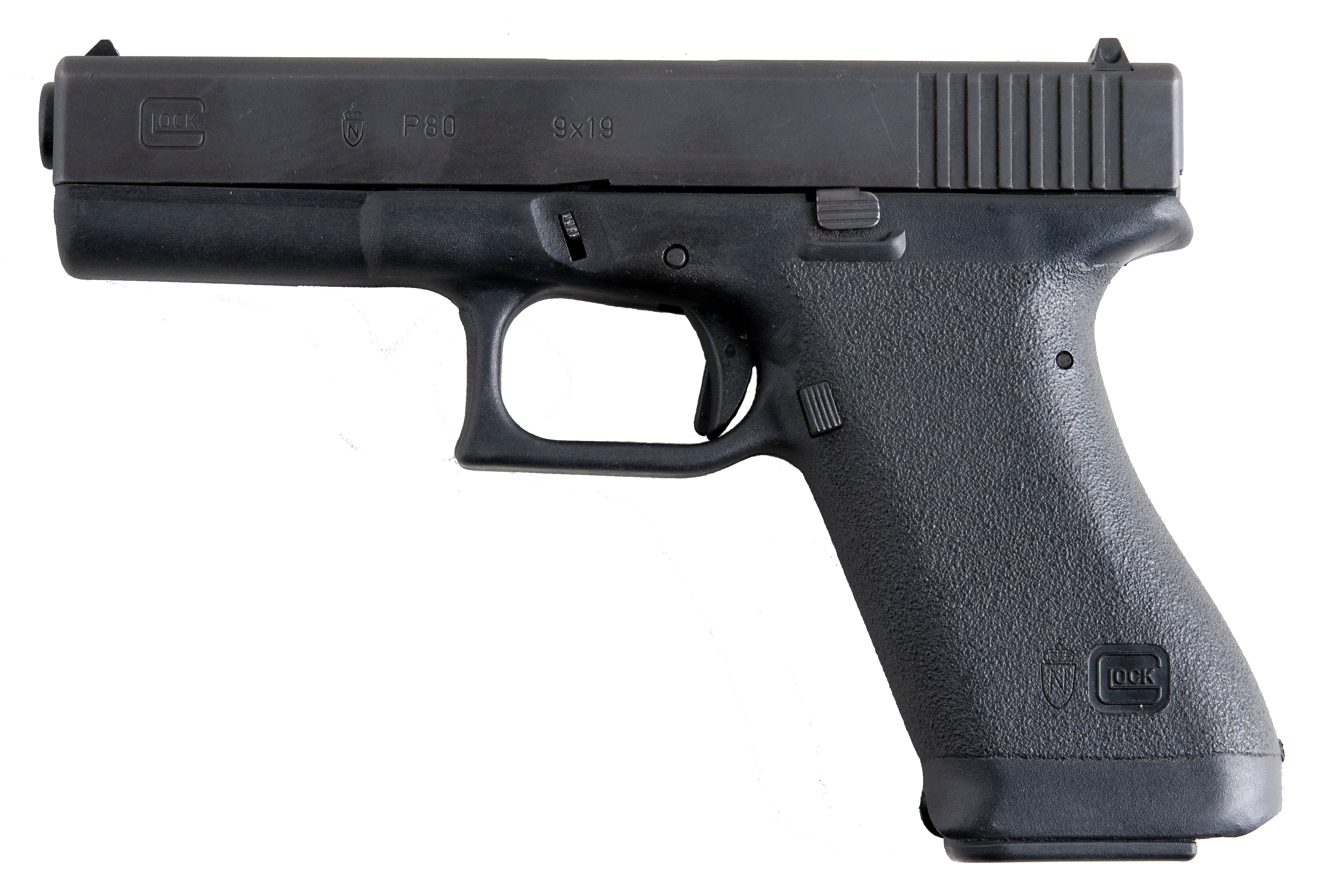
- A first-generation Glock 17 adopted by the Norwegian Armed Forces under the P80 designation
- Type: Semi-automatic pistol; Machine pistol (Glock 18)
- Place of origin: Austria

Service history
- In service: 1982–present
- Used by: See Users

Production history
- Designer: Gaston Glock
- Designed: 1979–1982
- Manufacturer: Glock GmbH
- Produced: 1982–present
- No. built: 20,000,000 as of 2020
- Variants: See Variants

Specifications
- Cartridge: 9×19mm Parabellum; 10mm Auto; .22 LR; .357 SIG; .380 ACP; .40 S&W; .45 ACP; .45 GAP
- Action: Short recoil, locked breech, tilting barrel (straight blowback for Glock 25, 28, and 44)
- Feed system: 6-, 10-, 13-, 15-, 17-, 19-, 24-, 25-, 31-, 33-, or 40-round detachable box magazine, or 50- or 100-round detachable drum magazine
- Sights: Iron sights

Glock (German: [ˈglɔk]; stylized in all caps as GLOCK) is a brand of polymer-framed, short-recoil-operated, locked-breech semi-automatic pistols (as well as some rifles and one machine pistol) designed and produced by Austrian manufacturer Glock GmbH. The firearm, designed by company founder Gaston Glock (1929–2023), entered Austrian military and police service in 1982 as the P80 (later known commercially as the Glock 17) after outperforming established competitors in reliability and safety tests. Despite initial market resistance due to its "plastic" construction, the Glock became the first commercially successful line of pistols with a polymer frame.

The weapon uses the company's proprietary "Safe Action" system, which consists of three independent internal safety mechanisms: the trigger safety, the firing pin safety, and the drop safety. These mechanisms prevent accidental discharge without an external on-off switch. The pistols are also noted for their high magazine capacity relative to their weight and their resistance to corrosion, originally achieved through a ferritic nitrocarburizing surface treatment known as Tenifer.

Glock pistols have become the company's most profitable line of products. They are supplied to national armed forces, security agencies, and police forces in at least 48 countries, including the Federal Bureau of Investigation (FBI) and the majority of police agencies in the United States. The product line has evolved through six generations of design changes ("Gen 1" through "Gen 6"). It is available in a wide variety of calibers, including 9×19mm Parabellum, .40 S&W, 10mm Auto, and .45 ACP, as well as various sizes ranging from the full-sized Glock 17 to the subcompact Glock 26 and "slimline" Glock 43.

The widespread adoption of the design has made the Glock rise in popularity and a subject of gun control debates. In the 2020s, the pistols faced scrutiny regarding the proliferation of "Glock switches," illegal aftermarket auto sears that convert the firearms into machine pistols. This led to lawsuits filed by the states of Minnesota and New Jersey in 2024, and legislation in California in 2025 (Assembly Bill 1127), aimed at forcing design changes to prevent such conversions. In October 2025, Glock announced a major "right-sizing" initiative, ceasing production of over thirty variants to streamline manufacturing and introduce redesigned components to mitigate full-auto conversion.

== History ==
The company's founder and head engineer, Gaston Glock (1929–2023), had no experience in firearms design or manufacture when his first pistol, the Glock 17, was being prototyped. Glock had extensive experience in advanced synthetic polymers, which was instrumental in the company's design of the first commercially successful line of pistols with a polymer frame. Glock introduced ferritic nitrocarburizing into the firearms industry as an anticorrosion surface treatment for metal gun parts.

=== Development ===
In 1980, the Austrian Armed Forces announced that it would seek tenders for a new, modern duty pistol to replace their World War II–era Walther P38 handguns. The Federal Ministry of Defence of Austria formulated a list of 17 criteria for the new generation service pistol, including requirements that it would be self loading; fire the NATO-standard 9×19mm Parabellum round; the magazines would not require any means of assistance for loading; not be subject to accidental discharge from shock, strike, and drop from a height of 2 m (6 ft 7 in) onto a steel plate. After firing 15,000 rounds of standard ammunition, the pistol was to be inspected for wear. The pistol was to be then used to fire an overpressure test cartridge generating 5,000 bar (500 MPa; 73,000 psi). The normal maximum operating pressure (P_{max}) for the 9 mm NATO is 2,520 bar (252 MPa; 36,500 psi).

Glock became aware of the Austrian Army's planned procurement, and in 1982, assembled a team of Europe's leading handgun experts from military, police, and civilian sport-shooting circles to define the most desirable characteristics in a combat pistol. Within three months, Glock had developed a working prototype that combined proven mechanisms and traits from previous pistol designs. In addition, the plan was to make extensive use of synthetic materials and modern manufacturing technologies, which led to the Glock 17 becoming a cost-effective candidate.

Several samples of the Glock 17 (so named corresponding to its magazine capacity or because it was the 17th patent procured by the company) were submitted for assessment trials in early 1982. After passing all of the exhaustive endurance and abuse tests, the Glock emerged as the winner. According to Friedrich Dechant, former head of the Austrian Armaments and Defence Technology Agency, the Glock P80 was clearly superior to other handguns in terms of performance, handling, charging capacity and price.

The handgun was adopted into service with the Austrian military and law enforcement in 1982 as the Pistole 80 (P80), with an initial order for 25,000 guns. The Glock 17 outperformed eight different pistols from five other established manufacturers (Heckler & Koch of Germany offered their P7M8, P7M13, and P9S, SIG Sauer of Switzerland bid with their P220 and P226 models, Beretta of Italy submitted their model 92SB-F, FN Herstal of Belgium proposed an updated variant of the Browning Hi-Power, and the Austrian Steyr Mannlicher entered the competition with the GB).

The results of the Austrian trials sparked a wave of interest in Western Europe and overseas, particularly in the United States, where a similar effort to select a service-wide replacement for the M1911 had been going on since the late 1970s (known as the Joint Service Small Arms Program). In late 1983, the United States Department of Defense inquired about the Glock pistol and received four samples of the Glock 17 for unofficial evaluation. Glock was then invited to participate in the XM9 Personal Defense Pistol Trials, but declined because the DOD specifications would require extensive retooling of production equipment and providing 35 test samples in an unrealistic time frame.

In 1985, after joint Norwegian and Swedish trials from 1983 to 1985, the Glock 17 was accepted into service as the P80 in Norway and, in 1988, as the Pistol 88 in Sweden, where it surpassed all prior NATO durability standards. As a result, the Glock 17 became a standard NATO-classified sidearm and was granted a NATO Stock Number (1005-25-133-6775). By 1992, some 350,000 pistols had been sold in more than 45 countries, including 250,000 in the United States alone.

Starting in 2013, the British Armed Forces began replacing the Browning Hi-Power pistol with the Glock 17 Gen 4, due to concerns about weight and the external safety of the Hi-Power. The British preferred the Glock 17 Gen 4 over the Beretta Px4 Storm, FN FNP, Heckler & Koch P30, SIG Sauer P226, Smith & Wesson M&P, and Steyr M9A1 of which 19 pistols each, all chambered in 9×19 mm Parabellum, were entered in the R9GSP trials.

The French Armed Forces (FAF) in 2020 began replacing their MAC Mle 1950 and, to a lesser extent, their PAMAS G1 pistols with Glock 17 Gen 5 models specifically made for the FAF. The French preferred the Glock 17 Gen 5 over the HS2000 and CZ P-10 offerings that also made it to the final selection phase.

=== Product evolution ===
Glock has updated its basic design several times throughout its production history.

==== First-generation models ====
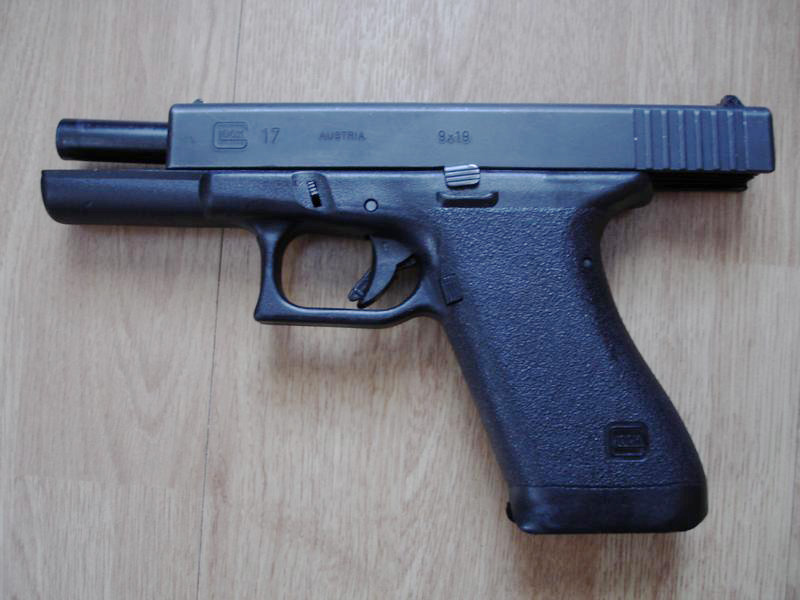
A "first-generation" Glock 17 with the slide locked back, displaying its upward barrel tilt

The first-generation (Gen 1) Glock pistols are most notably recognized by their smoother "pebble finish" grip and frame with no finger grooves. The Gen 1 frame pattern and design was used by Glock from 1982 through 1988 and pre-dates the checkered grip patterns used in the second generation of Glock pistols. The first Glock 17s imported to the US were serialized with an alphanumeric (two-letter prefix followed by three numbers) stamped into the slide, barrel, and a small metal plate inserted into the bottom side of the polymer frame. The first documented Glock 17s (by serial number) imported into the US were from the AF000 series in January 1986, followed by AH000, AK000, and AL000. These early Glock (Gen 1) pistols (serial number prefix AF through AM) were also manufactured with a barrel that had a smaller overall diameter and thinner bore walls, later known as "pencil barrels". The barrels were later redesigned with thicker bore walls, and manufacturing continued to evolve, improving the design of Glock pistols.

Many of the first-generation Glocks were shipped and sold in the iconic "Tupperware" style plastic boxes. The earliest Glock boxes had ammunition storage compartments that allowed for 17 rounds of 9mm to be stored with the pistol. Glock later changed this box design to meet BATF import requirements, and removed the ammunition storage compartments.

==== Second-generation models ====
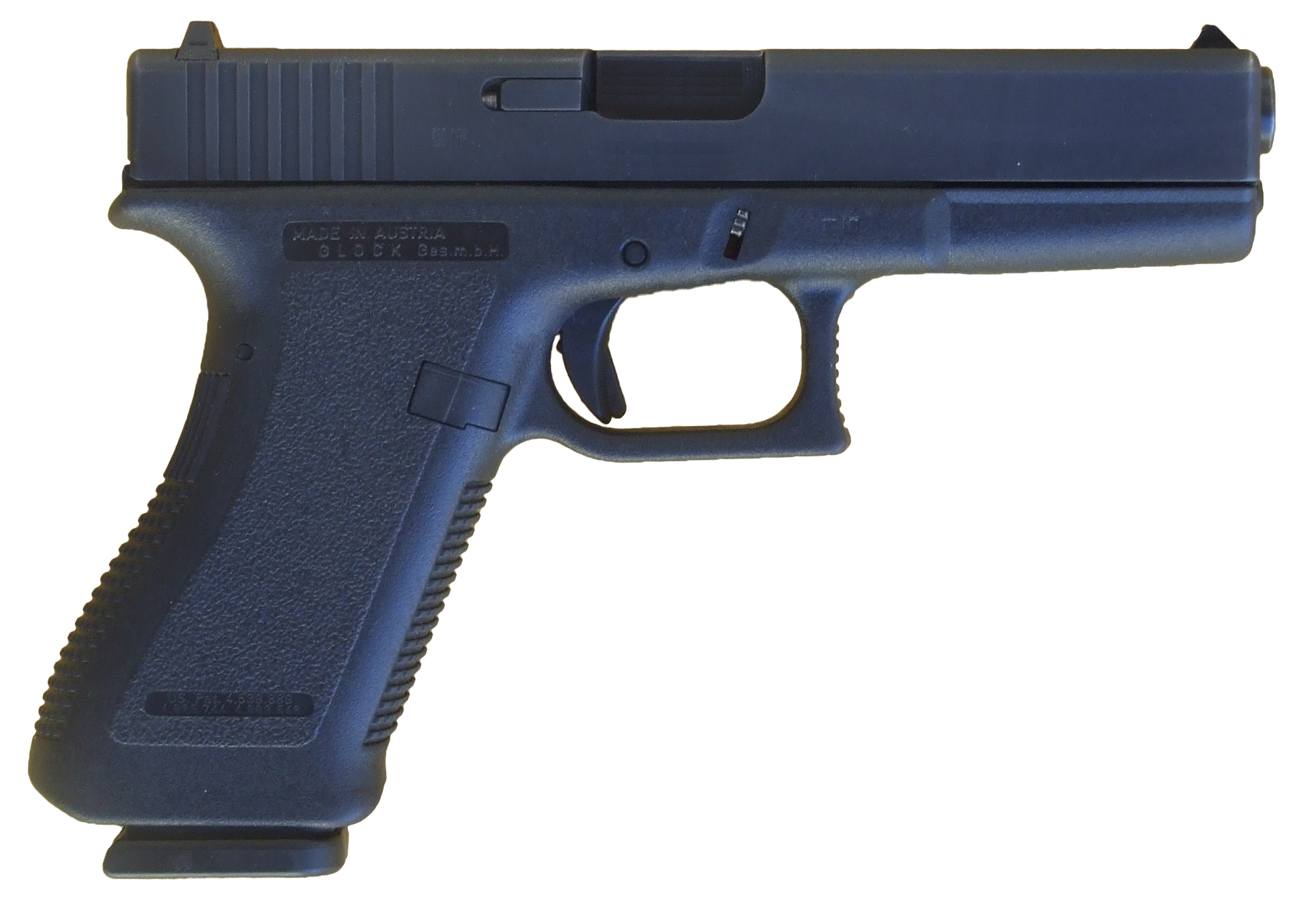
A "second-generation" Glock 17, identified by the checkering on the front and rear straps of the pistol grip and trigger guard

A mid-life upgrade to the Glock pistols involved adding checkering to the front strap and trigger guard, and adding checkering and serrations to the back strap. These versions, introduced in 1988, were informally referred to as "second-generation" or Gen2 models. However, Glock did not mark the pistols Gen2. In 1991, an integrated recoil spring assembly replaced the original two-piece recoil spring and tube design. The magazine was slightly modified, changing the floorplate and fitting the follower spring with a resistance insert at its base.

==== Third-generation models ====
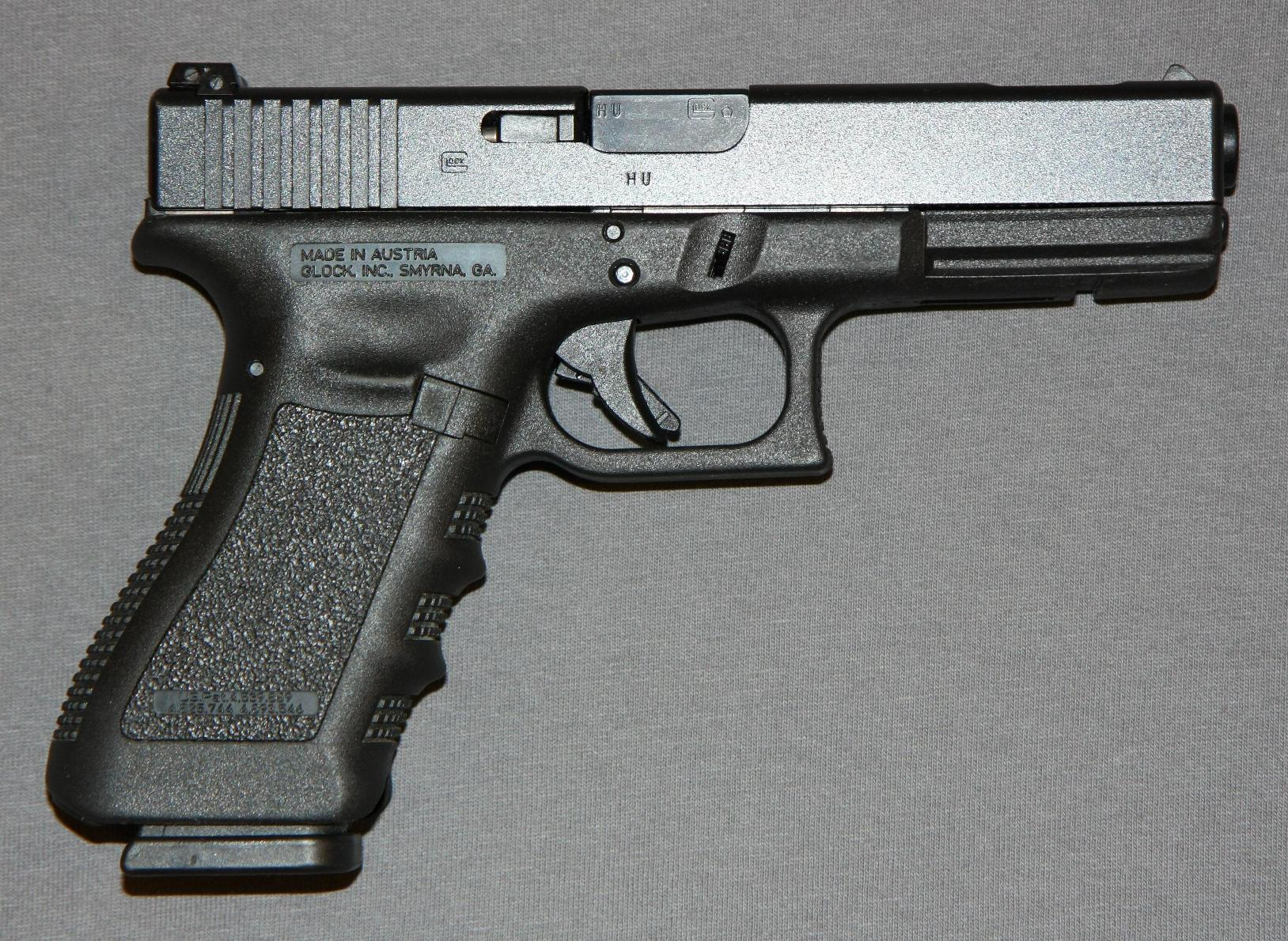
A "third-generation" Glock 17C, identified by the addition of an extra cross pin above the trigger, finger grooves, a reshaped extractor that serves as a loaded chamber indicator, and an accessory rail

In 1998, the frame was further modified with an accessory rail (called the "Universal Glock rail") similar to a Picatinny rail to allow the mounting of laser sights, tactical lights, and other accessories. Thumb rests on both sides of the frame, and finger grooves were added to the front strap. Glock pistols with these upgrades are informally referred to as (early) "third-generation" models. Later third-generation models additionally featured a modified extractor that serves as a loaded chamber indicator, and the locking block was enlarged, along with the addition of an extra cross pin to aid the distribution of bolt thrust forces exerted by the locking block. This cross pin is known as the locking block pin and is located above the trigger pin.

The polymer frames of third-generation models can be black, flat dark earth, or olive drab. Besides that, non-firing dummy pistols ("P" models) and non-firing dummy pistols with resetting triggers ("R" models) have a bright red frame, and Simunition-adapted practice pistols ("T" models) a bright blue frame for easy identification.

In 2009, the Glock 22 RTF2 (Rough Textured Frame 2) (chambered in .40 S&W) was introduced. This pistol featured new checkering on the grip and new scalloped (fish-gill-shaped) serrations on the sides of the slide. Many of the existing models became available in the RTF2 version, including the 17, 31, 32, 23, 21, and 19. Some of those did not have the fish gills.

==== Fourth-generation models ====
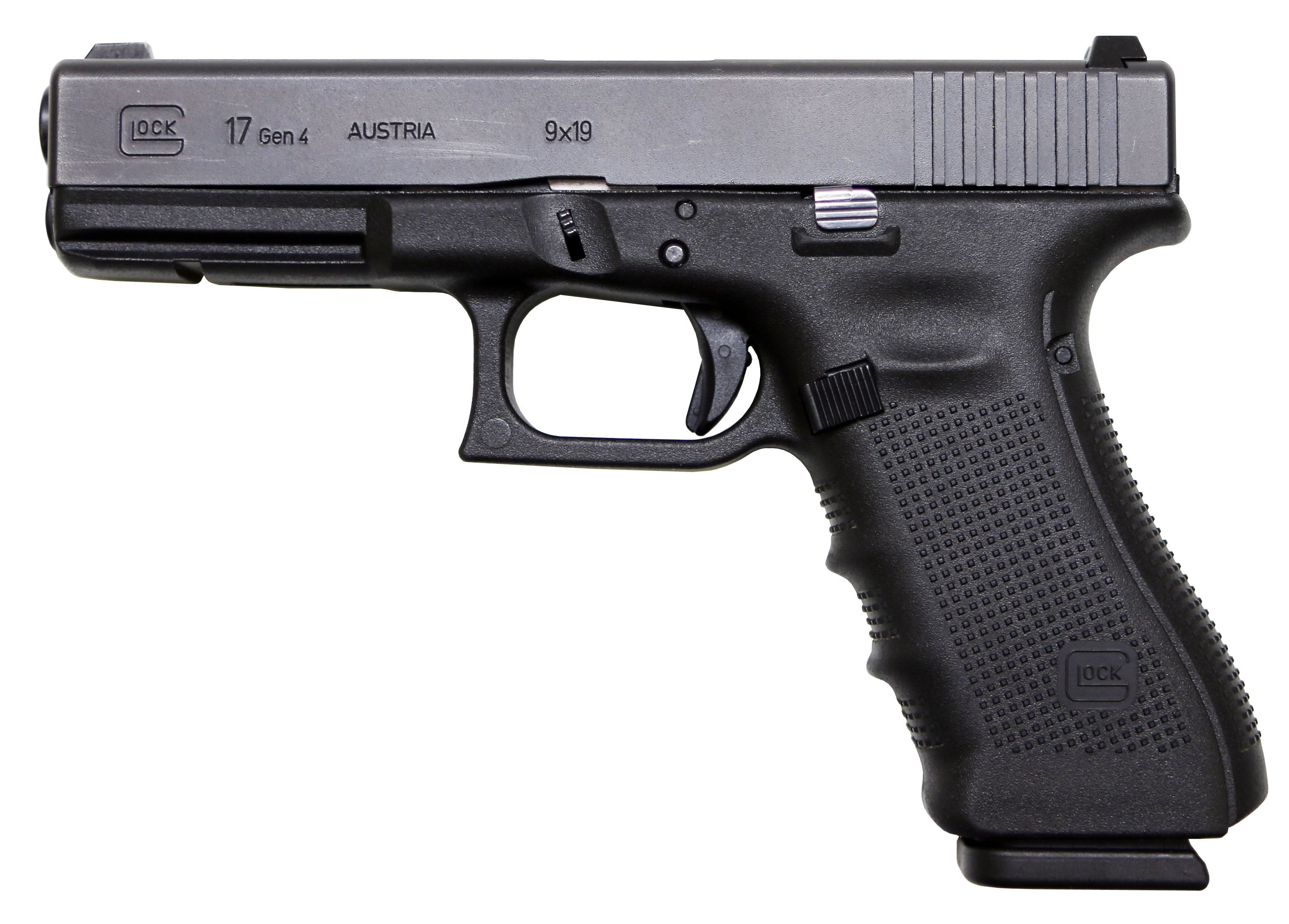
A "fourth-generation" Glock 17, identified by an enlarged and reversible magazine release catch, modified rough texture frame grip checkering, interchangeable backstraps, and a "Gen4" rollmark on the slide

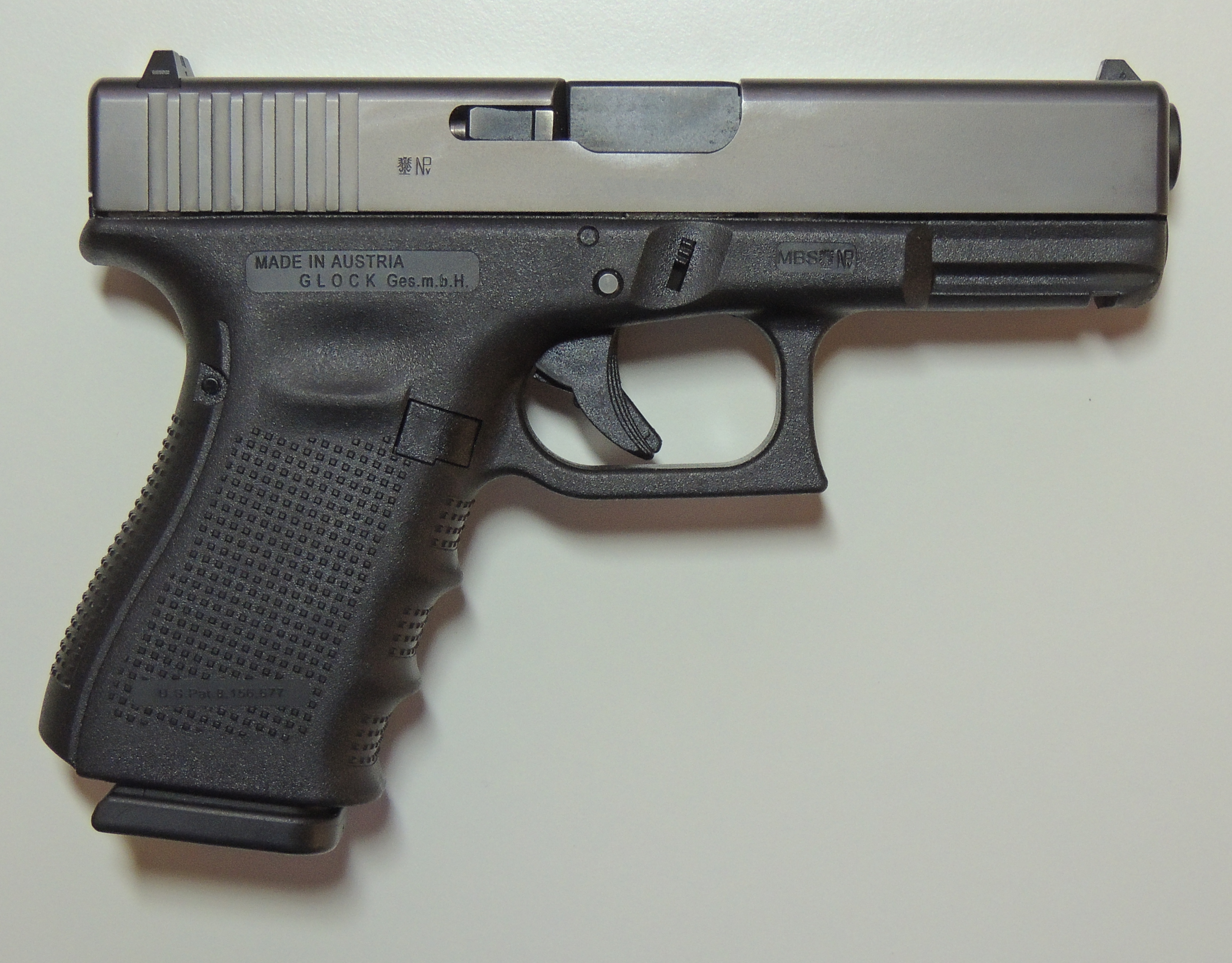
A "fourth-generation" Glock 19

At the 2010 SHOT Show, Glock presented the "fourth generation", now dubbed "Gen4" by Glock itself. Updates centered on ergonomics and the recoil spring assembly. The initial two fourth-generation models announced were the full-sized Glock 17 and Glock 22, chambered for the 9×19mm Parabellum and .40 S&W cartridges, respectively. The pistols were displayed with a modified rough-textured frame (RTF-4), front grip strap with finger grooves, interchangeable backstraps of different sizes, and an accessory rail. "Gen4" is rollmarked on the slide next to the model number to identify the fourth-generation pistols.

The basic grip size of the fourth-generation Glock pistols is slightly smaller than that of the previous design. A punch is provided to remove the standard trigger housing pin and replace it with the longer cross pin needed to mount the medium or large backstrap that will increase the trigger distance by 2 mm (0.079 in) or 4 mm (0.16 in). With the medium backstrap installed, the grip size is identical to that of the third-generation pistols. The magazine release catches are enlarged and reversible for left-handed use. To use the exchangeable magazine release feature, fourth-generation Glock magazines have a notch cut on both sides of the magazine body. Earlier versions of the magazines will not lock into Gen4 pistols if the magazine release button has been moved to be operated by a left-handed user. Gen4 magazines will work in older models.

Mechanically, fourth-generation Glock pistols are fitted with a dual-recoil-spring assembly to reduce perceived recoil and extend service life. Earlier subcompact Glock models, such as the Glock 26 and Glock 30, already used a dual recoil spring assembly, which was carried over to the fourth-generation versions of those models. The slide and barrel shelf have been resized, and the front portion of the polymer frame has been widened and internally enlarged to accommodate the dual recoil spring assembly. The trigger mechanism housing has also been modified to fit into the smaller-sized grip space.

The introduction of fourth-generation Glock pistols continued in July 2010 when the Glock 19 and Glock 23, the reduced size "compact" versions of the Glock 17 and Glock 22, became available for retail. In late 2010, Glock continued the introduction of fourth-generation models with the Glock 26 and Glock 27 "subcompact" variants.

In January 2013, more fourth-generation Glock pistols were introduced commercially during the annual SHOT Show, including the Glock 20 Generation 4 along with other fourth-generation Glock models.

==== 2011 recoil spring assembly exchange program ====
In September 2011, Glock announced a recoil spring exchange program in which the manufacturer voluntarily offered to exchange the recoil spring assemblies of its fourth-generation pistols (except the "subcompact" Glock 26 and Glock 27 models) sold before 22 July 2011 at no cost "to ensure our products perform up to GLOCK's stringent standards", according to the company.

==== M series ====
On 29 June 2016, the United States Federal Bureau of Investigation (FBI) awarded a contract to Glock to provide new 9×19mm Parabellum chambered duty pistols. The solicitation specifications deviated from the specifications of Glock's fourth-generation models. Features found in the M series pistols evolved into what would become Glock's Fifth Generation or Gen5 pistols.

In August 2016, the Indianapolis Metro Police Department (IMPD) started training with a batch of Glock 17M pistols. The most obvious difference with the Glock fourth- and fifth-generation models on published images is the omission of finger grooves on the grip. In October of that year, the IMPD issued a 17M voluntary recall following failures encountered while dry firing the pistols during training. According to Major Riddle with the IMPD, "Glock is working to correct the problem and we hope to begin issuing the new [17Ms] as soon as December."

==== Fifth-generation models ====
A "fifth generation" Glock 17 Gen 5

In August 2017, Glock presented the "fifth generation" or "Gen 5", carrying forward much of the feature set developed for the FBI-contract M-series pistols. The revisions centered on ergonomics and improving reliability. Many parts of fifth-generation Glock pistols cannot be interchanged with those of the previous generations. The two fifth-generation models announced were the Glock 17 and Glock 19, chambered for the 9×19mm Parabellum. Some conspicuous changes on the fifth-generation models are ambidextrous slide stop levers, DLC surface finish for barrel and slide, a barrel featuring a revised style of polygonal rifling (called the "Glock Marksman Barrel" by Glock), a deeper recessed barrel crown, omission of the finger grooves on the grip, a flared magazine well, and a reintroduction of a half-moon-shaped cutout on the bottom front of the grip intended to aid forcible extraction of a stuck magazine from the flared magwell. The locking block pin, located above the trigger pin that was introduced in the third generation, is omitted. Many internal parts were revised less conspicuously.

The Gen 5 progressed through several sub-iterations over its production run. The earliest examples (2017–2019) shipped without front slide serrations and featured a dust cover profile that did not match the beveled slide nose. A running change added the matching frame bevel, and in mid-2019 Glock introduced the "FS" (front serrations) variant, which added serrations to the forward slide and dropped the half-moon magazine cutout, along with an updated breech face. "Gen 5" is rollmarked on the slide next to the model number to identify the fifth-generation pistols. The magazines were also revised for the fifth-generation models: the redesigned magazine floor plates feature a forward protruding lip to offer grip for manual assisted extraction, and the magazine follower became orange colored for easier visual identification.

==== Discontinuation of prior generations and launch of V-series models ====
In October 2025, Glock announced that it would cease production of more than 30 variants of its handguns, with shipments of most Generation 3, 4, and 5 double-stack and crossover models ending November 30, 2025. The decision was cited by Glock as a streamlining and "right-sizing" measure, but was also prompted by passage of legislation in the United States against pistols that can be easily converted to fully automatic fire (through the use of a Glock switch or other means). The single-stack slimline models (Glock 42, 43, 43X, and 48) were unaffected and continue in production.

In December 2025, Glock launched the "V Series" as replacements for the discontinued models, marked with a "V" designation on the slide and frame (e.g., G17 V, G19 V, G45 V, G26 V, G20 V MOS, G23 V, G21 V MOS, G44 V). V Series pistols feature redesigned trigger bars, revised slide rails, a narrowed firing pin channel, and modified rear plates designed to hinder the installation of full-auto conversion devices. Following the introduction of the sixth-generation pistols in January 2026, the V Series continues in production as Glock's lower-cost baseline offering and remains the only avenue for models not offered in Gen6 configuration, including the Glock 20, 23, 26, and 44.

==== Sixth-generation models ====
On December 6, 2025, Glock announced the "sixth generation" or "Gen6" of its pistol line, with commercial availability starting January 20, 2026, coinciding with the pistols' public debut at SHOT Show 2026 in Las Vegas. The initial U.S. lineup consists of three models chambered in 9×19mm Parabellum: the Glock 17 Gen6, Glock 19 Gen6, and Glock 45 Gen6, with the Glock 49 Gen6 offered internationally. Revisions center on ergonomics, trigger design, and an integrated optic-ready system. Notable exterior changes include a reshaped grip with a more pronounced palm swell, an extended thumb rest, an enlarged beavertail, an aggressively undercut trigger guard, deeper angled slide serrations, and a new flat-faced trigger. The frames feature a new "RTF6" grip texture that combines two textures across an expanded surface area including the thumb rest. All standard-frame Gen6 pistols include the new Gen6 optic-ready system, which replaces the MOS mounting system with a deeper slide cut allowing optics to sit lower, and uses a polymer plate that acts as a crush washer to absorb shear force during recoil. Gen6 pistols incorporate the internal switch-resistance modifications introduced in the V-series (revised slide rails, narrowed firing pin channel, and modified trigger bar geometry) along with additional refinements. Contrary to pre-release speculation, the Gen6 does not incorporate a modular Fire Control Unit (FCU), continuing Glock's philosophy of evolutionary rather than revolutionary design. Each pistol ships with three magazines, a cleaning kit, speed loader, backstrap set, three optic plates, and a hard storage case. Gen6 pistols retain compatibility with existing Glock magazines and are priced at the same MSRP as Gen5 models.

== Design details ==
=== Operating mechanism ===
The Glock 17 is a short recoil–operated, locked-breech semi-automatic pistol that uses a modified Browning cam-lock system adapted from the Hi-Power pistol. The firearm's locking mechanism uses a linkless, vertically tilting barrel with a rectangular breech that locks into the ejection port cut-out in the slide (the SIG Sauer system). During the recoil stroke, the barrel initially moves rearward, locked together with the slide about 3 mm (0.12 in), until the bullet leaves the barrel and the chamber pressure drops to a safe level. A ramped lug extension at the base of the barrel then interacts with a tapered locking block integrated into the frame, forcing the barrel down and unlocking it from the slide. This camming action terminates the barrel's movement while the slide continues back under recoil, extracting and ejecting the spent cartridge casing. The slide's uninterrupted rearward movement and counter-recoil cycle are characteristic of the Browning system.

Glock pistols incorporate several features intended to enhance reliability under adverse conditions, such as advanced metal coatings, "stub" slide guides instead of true frame rails, and an unusual cocking mechanism in which the trigger is partially responsible for cocking the striker. By relying partially on force from the shooter's trigger finger to cock the striker, a Glock effectively reduces the load on the recoil spring as the slide moves forward into battery. In contrast, almost all other striker-fired pistols on the market rely fully on the recoil spring to cock the striker.

=== Features ===
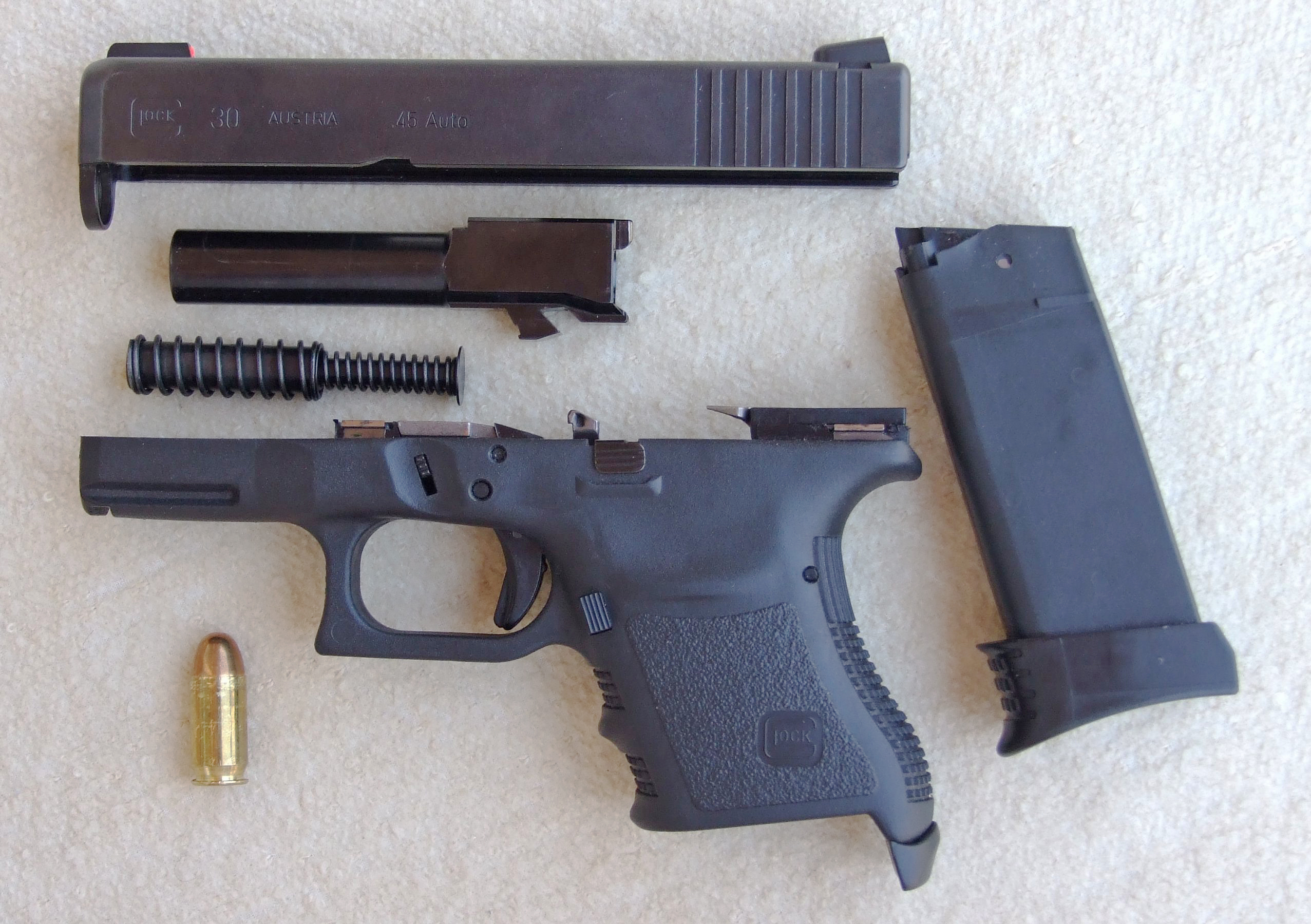
A subcompact Glock 30 field stripped to its main groups with a .45 ACP round

The slide features a spring-loaded claw extractor, and the stamped sheet metal ejector is pinned to the trigger mechanism housing. Pistols after 2002 have a reshaped extractor that serves as a loaded chamber indicator. When a cartridge is present in the chamber, a tactile metal edge protrudes slightly out immediately behind the ejection port on the right side of the slide. The striker firing mechanism has a spring-loaded firing pin that is cocked in two stages that the firing pin spring powers. The factory-standard firing pin spring is rated at 24 N (5.4 lb_{f}), but by using a modified firing pin spring, it can be increased to 28 N (6.3 lb_{f}) or to 31 N (7.0 lb_{f}). When the pistol is charged, the firing pin is in the half-cock position. As the trigger is pulled, the firing pin is then fully cocked. At the end of its travel, the trigger bar is tilted downward by the connector, releasing the firing pin to fire the cartridge. The connector resets the trigger bar so that the firing pin will be captured in half-cock at the end of the firing cycle. This is known as a preset trigger mechanism, referred to by the manufacturer as the "Safe action" trigger. The connector ensures that the pistol can fire only semiautomatically.

The factory-standard, two-stage trigger has a trigger travel of 12.5 mm (0.49 in) and is rated at 25 N (5.6 lb_{f}), but by using a modified connector, it can be increased to 35 N (7.9 lb_{f}) or lowered to 20 N (4.5 lb_{f}). In response to requests from American law enforcement agencies for a two-stage trigger with increased trigger pull, Glock introduced the NY1 (New York) trigger module, which features a flat spring in a plastic housing that replaces the trigger bar's standard coil spring. This trigger modification is available in two versions: NY1 and NY2 that are rated at 25 N (5.6 lb_{f}) to 40 N (9.0 lb_{f}) and 32 N (7.2 lb_{f}) to 50 N (11.2 lb_{f}), respectively, which require about 20 N (4.5 lb_{f}) to 30 N (6.7 lb_{f}) of force to disengage the safeties and another 10 N (2.2 lb_{f}) to 20 N (4.5 lb_{f}) in the second stage to fire a shot.

The Glock's frame, magazine body, and several other components are made from a high-strength nylon-based polymer invented by Gaston Glock, called Polymer 2. This plastic was specially formulated to provide increased durability and is more resilient than carbon steel and most steel alloys. Polymer 2 is resistant to shock, caustic liquids, and temperature extremes where traditional steel/alloy frames would warp and become brittle. The injection-molded frame contains four hardened steel guide rails for the slide: two at the rear of the frame, and the remaining pair above and in front of the trigger guard. The trigger guard itself is squared off at the front and checkered. The grip has an angle of 109° and a nonslip, stippled surface on the sides and both the front and rear straps. The frame houses the locking block, which is an investment casting that engages a 45° camming surface on the barrel's lower camming lug. It is retained in the frame by a steel axis pin that holds the trigger and slide catch. The trigger housing is held to the frame by means of a polymer pin. A spring-loaded sheet-metal pressing serves as the slide catch, secured against unintentional manipulation by a raised guard molded into the frame. Because of its polymer construction, there were initially fears that Glock pistols would be invisible to airport X-ray machines, making them easy to illegally import into the United States. In actuality, the majority of the gun's weight comes from steel components, and Polymer 2 is visible to X-ray machines. Concern over the myth led to the passage of the Undetectable Firearms Act in the United States in 1988, banning the manufacture or import of any gun that could pass undetected through a metal detector. The myth was later popularized further by a scene in Die Hard 2 (1990), in which a fictional "Glock 7" is described as a porcelain pistol invisible to airport security.

The Glock pistol has a relatively low slide profile, which holds the barrel axis close to the shooter's hand, making the pistol more comfortable to fire by reducing muzzle rise and allowing faster aim recovery in rapid-fire sequences. The rectangular slide is milled from a single block of ordnance-grade steel using CNC machinery. The barrel and slide undergo two hardening processes before treatment with a proprietary nitriding process called Tenifer. The Tenifer treatment is applied in a 500 °C (932 °F) nitrate bath. The Tenifer finish is between 0.04 and 0.05 mm (0.0016 and 0.0020 in) in thickness, and is characterized by extreme resistance to wear and corrosion; it penetrates the metal, and treated parts have similar properties even below the surface to a certain depth.

The Tenifer process produces a matte gray-colored, nonglare surface with a 64 Rockwell C hardness rating and a 99% resistance to salt water corrosion (which meets or exceeds stainless steel specifications), making the Glock particularly suitable for individuals carrying the pistol concealed as the highly chloride-resistant finish allows the pistol to endure the effects of perspiration better. Glock steel parts using the Tenifer treatment are more corrosion resistant than analogous gun parts having other finishes or treatments, including Teflon, bluing, hard chrome plating, or phosphates. During 2010, Glock switched from the salt bath nitriding Tenifer process to a not exactly disclosed gas nitriding process. After applying the nitriding process, a black Parkerized decorative surface finish is applied. The underlying nitriding treatment will remain, protecting these parts even if the decorative surface finish were to wear off.

A fourth-generation Glock 17 consists of 34 parts. For maintenance, the pistol disassembles into five main groups: the barrel, slide, frame, magazine, and recoil-spring assembly. The firearm is designed for the NATO-standard 9×19mm Parabellum cartridge, but can use high-power (increased pressure) +P ammunition with either full-metal-jacket or jacketed hollow-point projectiles.

=== Barrel ===
The hammer-forged barrel has a female type polygonal rifling with a right-hand twist. The stabilization of the round is not by conventional rifling, using lands and grooves, but rather through a polygonal profile consisting of a series of six or eight interconnected noncircular segments (only the .45 ACP and .45 GAP have octagonal polygonal rifling). Each depressed segment within the interior of the barrel is the equivalent of a groove in a conventional barrel. Thus, the interior of the barrel consists of smooth arcs of steel rather than sharply defined slots. Instead of using a traditional broaching machine to cut the rifling into the bore, the hammer forging process involves beating a slowly rotating mandrel through the bore to obtain the hexagonal or octagonal shape. As a result, the barrel's thickness in the area of each groove is not compromised as with conventional square-cut barrels. This has the advantage of providing a better gas seal behind the projectile as the bore has a slightly smaller diameter, which translates into more efficient use of the combustion gases trapped behind the bullet, slightly greater (consistency in) muzzle velocities, and increased accuracy and ease of maintenance.

The newer lines of Glock pistols—i.e., Gen5, G42/43—are equipped with the Glock Marksmanship Barrel, or GMB. While older barrels were somewhat difficult to identify a bullet as coming from a particular barrel with high enough reliability for evidentiary use, the newer GMB ones are designed differently. A study by Stephen Christen and Hans Rudolf Jordi, published in Forensic Science International in February 2019, shows that the new GMB barrels leave more distinctive markings on the fired projectile. These marks were more easily identified than previous pistol barrel markings and were sufficient for reliably tying a bullet to a particular barrel. The study used a comparison microscope and an ABIS (Evofinder).

=== Safety ===
Glock pistols lack a traditional on-off safety lever, which Glock markets as an advantage, especially to police departments, as the user can fire immediately without separately manipulating a safety. Instead, the pistols are designed with three independent safety mechanisms to prevent accidental discharge. The system, designated "Safe Action" by Glock, consists of an external integrated trigger safety and two automatic internal safeties: a firing pin safety and a drop safety. The external safety is a small inner lever contained in the trigger. Pressing the lever activates the trigger bar and sheet metal connector. The firing pin safety is a solid, hardened steel pin that, in the secured state, blocks the firing pin channel (disabling the firing pin in its longitudinal axis). It is pushed upward to release the firing pin, firing only when the trigger is actuated and the safety is pushed up by the backward movement of the trigger bar. The drop safety guides the trigger bar in a ramp that is released only when direct rearward pressure is applied to the trigger. The three safety mechanisms are automatically disengaged one after the other when the trigger is squeezed, and are automatically reactivated when the trigger is released.

In 2003, Glock announced the Internal Locking System (ILS) safety feature named Glock Safety Lock. The ILS is a manually activated lock located in the back of the pistol's grip. It is cylindrical in design and, according to Glock, each key is unique. When activated, the lock causes a tab to protrude from the rear of the grip, providing both a visual and tactile indication of whether the lock is engaged. When activated, the ILS renders the Glock unfireable, as well as making it impossible to disassemble. When disengaged, the ILS adds no further safety mechanisms to the Glock pistol. The ILS is available as an option on most Glock pistols. Glock pistols cannot be retrofitted to accommodate the ILS. The lock must be factory-built in Austria and shipped as a special order.

=== Magazine ===
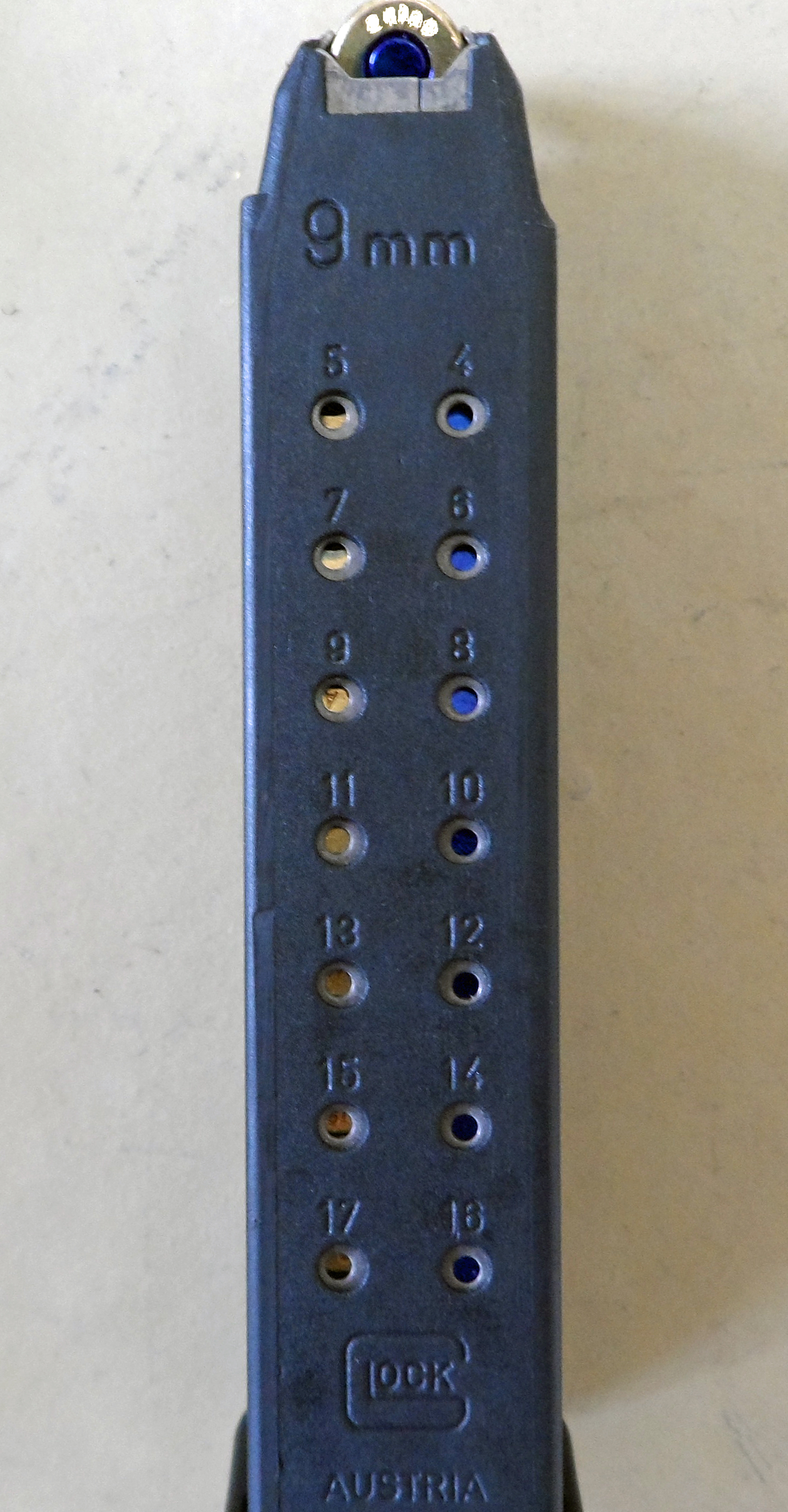
A Glock 9×19mm Parabellum 17-round magazine. The numbered witness holes at the back portion visually indicate how many cartridges are contained in the magazine.

The Glock 17 feeds from staggered-column or double-stack magazines that have a 17-round capacity (which can be extended to 19 with an optional floor plate) or optional 24 or 33-round capacity magazines. For jurisdictions that restrict magazine capacity to 10 rounds, Glock offers single-stack, 10-round magazines. The magazines are made of steel and are overmolded with plastic. A steel spring drives a plastic follower. After the last cartridge has been fired, the slide remains open on the slide stop. The slide stop release lever is located on the left side of the frame directly beneath the slide and can be manipulated by the thumb of the right-handed shooter.

Glock magazines are interchangeable between models of the same caliber, meaning that a compact or subcompact pistol will accept magazines designed for the larger pistols chambered for the same round. However, magazines designed for compact and subcompact models will not function in larger pistols because they are not tall enough to reach the slide and magazine release. For example, the subcompact Glock 26 will accept magazines from both the full-size Glock 17 and the compact Glock 19, but the Glock 17 will not accept magazines from the smaller Glock 19 or the Glock 26. The magazines for the Glock 36, the Glock 42, the Glock 43, and the Glock 44 are all unique; they cannot use magazines intended for another model, nor can their magazines be used in other models.

=== Sights ===
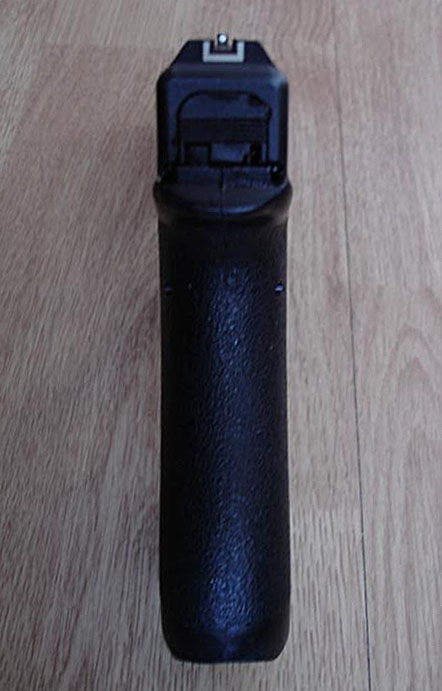
Standard sighting arrangement of a "first-generation" Glock 17

The first Glock pistols sent to the United States in 1985 failed to meet the BATF import "points" requirement, requiring Glock to quickly develop an adjustable rear sight which allowed for the pistols to be imported and sold commercially in 1986. It is believed that Glock designed and created this adjustable rear sight over a weekend to meet the ATF's importation requirements, and so it was dubbed the "weekend" sight. These first-generation adjustable rear sights extended past the slide and were susceptible to breaking. Even on later models, the front sight can easily become misshapen from friction against the holster, leading to replacements with metal sights, or tritium illuminated night sights.

More commonly today, the Glock 17 has a fixed polymer combat-type sighting arrangement that consists of a ramped front sight and a notched rear sight with white contrast elements painted on for increased acquisition speed – a white dot on the front post and a rectangular border on the rear notch. Some newer rear sights can be adjusted for windage (on certain models, due to the windage sights not being included as a factory default), as they have a degree of lateral movement in the dovetail they are mounted in. Three other factory rear sight configurations are available in addition to the standard 6.5 mm (0.26 in) height sight: a lower impact 6.1 mm (0.24 in) sight, and two higher impact versions – 6.9 mm (0.27 in) and 7.3 mm (0.29 in).

=== Accessories ===
The Glock pistol accessories available from the factory include several devices for tactical illumination, such as a series of front rail-mounted "Glock tactical lights" featuring a white tactical light and an optional visible laser sight. An alternative version of the tactical light, using an invisible infrared light and a laser sight, is available and designed to be used with an infrared night vision device. Another lighting accessory is an adapter that mounts a flashlight to the bottom of a magazine.

Polymer holsters in various configurations and matching magazine pouches are available. In addition, Glock produces optional triggers, recoil springs, slide stops, magazine release levers, and maritime spring cups. Maritime spring cups are designed to allow the pistol to be fired immediately after being submerged in water. They feature additional openings that allow liquids to flow and escape around them, offering enhanced reliability when water has penetrated the firing pin assembly channel.

Magazine floor plates (or +2 baseplates), which expand the capacity of the standard magazines by two rounds, are available for models chambered for the 9×19mm Parabellum, .45 GAP, .40 S&W, .357 SIG, and .380 ACP cartridges. In addition to the standard nonadjustable polymer sight line, Glock offers three alternative sight lines. These consist of steel, adjustable, and self-illuminating tritium night rear sights and factory steel and self-illuminating tritium contrast pointer steel front sights.

The Glock 17 along with many variants can accept pistol conversion kits, with one such example being the FAB-Defense KPOS Scout. They can also accept special stocks like the Flux Defense Brace.

==== Glock switch ====
A Glock switch is an aftermarket accessory that depresses the firearm's sear, allowing fully automatic fire. Without the proper license, they are illegal in the United States.

=== Commemorative, anniversary, engraved, and other rare Glocks ===
Glock began producing limited edition and commemorative Glocks in 1991. Glock later produced a series of anniversary models to celebrate business milestones and in honor of 20, 25, and 30 years of US sales. Additionally, many law enforcement agencies had the department name, logo, or badges engraved on the slides of issued duty weapons.

== Variants ==
Following the introduction of the Glock 17, numerous variants and versions have been offered. Different model numbers identify variants that differ in caliber, frame, and slide length, except for a few models with a letter suffix (the Glock 17L, 19X, 30S, and 43X).

The original double-stack "small frame" Glock pistols are made in five form factors, all modeled after the original full-sized Glock 17. "Standard" models are designed as full-sized duty firearms with a large magazine capacity. "Compact" models are slightly smaller with reduced magazine capacity and lighter weight while maintaining a usable grip length. "Subcompact" models are designed for easier carry and being lighter and shorter, are intended to be used with two fingers on the grip below the trigger guard, and lack an accessory rail like the larger, after generation two, Glock models. The other two form factors use the full-size "standard" frame with longer slides that include a lower section to fill in the space between the frame's dust cover and the front of the slide. The first of these is the "long slide" models, which were too long for certain IPSC classes, necessitating the creation of the intermediate "competition" models. Currently, the available chamberings for all five form factors are 9mm Parabellum (9×21mm in certain countries) and .40 Smith & Wesson. Additionally, .357 SIG and .45 GAP chamberings are offered in "standard", "compact", and "subcompact" models, while .380 ACP is offered only in "compact" and "sub-compact" models. Recently, so-called "crossover" versions in 9mm Parabellum pair short (front-to-back) "compact" frames with longer "standard" grip lengths. This was initially intended to provide a longer-grip, higher-capacity version of the Glock 19 (Glock 19X and Glock 45). Still, Glock developed the Glock 47 for US Customs and Border Protection, which used the G45 frame with a G17-length slide that included a front section to fill the gap between the dust cover and the front of the slide, a design that maintains the same overall dimensions as the Glock 17. Naturally, the next step was to couple this slide with the Glock 19 Frame, creating the Glock 49.

There are also the wider double-stack "large frame" Glock pistols for use with larger calibers, currently in 10mm Auto and .45 ACP. These models have bigger, wider slides and frames and are larger than the smaller-chambered pistols. These come in only "standard", "subcompact", "competition" (.45 ACP only), and "long slide" (10mm only). Additionally, Glock introduced the "subcompact" Glock 30S in .45 ACP, fitted with the Glock 36's slimmer, lighter slide. Also, in 2007, Glock introduced a "short frame" version of these large frame weapons to provide a grip better suited to small hands. The short frame was originally designed to compete in the now-canceled U.S. military Joint Combat Pistol trials for a new .45 ACP pistol to replace the M9 pistol. Glock's entry featured an optional ambidextrous magazine release and a MIL-STD-1913 rail, along with a reduced backstrap. The Glock 21SF was originally available in three versions: one with a Picatinny rail and an ambidextrous magazine release, and two with a Universal Glock rail, available with or without the ambidextrous magazine release. However, the ambidextrous release and Picatinny rail were soon dropped. As of January 2009, the Glock 20, 21, 29, and 30 were offered in short-framed variations. These models incorporate a 2.5 mm (0.098 in) reduction in trigger reach, and full-sized models feature a 4 mm (0.16 in) reduction in heel depth, which corresponds to an overall reduction in length for those models. The short frame models were not introduced for the Gen 4 and Gen 5 models, as the replaceable backstraps design makes a separate short frame version redundant.

Glock also produces single-stack "slimline" models, targeting the concealed carry market. The first was introduced with Gen 3 in .45 ACP as the Glock 36. More recently, after the introduction of Gen 5, came the Glock 42 in .380 ACP, followed by the Glock 43 in 9mm Parabellum. The most recent additions to the "slimline" series, the 43X and 48, were introduced together in 9mm Parabellum. These have longer grips that allow for a full three-finger hold and a 10-round capacity. The 43X is a long grip "crossover" 43, while the 48 has a longer slide to provide a "slimline" version of the "compact" Glock 19.

Glock Variants with normal frame width (slide size/grip size)
Caliber	Subcompact (SC)/SC	Compact (C)/C	C/Standard (Std)	Std/C	Std/Std	Competition/Std	Long Slide/Std
9×19mm	G26	G19, (Note: G19 compact size slide is interchangeable with G47 and G49 standard size slides and the G19X and G45 compact size slides.) G46	G19X, (Note: G19X compact size slide is interchangeable with G47 and G49 standard size slides and the G19 and G45 compact size slides.) G45 (Note: G45 compact size slide is interchangeable with G47 and G49 standard size slides and the G19 and G19X compact size slides.)	G49 (Note: G49 standard size slide is interchangeable with G47 standard size slide and G19, G19X, and G45 compact size slides.)	G17, (Note: G17 standard size slide is interchangeable with G17L long slide and G34 competition size slide.) G18, G47, (Note: G47 standard size slide is interchangeable with G49 standard size slide and G19, G19X, and G45 compact size slides.) P80	G34 (Note: G34 competition size slide is interchangeable with G17 standard size slide and G17L long slide.)	G17L (Note: G17L long slide is interchangeable with G17 standard size slide and G34 competition size slide.)
10mm Auto	G29				G20 (Note: G20 standard size slide is interchangeable with G40 long slide.)		G40 (Note: G40 long slide is interchangeable with G20 standard size slide.)
.45 ACP	G30, G30S (Note: G30S slim slide is interchangeable with G36 slim slide.)				G21 (Note: G21 standard size slide is interchangeable with G41 long slide.)	G41 (Note: G41 long slide is interchangeable with G21 standard size slide.)	
.40 S&W	G27	G23			G22 (Note: G22 standard size slide is interchangeable with G24 long slide and G35 competition size slide.)	G35 (Note: G35 competition size slide is interchangeable with G22 standard size slide and G24 long slide.)	G24 (Note: G24 long slide is interchangeable with G22 standard size slide and G35 competition size slide.)
.380 Auto	G28	G25					
.357 SIG	G33	G32			G31		
.45 G.A.P.	G39	G38			G37		
22 LR		G44					

Glock Variants with slimline frame width (slide size/grip size)
Caliber	Subcompact (SC)/SC	SC/Compact (C)	C/C
9×19mm	G43 (slim) (Note: G43 subcompact size slide is interchangeable with G43X subcompact and G48 compact slide.)	G43X (slim) (Note: G43X subcompact size slide is interchangeable with G43 subcompact and G48 compact slide.)	G48 (slim) (Note: G48 compact size slide is interchangeable with subcompact slides of G43 and G43X.)
.45 ACP	G36 (slim) (Note: G36 slim slide is interchangeable with G30S slim slide.)		
.380 Auto	G42 (slim)		

=== 9×19mm Parabellum ===
- Glock 17: The Glock 17 is the original 9×19mm Parabellum model, with a standard magazine capacity of 17 rounds, introduced in 1982. Initial samples of the new civilian offering were marked Glock 82. But, it was decided not to use the year to designate civilian models, but to begin the model numbers at 17 and continue numerically from there. Glock also offers a version of the standard magazine that incorporates a longer "+2" base plate, increasing capacity to 19 rounds. Also, a 10-round version of the standard magazine was created for markets that restrict handgun magazine capacity. Glock also offers an extended 24-round (with flush base plate) magazine for the Glock 17. Finally, the Glock 17 can use the Glock 18's extended 33-round magazine (with a +2 base plate). The base plates for the extended magazines can be swapped out to create 26- and 31-round magazines as well. The longest-serving of the Glocks, the Glock 17 can be had with numerous "options," such as a threaded barrel or slides cut for the Modular Optic System (MOS). Some options, such as the universal Glock rail, have become standard. In addition, some features have been given their own suffixed model designations, creating entirely new models, all of which can use the same magazines as the Glock 17:
  - Glock 17L: Introduced in 1988, the 17L incorporates a longer slide and extended barrel. Initially, the Glock 17L had three holes in the top of the barrel and a corresponding slot in the slide; however, later production pistols lack these holes. The Glock 17L is manufactured in limited quantities.
  - Glock 17C: Introduced in 1996, the 17C incorporates slots cut in the barrel and slide to compensate for recoil. Many other Glock pistols now come with this option, all of which have a "C" suffix on the slide.
  - Glock 17MB: The 17MB is a version with an ambidextrous magazine catch. This model, along with the other MB variants, was no longer available when the fourth-generation models introduced a reversible magazine catch.
  - Glock 17M: Introduced in 2016, the 17M was created in response to an FBI solicitation for a new full-size 9mm pistol. Differences from the Generation 4 model include the removal of the finger grooves, an ambidextrous slide lock, a rounded slide nose profile, a flared magazine well with new magazine baseplates, and a tougher finish on metal components. The Glock 17M also abandons the polygonal rifling of previous models in favor of conventional rifling. As of 2017, the Federal Bureau of Investigation, the South Carolina Highway Patrol and the Ontario Provincial Police have adopted the pistol as standard.
  - Glock P80: Introduced in 2020, the P80 was commissioned by United States firearms distributor Lipsey's to create an exclusive commemorative Glock model, the Pistole 80. The P80 is a throwback to the original Glock 17 Gen 1 type pistol chambered in 9×19mm with an original Gen 1 frame and stippling and Gen 2/Gen 3 internals.
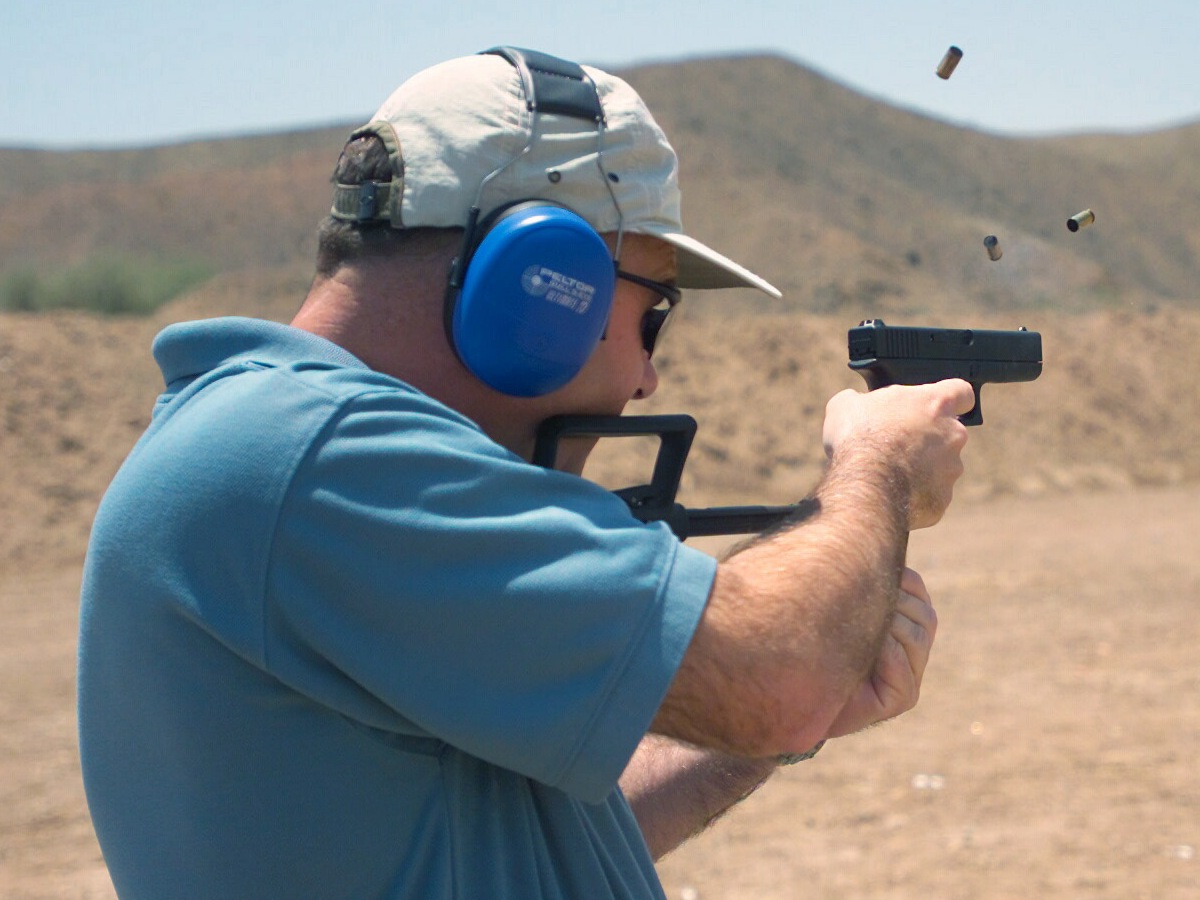
    Man firing a fully automatic 9×19mm Glock 18C machine pistol with a shoulder stock
- Glock 18: The Glock 18 is a selective-fire variant of the Glock 17, developed at the request of the Austrian counter-terrorist unit EKO Cobra, and as a way to internally test Glock components under high-strain conditions. Originally produced in 1986, this machine pistol–class firearm has a lever-type fire-control circular selector switch, installed on the serrated portion of the rear left side of the slide. With the selector lever in the bottom position, the pistol fires fully automatically at a cyclic rate of 1,100–1,400 RPM (rounds per minute), and with the selector lever in the top position, the pistol fires semi-automatically. The firearm is typically used with an extended 33-round-capacity magazine and may be fired with or without a shoulder stock, although other Glock 17 magazines with capacities of 10, 17, 19, or 24 rounds can be used. Unlike all Glock's other pistols, it is only offered to military, law enforcement, and government organizations. Early Glock 18 models were ported to reduce muzzle rise during automatic fire. A very early design introduced a longer ported barrel, which was soon discarded as it would not fit in a holster. Another compensated variant was produced, known as the Glock 18C. It has a keyhole opening cut into the forward portion of the slide, similar to the opening on the Glock long-slide models, although the Glock 18 has a standard-length slide. The keyhole opening provides an area for the four progressively larger (from back to front) compensator cuts machined into the barrel to vent propellant gases upward, affording more control over the rapid-firing machine pistol.
  - Glock 18C: The compensator cuts start about halfway back on the top of the barrel. The two rear cuts are narrower than the two front cuts. The slide is hollowed, or dished-out, in a rectangular pattern between the rear of the ejection port and the rear sight. The rate of fire in fully automatic mode is around 1,100–1,200 rounds per minute. Most other characteristics are equivalent to the Glock 17, although the slide, frame, and certain fire-control parts of the Glock 18 are not interchangeable with those of other Glock models.
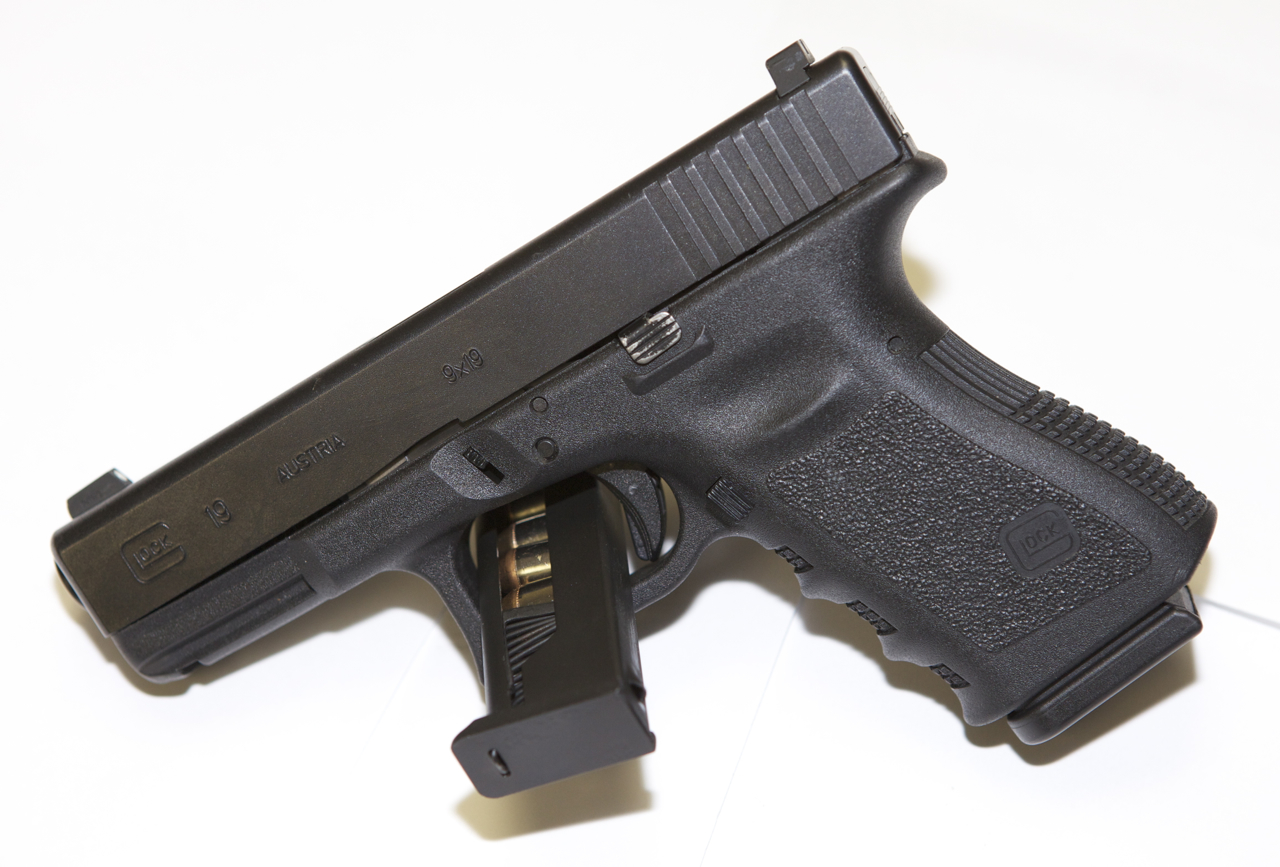
    Glock 19 Gen 3
- Glock 19: The Glock 19 is effectively a reduced-size Glock 17, called the "Compact" by the manufacturer. It was first produced in 1988, primarily for military and law enforcement. The Glock 19's barrel and pistol grip are shorter by about 12 mm (0.5 in) than the Glock 17, and it uses a magazine with a standard capacity of 15 rounds. A 10-round version of this magazine is also made for markets that restrict handgun magazine capacity. And, a "+2" base plate can make the standard magazine into a longer 17-round magazine. The pistol is also compatible with any magazines designed for the Glock 17 and Glock 18, providing factory magazine capacities of 17, 19, 24, and 33. Changing out base plates adds capacities of 26 or 31. To preserve the operational reliability of the short recoil system, the mass of the slide remains the same as in the Glock 17 from which it is derived. Except for the slide, frame, barrel, locking block, recoil spring, guide rod, and slide lock spring, all other components are interchangeable between models 17 and 19. The Glock 19 Gen 4 MOS (Modular Optic System) has also been used by Special Operations Forces as the Mk 27 MOD 2. One of the oldest of the Glock pistols, options like threaded barrel and MOS slide cuts are available, and suffixed model designations have been created for some features, all of which, except for the G19X, can use any magazine the G19 can:
  Glock 19X proposed by Glock GmbH for XM17 Modular Handgun System competition
  - Glock 19X: The 19X is the civilian version of Glock's entry to the XM17 Modular Handgun System competition for the United States Armed Forces. It features a Glock 19 slide with a Glock 17-like frame in coyote brown instead of the standard black. The frame includes a lanyard loop and a front lip in the magazine, whose purpose is to make changing magazines with gloves on easier, but this means the new Gen 5 17-round magazines cannot be used in the Glock 19X because the front lip will block the extended magazine floor plates from locking into the 19X's magazine well. This can be remedied by switching to a Gen 4–style magazine floor plate or with a factory +2 extension. The G19X can use any factory G17 magazine for Gen 4 and prior. It cannot accept only the Gen 5 17- and 19-round magazines. The 19X comes standard with night sights and includes one 17-round magazine and two 19-round magazines, all in coyote color. The Glock 19X has proven to be one of Glock's best-selling pistols, with over 100,000 sold within 6 months of its release.
  - Glock 19M: Introduced in 2016, the 19M was created in response to an FBI solicitation for a new compact 9mm pistol. Differences from the Generation 4 model include the removal of the finger grooves, an ambidextrous slide stop, a rounded slide nose profile, a flared magazine well with new magazine baseplates, and a tougher finish on metal components. The Glock 19M also abandons the polygonal rifling of previous models in favor of conventional rifling. The US Marine Corps fielded the Glock 19M, designated as the M007, to CID (Criminal Investigation Division) and Marine One personnel.
  - Glock 19 Canadian: The limit for Restricted Class firearms in Canada is a 105mm barrel, so, due to its 102mm barrel, the standard Glock 19 is too short to be legal. Starting in 2017, a market-specific Glock 19 has been sold in Canada with a 106mm barrel and a distinctive laser-engraved hollow maple leaf on the right side of the slide.
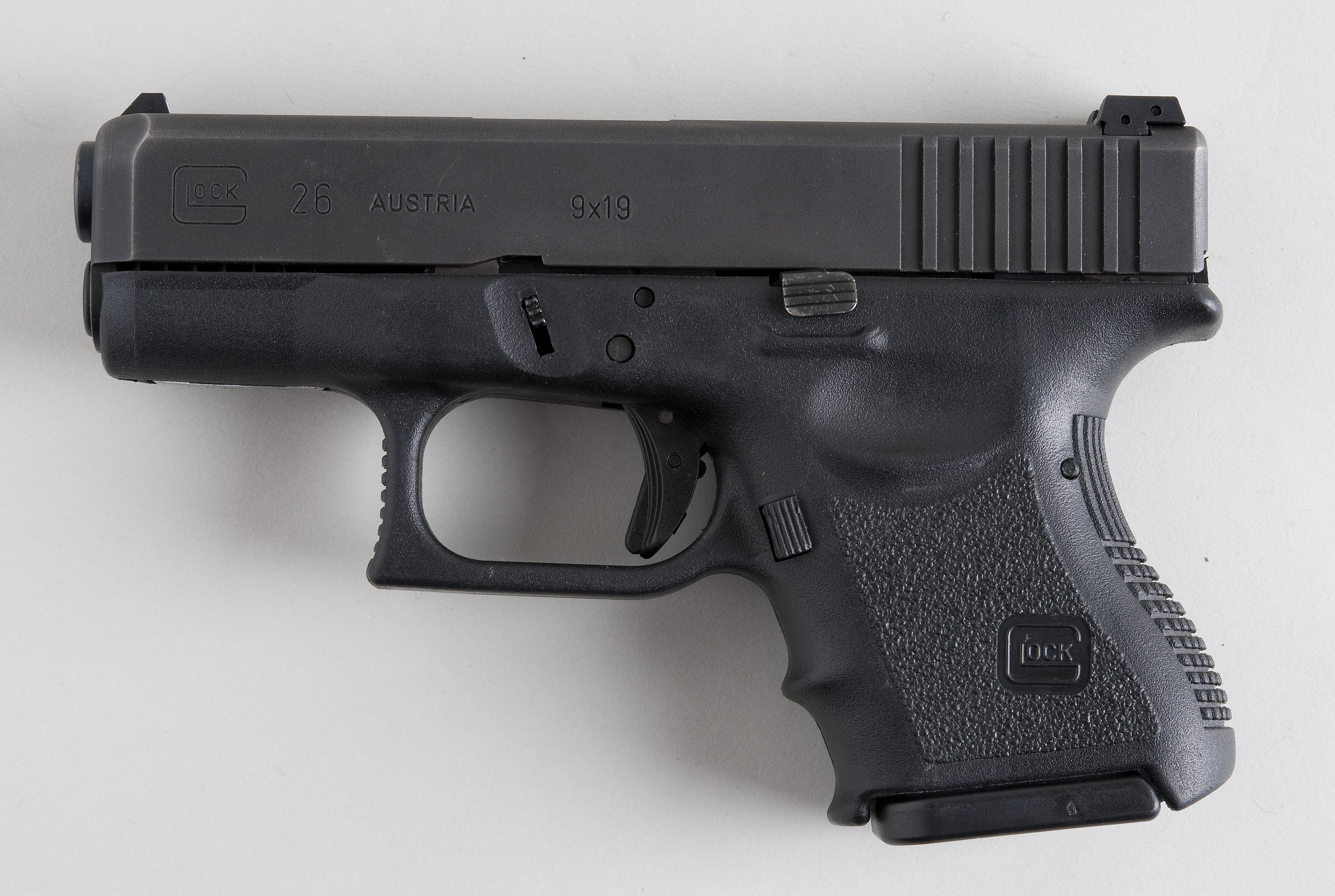
    The subcompact Glock 26 with factory adjustable sights in 9×19mm Parabellum
- Glock 26: The Glock 26 is a 9×19mm "subcompact" variant designed for concealed carry and was introduced in 1995, mainly for the civilian market. Nicknamed the Baby Glock, it has also been acquired by the US military and designated Mk 26. It features a smaller frame compared to the Glock 19, with a pistol grip that supports only two fingers, a shorter barrel and slide, and a double-stack magazine with a standard capacity of 10 rounds. A factory magazine with a +2 extension gives a capacity of 12 rounds. In addition, the Glock 26 can use factory magazines from the Glock 17, Glock 18, and Glock 19, and one can swap out base plates to give it capacities of 15, 17, 19, 24, 26, 31, and 33 rounds. More than simply a "shortened" Glock 19, the design of the subcompact Glock 26 required extensive rework of the frame, locking block, and dual-recoil-spring assembly. MOS options are available, but the Glock universal rail is not offered so far. There is also:
  - Glock 26 for U.S. Customs and Border Protection (CBP): This Glock is a Generation 5 Glock for the CBP that incorporates a flared magazine well with an extended, longer grip than that of the usual Gen 5 Glock 26. Moreover, the magazine well is flat across and has no bump, like the Glock 25 Gen 5 or the G19X. In addition, it offers a longer 11-round magazine.
- Glock 34: The Glock 34 is a competition version of the Glock 17. It is similar to its predecessor, the Glock 17L, but with a slightly shorter slide and barrel, to meet the maximum size requirements for many sanctioned action pistol sporting events. It was developed and produced in 1998, and compared to the Glock 17, features a 21 mm (0.8 in) longer barrel and slide. It has an extended magazine release, extended slide stop lever, 20 N (4.5 lb_{f}) trigger pull, and an adjustable rear sight. The sides at the front of the slide are slanted instead of squared. Further, the top of the slide and parts of its inside are milled out, creating a conspicuous hole at the top designed to reduce front-end muzzle weight to better balance the pistol and reduce the overall weight of the slide. The Glock 34 can accept any magazine the Glock 17 can accept.
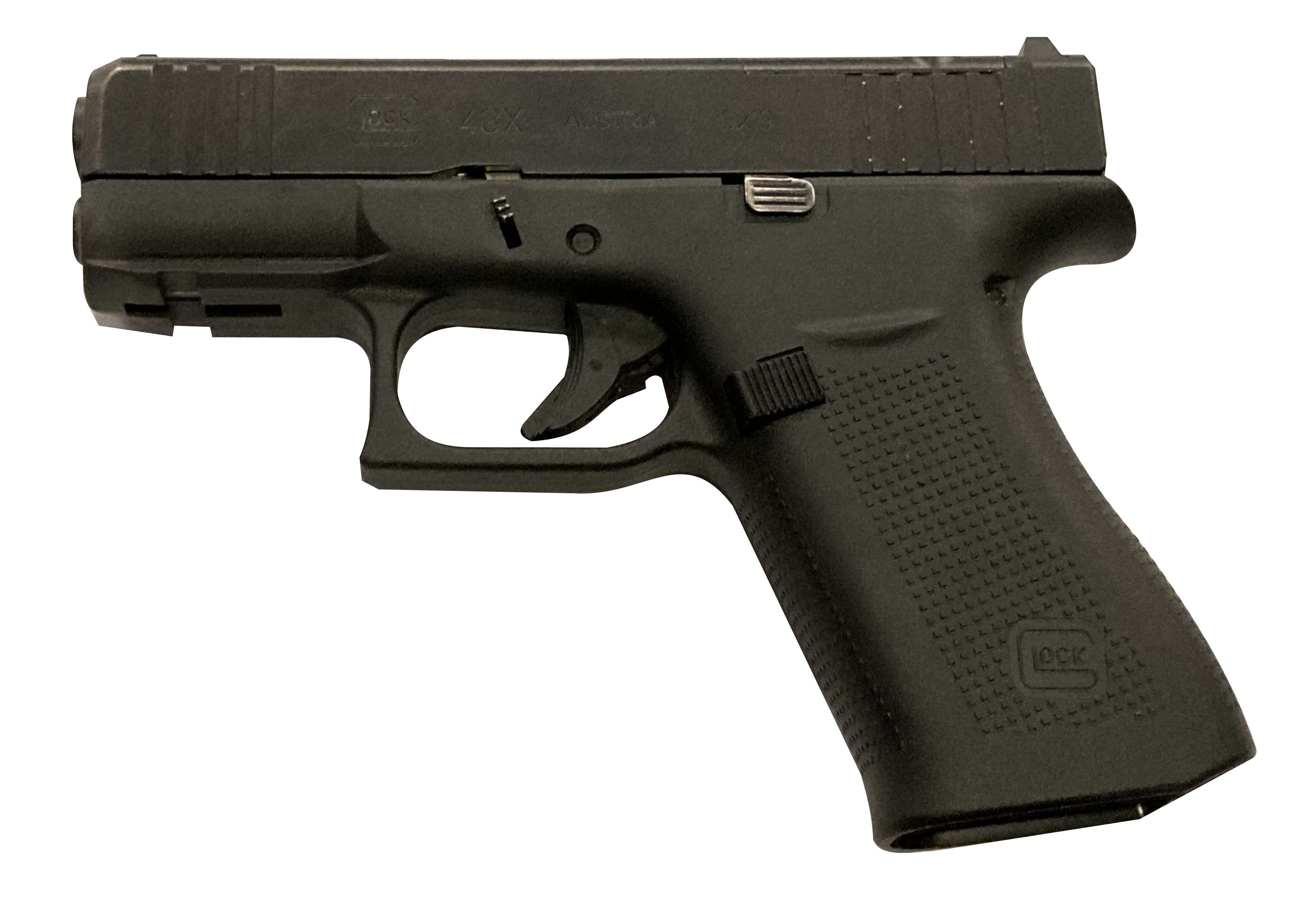
  Glock 43X
- Glock 43: The Glock 43 is a "slimline" version of the subcompact Glock 26 that features an ultracompact slide and frame. The Glock 43 is the first Glock pistol to be manufactured with a single-stack 9×19mm Parabellum magazine, which has a standard capacity of six rounds and is unique to the model. Unlike other subcompact Glock pistols, the Glock 43 cannot use factory magazines from its larger relatives due to its single-stack magazine design. It also does not allow removal of the backplate grip, as is possible on the 4th-gen Glocks. The magazine is thinner than the Glock 43X, and the Glock 43 cannot accept magazines for the Glock 43X.
  - Glock 43X: The 43X is similar to the 43, except it has a longer, thicker grip for a 10-round magazine capacity. The grip of the Glock 43X is comparable to that of the 48 and can be interchanged. Glock 43X magazines do not fit into the Glock 43, or vice versa. The 43X also features front slide serrations, a built-in extended beaver tail, a reversible magazine catch (similar to Gen 5 models), GMB rifling (again similar to Gen 5 models), and a two-tone finish (silver slide/black receiver). In the EU the 43X comes with a rail. At least three aftermarket sources manufacture 15-round flush-fit magazines for the Glock 43X and Glock 48, which make the Glock 43X and Glock 48 match the standard capacity of the Glock 19 in a narrower pistol. During the 2026 NRA Annual Meetings & Exhibits, Glock announced their own 15-round magazines for the 43X in a metal, double stack design, coming to market in May 2026.
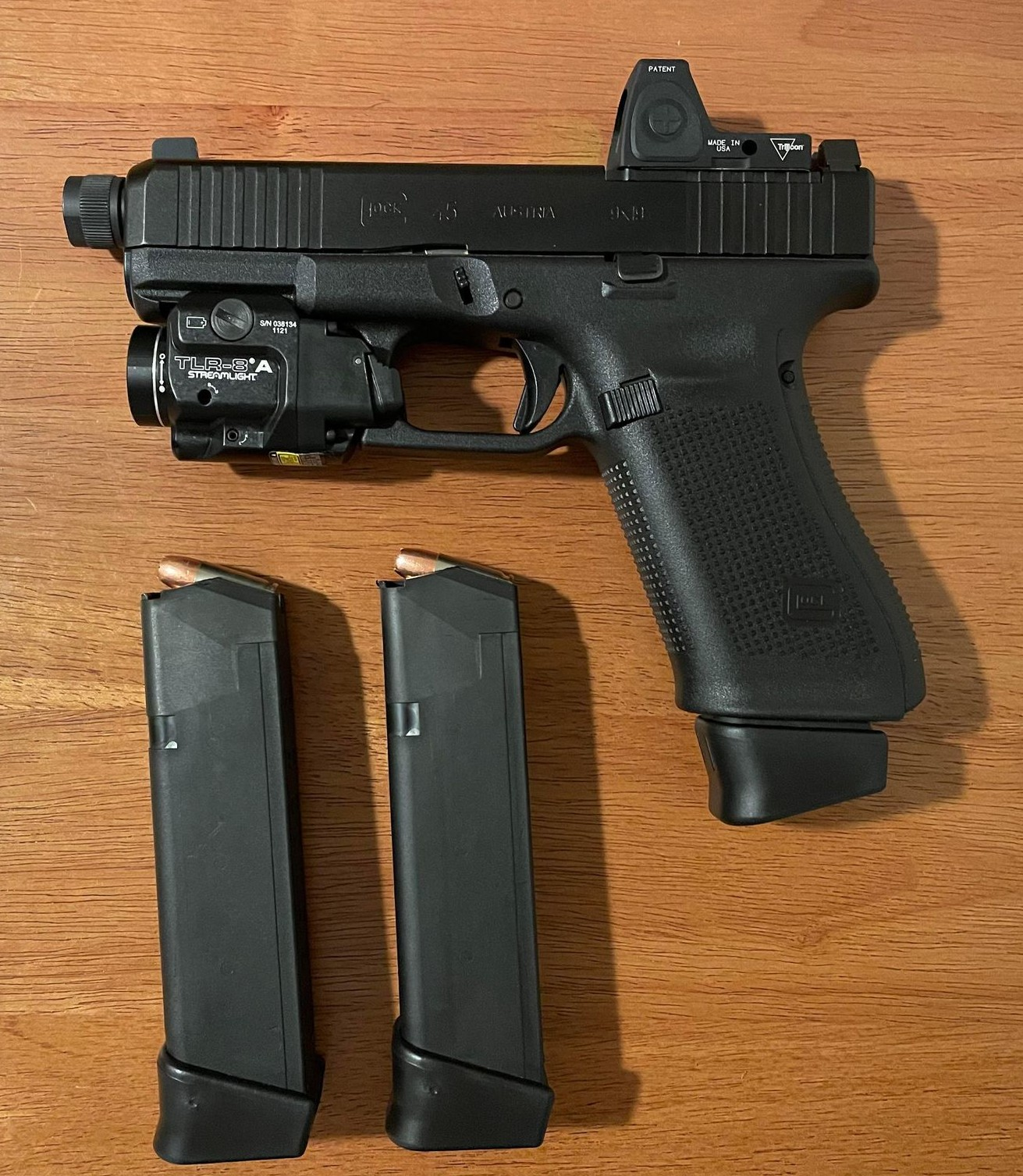
    Glock 45 MOS
- Glock 45: The Glock 45 , similar to the Glock 19X, incorporates Gen5 features catered for police use. The Glock 45 frame features a full-size grip length like the Glock 17, with a shorter Glock 19-length dust cover, and is fitted with a Glock 19 slide with front slide serrations. Unlike the Glock 19X, the Glock 45 features a flared magazine well and can accommodate Gen 5 magazines because it does not have the front lip that blocks the Gen 5 magazine's extended floor plate. The Glock 45 also deletes the lanyard loop found at the back of the grip on the 19X and comes standard with plastic sights instead of the night sights standard on the 19X.
- Glock 46: The Glock 46 is a "compact" version like the Glock 19. This model has a rotating barrel breech lock system. It had been designed as option to bid for a service pistol, with law enforcement agencies in Germany at state and federal level in mind. The differing breech-lock system allows disassembly of the firearm without pressing the trigger, provided no projectile is chambered. Also, enhanced drop-safety is a must – the model complies with the specifications in the German technical guideline (Technische Richtlinie "Pistole") for service pistols. Police in Saxony-Anhalt chose the Glock 46 TR among three competitors and are to receive up to 8,600 new pistols until 2021 for over 6,400 officers, replacing their ageing Pistole 6 (P6), a SIG Sauer P225 variant. The state of Saxony-Anhalt is the first to introduce a pistol made by Glock as a standard-issue sidearm into its force.
- Glock 47: The Glock 47 is a full-sized handgun created for the U.S. Customs and Border Protection, who wanted a version of the Glock 17 that has full parts compatibility with a Glock 19, saving for the slide and barrel. This means that the G47 slide and barrel can be put on a G19 frame to give the G19 a longer slide, barrel, and sight radius (the equivalent of a Glock 49), and the G19 slide and barrel can be put on a G47 frame to create a pistol that functions like a Glock 45. The G47 recoil spring assembly is the same as for the G19. The G47 frame is the same as the G45, with a shorter dust cover, and the G17-length slide is modified to fill the gap, similar to the G34. The G47 also comes with MOS cuts and magazines that have the Gen 5 extended base plate. In short, G47 and G19 Gen5/MOS/MOD1/FS have modularity between both pistols. Reportedly, the US Secret Service is also using this model, and the G47 Gen 5 MOS is now available to the public.
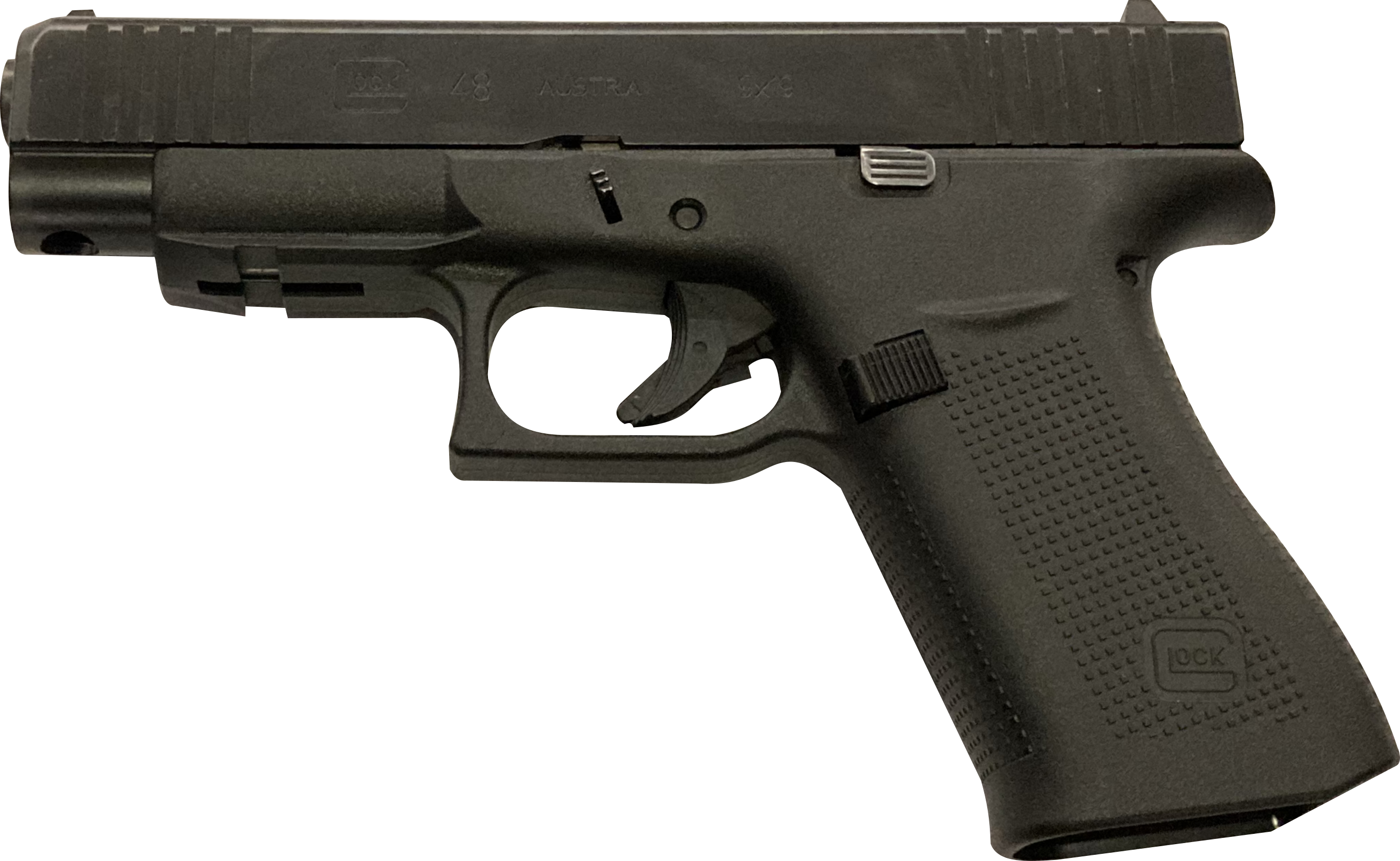
  Glock 48
- Glock 48: The Glock 48 is a "slimline" version similar to the subcompact Glock 43 and 43X. All components of the Glock 48 are identical to those of the Glock 43X, except the slide and barrel, which are longer. The slides for the Glock 43, Glock 43X, and Glock 48 are functional on any of those three frames. The G48 features a 4.17-inch-long barrel, front slide serrations, a built-in extended beaver tail, a reversible magazine catch (similar to Gen 5 models), GMB rifling (again similar to Gen 5 models), a two-tone finish (silver slide/black receiver), and a magazine capacity of 10 rounds. In the EU, Glock offers the 48 and the 43X with a rail. At least three aftermarket sources manufacture 15-round flush-fit magazines for the Glock 43X and Glock 48, which make the Glock 43X and Glock 48 match the standard capacity of the Glock 19 in a narrower pistol.
- Glock 49: In November 2023, American firearms distributor TALO Distributors announced the introduction of the Glock 49. It used the full-length Glock 47 slide and the Glock 19 frame. The slide is cut for the MOS optics option. The model is sold exclusively through TALO Distributors. Glock does not offer to sell it directly. The new model is essentially a crossover similar to the Glock 45, but in reverse. Instead of a compact slide mated to a full-grip frame, it is a full-length slide mated to a compact frame.

=== 9×21mm ===
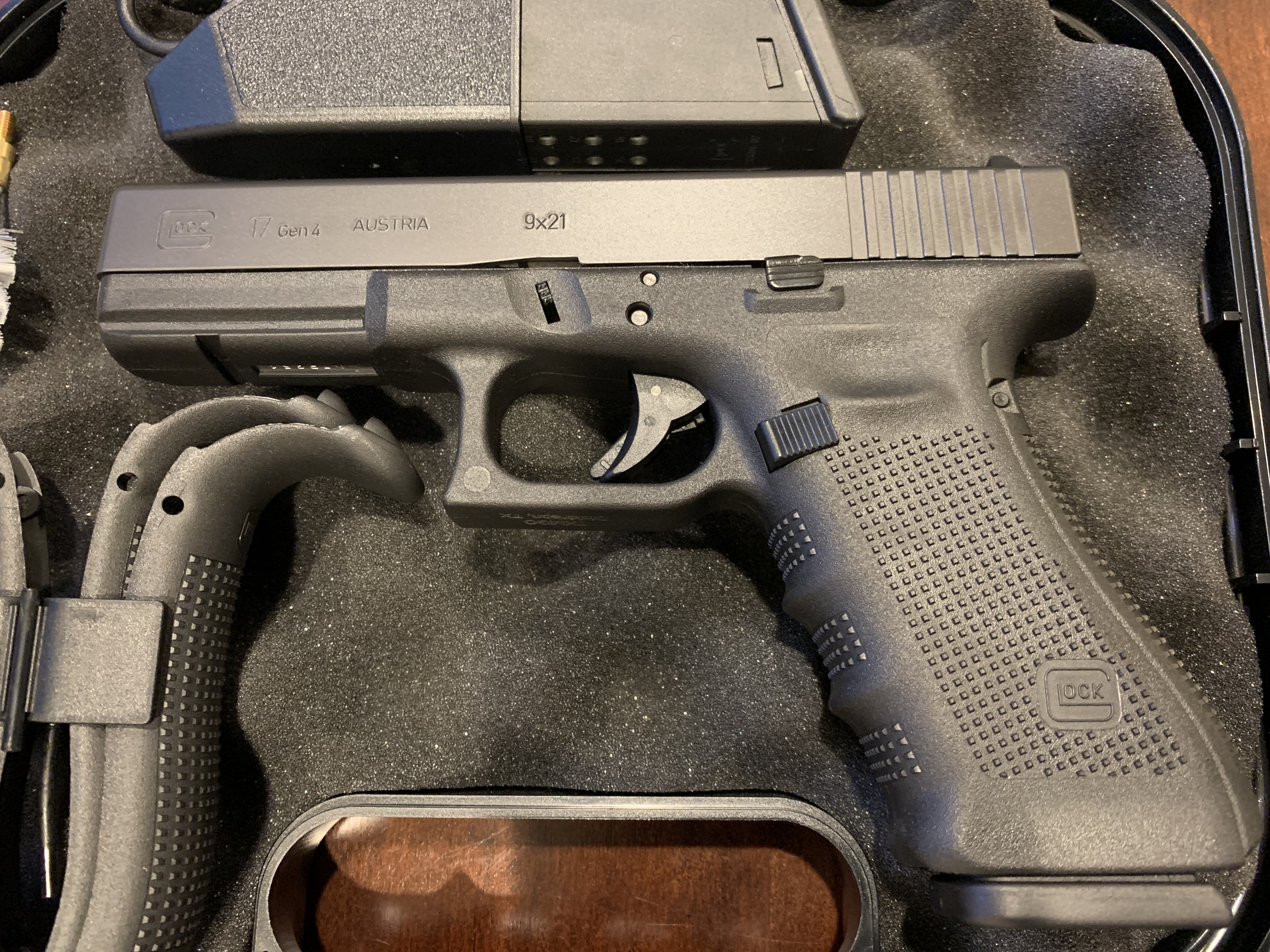
Rare within the United States, a Glock 17 chambered in 9×21mm

- The 9×21mm pistol cartridge was adopted and commercialized by Israel Military Industries for those markets (such as in France, Italy, and Mexico) (Note: Both France and Italy have since dropped this restriction.) where military service cartridges like the 9×19mm Parabellum are banned for civilian use. Glock produces 9×21mm-chambered versions of the Model 17, and other 9mm Parabellum models, for these markets. These alternative caliber versions are marked with the same model number as the 9mm Parabellum version (Note: This does not include the Glock 49, which is only being marketed to the US.) only differing in the barrel and caliber marking. Glock does not export or produce the 9×21mm pistols for the United States commercial market. This makes any 9×21mm Glock model a unique and highly desirable item for US firearm collectors. A limited number of 9×21mm Glocks have found their way into the US and are mostly held by collectors and gun enthusiasts.

=== 10mm Auto ===
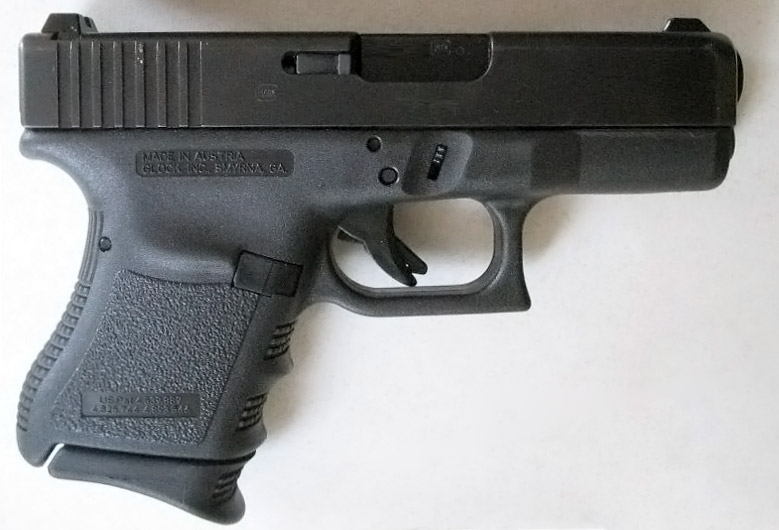
The subcompact third-generation Glock 29 in 10mm Auto

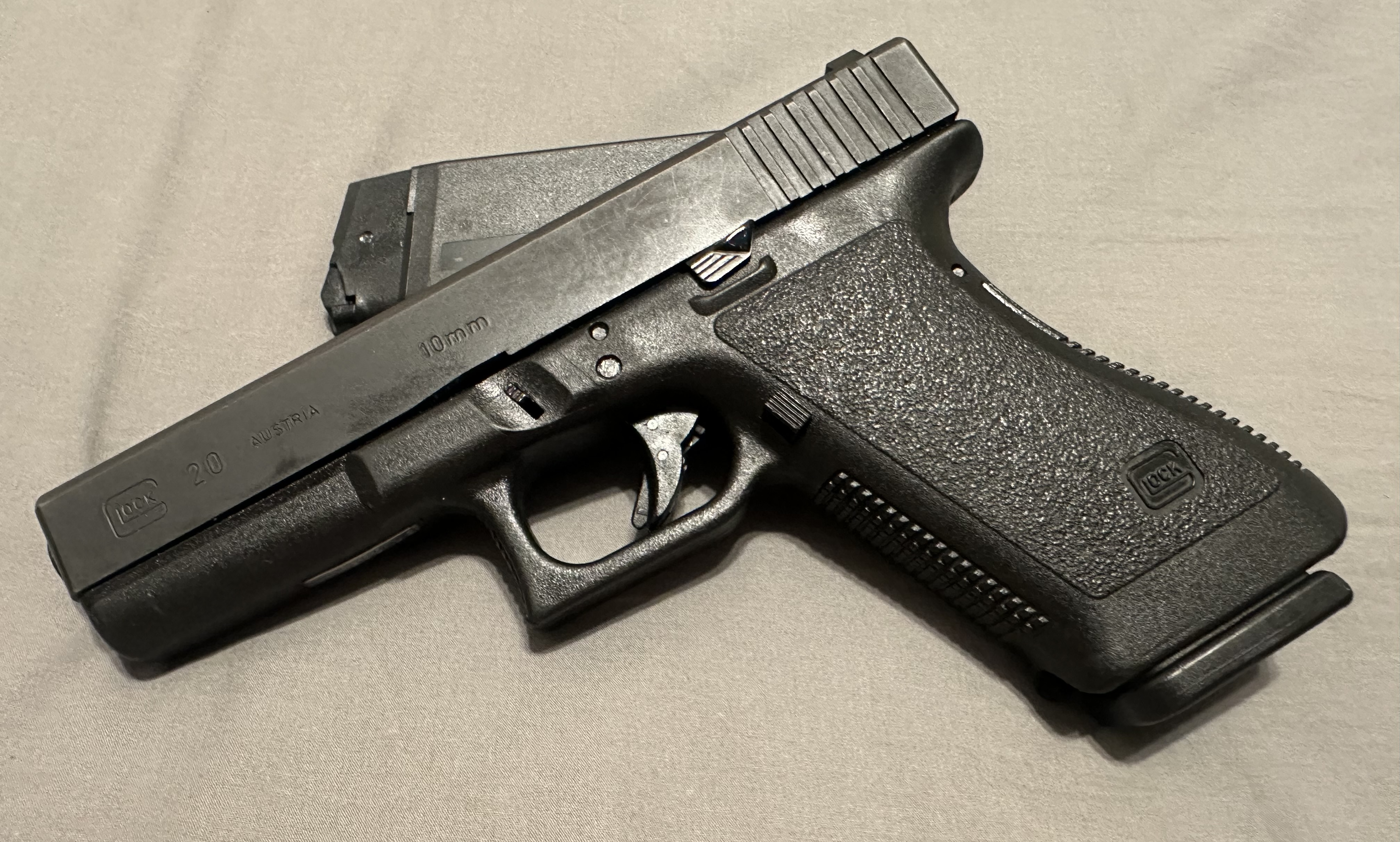
1991 Production Gen 2 Glock 20 10mm Pistol

- Glock 20: The Glock 20, introduced in 1991, was developed for the then-growing law enforcement and security forces market for the 10mm Auto. The pistol handles both full-power and reduced "FBI" loads, which have lower muzzle velocity. Due to the longer cartridge and higher pressures, the pistol is slightly larger than the Glock 17, having a roughly 2.5 mm (0.1 in) greater width and 7 mm (0.3 in) greater length. Though many small parts interchange with the Glock 17, with a close to 50% parts commonality, the major assemblies are scaled-up and do not interchange. The standard magazine capacity of the Glock 20 is 15 rounds, and there are no other factory magazine offerings. In 2009, Glock announced that it would offer a 152 mm (6.0 in)-barrel as a drop-in option.
  - Glock 20SF: The 20SF is a version of the Glock 20 that uses the Short Frame (SF) which is based on the standard G20 frame (same width), but reduces the trigger reach from the back of the grip by 2.5 mm (0.098 in) and the heel of the pistol is shortened by 4 mm (0.16 in) so the trigger can be reached and operated better by users with relatively small hands.
- Glock 29: The Glock 29 is a 10mm Auto equivalent of the subcompact Glock 26 introduced in 1997, along with the Glock 30 (.45 ACP). The pistol features a 96 mm (3.8 in) barrel and a standard magazine capacity of 10 rounds. Like other subcompact Glock pistols, the Glock 29 uses factory magazines from its full-size counterpart, offering an optional 15-round capacity.
  - Glock 29SF: The 29SF version of the Glock 29 uses the SF, which is based on the standard G29 frame (same width), but reduces the trigger reach from the back of the grip by 2.5 mm (0.098 in).
- Glock 40: The Glock 40, introduced in 2015, is a 10mm Auto equivalent of the long-slide Glock 17L. The Glock 40 is only made with the "Gen4" frame and "MOS" (Modular Optic System) configuration. The Glock 40 uses the same magazine as the Glock 20.

=== .45 ACP ===
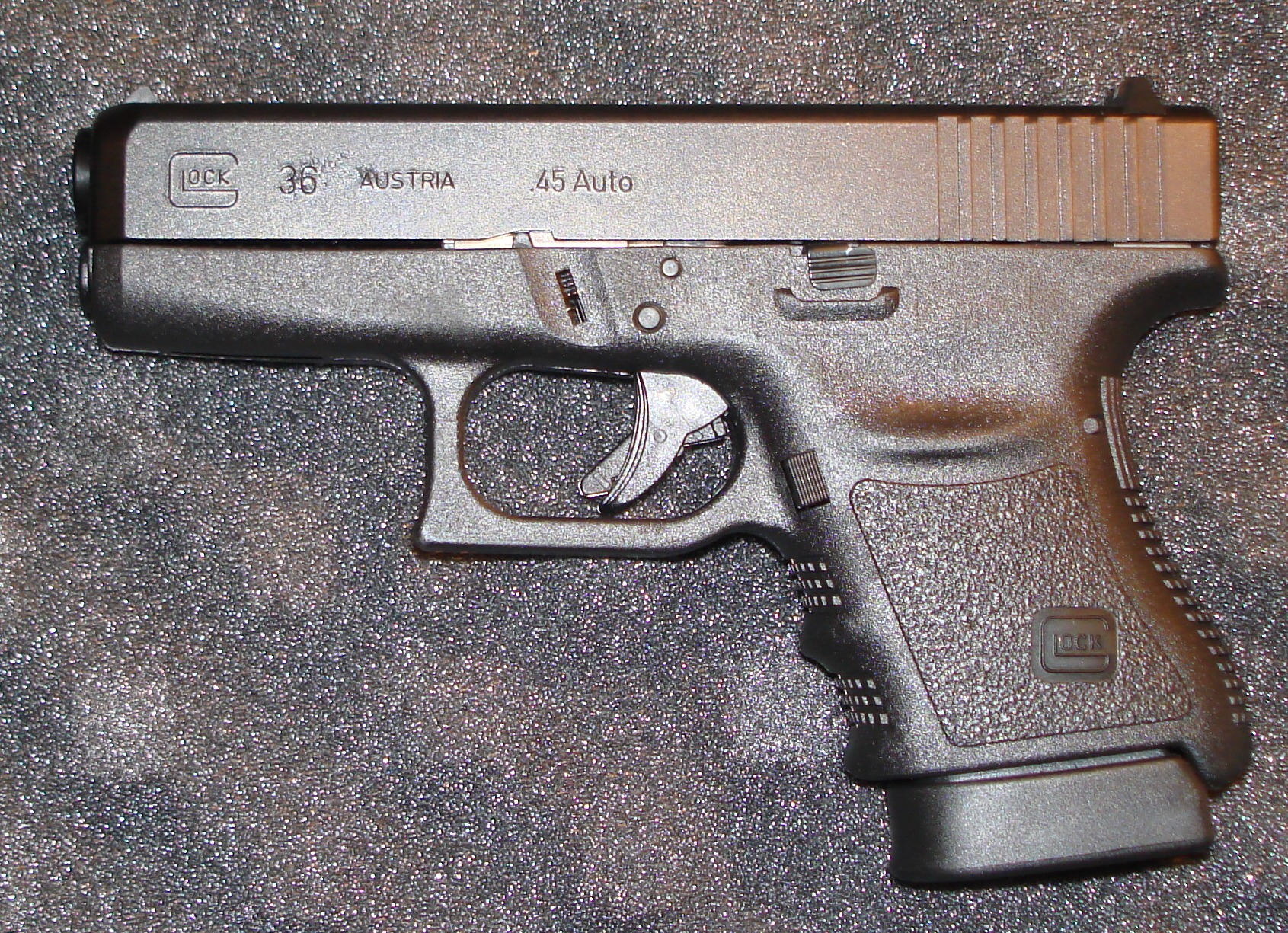
The slim-frame Glock 36 in .45 ACP

Glock pistols chambered for the .45 ACP (and the .45 GAP) feature octagonal polygonal rifling rather than the hexagonal-shaped bores used for models in most other chamberings. Octagonal rifling provides a better gas seal in relatively large diameter rifled bores, since an octagon resembles a circle more closely than a hexagon.

- Glock 21: The Glock 21 is a .45 ACP version of the Glock 20 designed primarily for the American market. Compared to the Glock 20 chambered in 10mm Auto, the slide of the Glock 21 is lighter to compensate for the lower-energy .45 ACP cartridge. The standard Glock 21 magazine is of the single-position-feed, staggered-column type with a capacity of 13 rounds. While there is no other factory magazine, a "+1" base plate is available to make the magazine 14-round. The .45 ACP Glock 21 is capable of firing .45 Super ammunition.
  - Glock 21SF: The 21SF is a version of the Glock 21 that uses a Short Frame lower which is based on the standard G21 frame (same width), but reduces trigger reach from the back of the grip by 2.5 mm (0.098 in), and the heel of the pistol is shortened by 4 mm (0.16 in) so the trigger can be reached and operated better by users with smaller hands.
- Glock 30: The Glock 30 is a .45 ACP version of the subcompact Glock 29, with a standard magazine capacity of 10 rounds. The standard magazine includes a "+1" base plate, and can be made into a 9-round magazine by swapping in a flush base plate. The factory magazine from the Glock 21, with a capacity of 13 rounds (14 rounds with the +1 base plate), will function in the Glock 30.
  - Glock 30SF: The 30SF is a version of the Glock 30 that uses a Short Frame lower, which is based on the standard G30 frame (same width), but reduces trigger reach from the back of the grip by 2.5 mm (0.098 in). The G30SF accepts the same double-stack .45ACP magazines as the G30 and G21.
  - Glock 30S: The 30S is a version of the Glock 30 that features a thin slide (same slide as the G36), a Short Frame lower, and the same double stack magazines as the Glock 30 and 21. Like the G30, G30S magazines holds 10 rounds.
- Glock 36: The Glock 36 is a "slimline" version of the subcompact Glock 30 that features an ultracompact slide and frame and is chambered for the .45 ACP cartridge. The Glock 36 is the first Glock pistol to be manufactured with a single-stack magazine, having a standard capacity of six rounds and being unique to the model. The Glock 36 cannot use factory magazines from its larger relatives due to its single-stack magazine design.
- Glock 41: The Glock 41 is a competition version of the Glock 21, much like what the G34 is in relation to the G17; it features a 5.3-inch barrel and an elongated slide. The Glock 41 is only made with the "Gen4" frame.

=== .40 S&W ===
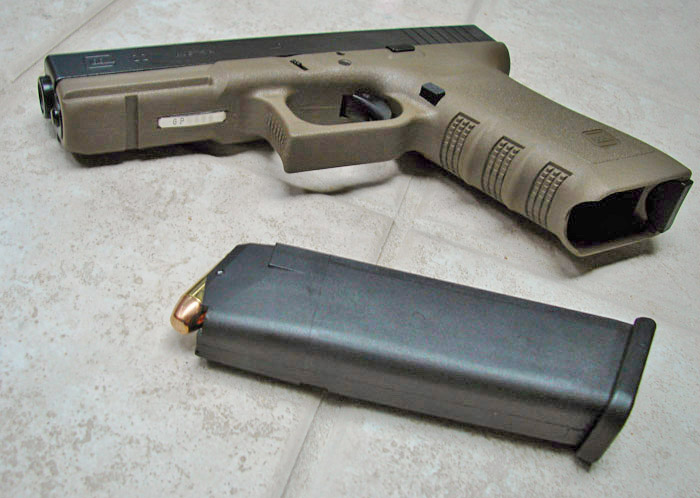
Glock 22 OD in .40 S&W with Coyote Brown frame

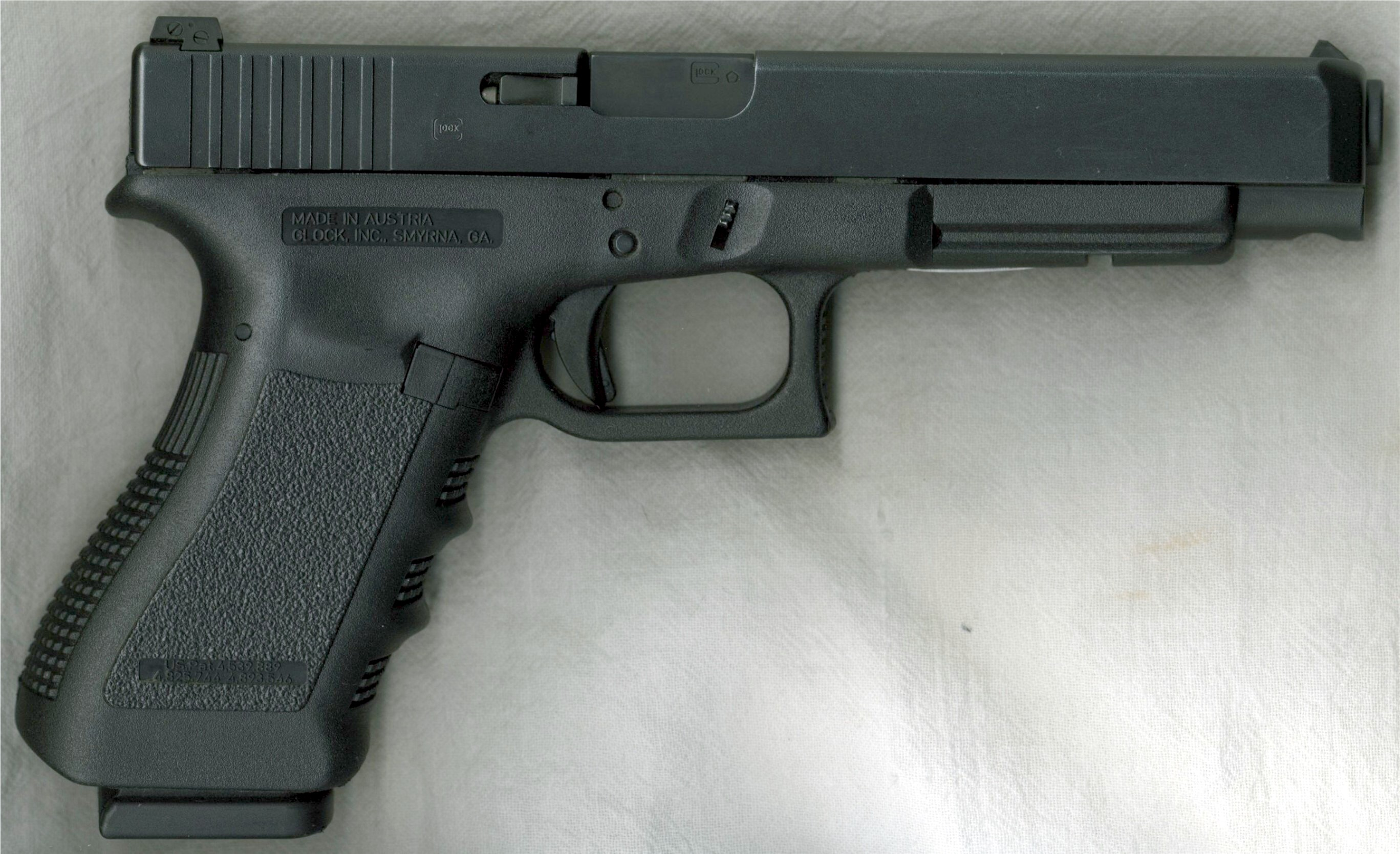
The competition-oriented Glock 35 in .40 S&W

In 1990, Smith & Wesson and Winchester developed the .40 Smith & Wesson by shortening the 10mm case. This created a round that was more powerful than the 9mm Parabellum but with more manageable recoil. The round was also still operable in the smaller frame size used for Glock 9mm models. As is typical of many pistols chambered in .40 S&W, each of the standard Glock models (22, 23, and 27) may be easily converted to the corresponding .357 SIG chambering (Glock 31, 32, and 33, respectively) simply by replacing the barrel. No other parts need to be replaced, as the .40 S&W magazines will feed the .357 SIG rounds.

- Glock 22: The Glock 22 is a .40 S&W version of the full-sized Glock 17 introduced in 1990. The pistol uses a modified slide, frame, and barrel to accommodate the differences in size and power between the .40 S&W cartridge. The standard magazine capacity is 15 rounds. A 10-round version of this magazine is also offered for those markets where the magazine capacity for handguns is restricted. Additionally, the standard magazine is available with a "+1" base plate to make it a 16-round magazine. And, there is a Glock factory 22-round extended magazine offered. One can also swap in the +1 base plate to make that a 23-round magazine. The Glock Model 22 is favored and used by multiple law enforcement agencies around the world, including the Baltimore Police Department, Los Angeles Police Department, Miami Police Department, Maryland State Police, Cumberland County Sheriff's Department (NJ), Overland Park Police Department, Kansas City Police Department, Missouri State Highway Patrol, and Alaska State Troopers in the United States; the NSW Police Force, Queensland Police Service, Western Australia Police Force, and the Northern Territory Police Force in Australia; the Edmonton Police Service, Calgary Police Service, Alberta Sheriffs Branch, Winnipeg Police Service, Toronto Police Service, Ottawa Police Service, and British Columbia Sheriff Service in Canada; and the National Bureau of Investigation (Philippines).
- Glock 23: The Glock 23 is a .40 S&W version of the compact Glock 19. It is dimensionally identical to the Glock 19 but is slightly heavier and uses a modified slide, frame, and a .40 S&W barrel, with a standard magazine capacity of 13 rounds. For jurisdictions that limit handgun magazine capacity, Glock also offers a 10-round version of the standard magazine. There is also a factory 14-round version of the standard magazine using the +1 base plate. Finally, any magazine made for the Glock 22 will work in the Glock 23.
- Glock 23C: Introduced in 1998 as part of the Generation 3 production series. This Glock 23 variant comes from the factory with two ports cut in the barrel and corresponding slide cuts. This allows gases to be ported upwards on firing, providing downward force on the muzzle. They were not as popular with law enforcement agencies as the standard 23C, but were utilised by the Fulton County Sheriff's Department, of Georgia, United States.
- Glock 24: The Glock 24 is a .40 S&W long-slide variant of the Glock 22, similar in concept to the Glock 17L. Additionally, a compensated, ported-barrel version designated the 24C was also produced. The Glock 24 was introduced in 1994 and officially dropped from the company's regular product lineup upon the release of the Glock 34 and 35. The Glock 24 can use any magazine made for the Glock 22.
- Glock 27: The Glock 27 is a .40 S&W version of the subcompact Glock 26, with a standard magazine capacity of 9 rounds. Glock also offers a 10-round version of this magazine with the +1 base plate. The factory magazines from the larger Glock 22 and 23 will fit the Glock 27, increasing capacity to 13, 14, 15, 16, or 22 rounds. Spacers are available that fit on these larger-capacity magazines themselves; they have the effect of "extending" the magazine well of the pistol, thereby improving the ergonomic feel of the pistol when the longer magazines are inserted.
- Glock 35: The Glock 35 is a .40 S&W version of the competition Glock 34. The Glock Model 35 was the service pistol for the Kentucky State Police, but by the summer of 2017, they had reverted from the Glock 35 back to 9mm weapons because of penetration improvements in the 9mm bullets, noting some officers had never been able to make the switch from 9mm to .40 S&W in the first place due to their struggles in mastering the higher caliber. The Glock 35 can use any magazine made for the Glock 22.

=== .380 ACP ===
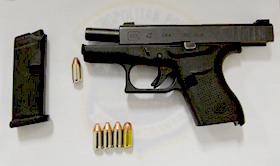
The Glock 42, chambered in .380 ACP, is currently the smallest Glock handgun produced as of 2023. The Glock 42 was also the first Glock to be entirely manufactured domestically in the United States—due to import-export restrictions from Austria to the United States market.

The first two .380 ACP models (Glock 25 and 28) were released in 1995 to provide a less powerful alternative to the 9mm Parabellum and 9×21mm, primarily intended for markets such as Brazil that prohibit civilian ownership of firearms chambered in more powerful calibers. Made in Austria, import restrictions ban civilian importation into the United States, but a limited Glock 28 run was manufactured in Glock's US plant for US sale. The Glock 25 and 28 are banned in Canada as they do not meet the minimum handgun barrel length requirements.

Due to the relatively low bolt thrust of the .380 ACP cartridge, the locked-breech design of the Glock 19 and Glock 26 was minimally modified for the Glock 25 and Glock 28 to implement unlocked breech operation. It operates via straight blowback of the slide. This required modifying the locking surfaces on the barrel and redesigning the former locking block. Unusual for a blowback design, the barrel is not fixed to the frame. It moves rearward in recoil until it is tilted below the slide, similar to the standard locked-breech system. The reduced size and mass of the Glock 42 allowed the return to the Glock-standard locked-breech design.

- Glock 25: The Glock 25 , introduced in 1995, is a blowback derivative of the compact (102 mm (4.0 in) barrel) Glock 19. The magazine capacity is 15 rounds. Standard fixed sight elevation is 6.9 mm, unlike the 6.5 mm elevation used for the 9×19mm models.
- Glock 28: The Glock 28 , introduced in 1997, is a blowback derivative of the subcompact (87 mm (3.4 in) barrel) Glock 26. The standard magazine capacity is 10 rounds, but the 15-round Glock 25 magazine will function in the Glock 28. Standard fixed-sight elevation is 6.9 mm, unlike the 6.5 mm elevation used for the 9×19mm Parabellum models.
- Glock 42: The Glock 42 , introduced in 2014, is a locked-breech "slimline" (83 mm (3.3 in) barrel) design, the smallest model Glock made. The single-stack magazine holds six rounds. US-manufactured Glock 42s may be sold for civilian use in the US.

=== .357 SIG ===
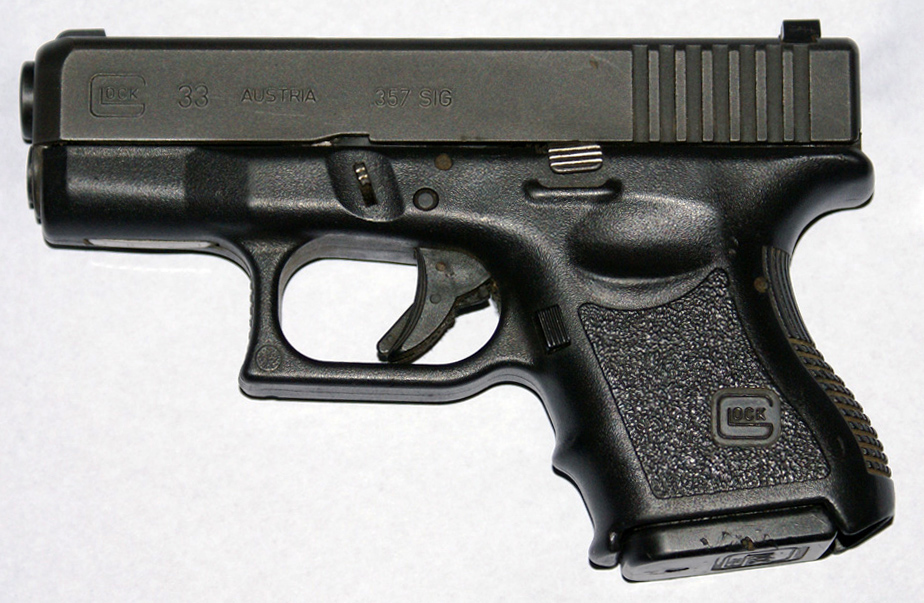
The subcompact Glock 33 in .357 SIG

In 1994, SIG and Federal developed the .357 SIG to match the ballistics of typical .357 Magnum loads. This was done by necking down a shortened 10mm case to .357, which made it easy for Glock to alter their .40 Smith & Wesson models to the new caliber. As is typical of pistols chambered in .357 SIG, each of the standard Glock models (31, 32, and 33) may be easily converted to the corresponding .40 S&W chambering (Glock 22, 23, and 27, respectively) simply by replacing the barrel. The .357 SIG magazines differ from the .40 S&W counterpart by adding an internal rib on each side of the magazine body, with cutouts for the follower. This guides the bottlenecked cartridges through the feeding process. While it is possible to load .40 S&W into these magazines, the friction causes the larger rounds to lock up inside the magazine body, which can induce malfunctions. .40 S&W magazines do not have this feature and can load both .357 SIG and .40 S&W respectively.

- Glock 31: The Glock 31 is a .357 SIG variant of the full-sized Glock 22. The standard magazine capacity of the Glock 31 is 15 rounds. It can also accept magazines intended for the Glock 22.
- Glock 32: The Glock 32 is a .357 SIG variant of the compact Glock 23. The standard magazine capacity of the Glock 32 is 13 rounds. It can also accept magazines intended for the Glock 31, Glock 22, or Glock 23.
- Glock 33: The Glock 33 is a .357 SIG variant of the subcompact Glock 27. The standard magazine capacity of the Glock 33 is 9 rounds. It can also accept magazines intended for the Glock 32, Glock 31, Glock 22, Glock 23, and Glock 27.

=== .45 GAP ===
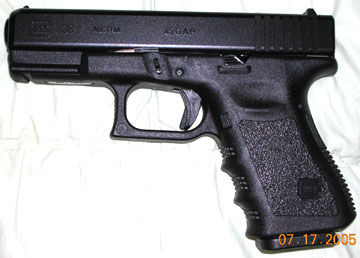
Glock 38

Glock pistols chambered for the .45 GAP (and the .45 ACP) feature octagonal polygonal rifling rather than the hexagonal-shaped bores used for models in most other chamberings. Octagonal rifling provides a better gas seal in relatively large diameter rifled bores, since an octagon will have shorter sides and shallower angles than a hexagon.

- Glock 37: The Glock 37 is a .45 GAP version of the Glock 17. It uses a wider, beveled slide, a larger barrel, and a different magazine, but is otherwise similar to the Glock 17. The Glock 37 first appeared in 2003. It was designed to offer ballistic performance comparable with the .45 ACP in the frame size of the Glock 17. The concern with the size of the Glock 20/21 has been addressed by the Glock 36, 21SF, and 30SF, all of which feature reduced-size frames. The standard magazine capacity of the Glock 37 is 10 rounds.
- Glock 38: The Glock 38 is a .45 GAP version of the compact Glock 19. The standard magazine capacity of the Glock 38 is 8 rounds, but it can use the 10-round magazines of the Glock 37.
- Glock 39: The Glock 39 is a .45 GAP version of the subcompact Glock 26. The standard magazine capacity of the Glock 39 is 6 rounds, but it can use the 8- and 10-round magazines of the Glock 37 and Glock 38.

=== .22 Long Rifle ===
- Glock 44: The Glock 44 is a .22 Long Rifle rimfire model based on the Glock 19. While the Glock 44 is similar in size to the Glock 19, it has a magazine capacity of 10 rounds and uses a simple blowback mechanism rather than the locked-breech mechanism used on nearly all other Glock pistols. The Glock 44 is lighter than the G19 at 12 ounces. It retains Glock's polygonal rifling, which Glock has tested to work with lead .22 bullets. It uses a steel/polymer composite slide due to the lower slide mass required to function with the less powerful cartridge. The 44 uses the company's proprietary "Safe Action" trigger, and of a footprint such that holsters made for the 19 or 23 are interchangeable with the 44.

== Production in other countries ==
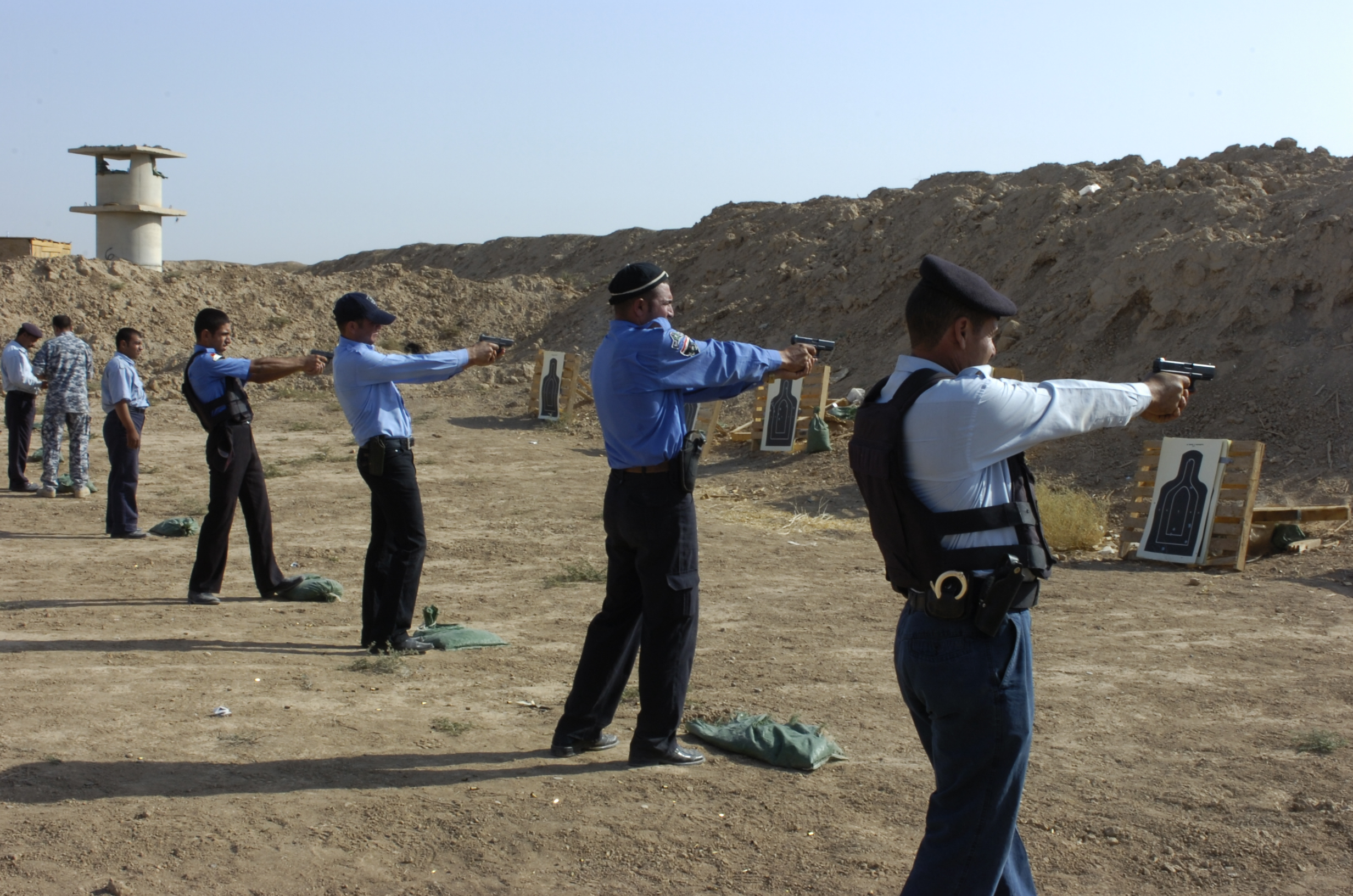
Iraqi police firing 9 mm Glock handguns at a firing range

- Russia: Russian firms such as Skat, ORSIS, and Izhmash assemble three models of Glock pistols locally: the Glock 17, 34, and 35. Efforts to have Glocks made in Russia started from 2012.
- Uruguay: As of 2015, there were plans to assemble Glock 17 pistols at army workshops in Uruguay to fulfill the needs of the national military services and law enforcement organizations.
- United States: Glock pistols are manufactured by the Glock Inc. subsidiary division located in the United States. Those batches are identical to the Austrian-made ones, but they are marked as "USA", instead of "AUSTRIA", on the slide.

== Clones ==
Third-party frames and slides for Glock pistols began to appear in the early 2000s. This has led to "Glock" becoming a generic term, including pistols not made by Glock GmbH, especially as expiring patents allowed complete Glock clones to be made. Many American companies produce Glock clones.

- China: In 2017, it was reported that Norinco was able to make a clone of the Glock 17 known as the NP-7 (or NP7). The pistol was subcontracted to Hunan Ordnance Industry Group through the Hunan Ordnance and Light Weapons Research Institute. Its features appear to be influenced by the fourth-generation Glock 17. The NP7 is marketed for export.
- Iran: Three unlicensed clones of Glock pistols made by Iranian DIO's Shahid Kaveh Industry Complex are named Ra'ad (with a safety selector, possibly an unlicensed copy of Glock 17), Glock 19 and Kaveh-17 (probably an improved Ra'ad, a variant of Glock 17S). It is not known if they could be adopted by the Iranian military to replace Browning Hi-Power, M1911 and SIG P226 pistols, and they were possibly prototypes that did not proceed to mass production.
- Myanmar: The Tatmadaw have adopted a clone of the Glock 17 known as the MA5 MK II, first reported in 2018. As of 2019 they were being manufactured for Myanmar's special forces units. The pistol has a rounded trigger guard and the Tatmadaw emblem on the grip, which has rectangular spacing instead of the smaller dot-like spacing.
- Pakistan: Unlicensed Glock clones are made in Pakistan's Khyber region, which were first reported in 2018.
- Taiwan: The 205th Arsenal in Taiwan produces a copy of the Glock 19, named the T97 pistol. The Taiwan-made Glocks were made to replace the Smith & Wesson Model 5906 used by the Taiwan police, but it ultimately did not enter service.
- Turkey: Akdal Arms produces a pistol named the Ghost TR01, which is heavily influenced by Glock pistols in its design.
- United States: Ruger produces the RXM, which uses a Glock Gen 3 compatible grip module paired with a serialized fire control unit similar in concept to the SIG Sauer P320.
- Vietnam: At the Vietnam Defence Expo 2024 in December 2024, Z111 Factory unveiled a new series of Glock clone pistols known as the SN19 (Glock 17 Gen 5), the SN19-T (Steel Frame version) and the SN7VN-M24 chambered in 7.62x25 Tokarev.

== Users ==
A map with nations who use Glock models in blue

List of users (click "show" to expand)
Country	Organization	Model
Argentina	Agrupacion de Fuerzas de Operaciones Especiales Argentine Army	17, 19X
Argentina	Brigada Especial Operativa Halcón	17, 18
Argentina	Argentine National Gendarmerie, Argentine Federal Police, Buenos Aires province police	17
Armenia	National Police of Armenia	17, 18
Australia	Royal Australian Air Force	19, 26
Australia	Australian Federal Police, Australian Border Force, New South Wales Police Force, Queensland Police Service, Western Australia Police Force, Northern Territory Police Force, Tasmania Police	17, 19, 22, 23, 26, 27, 45
Austria	Austrian Armed Forces (incl. Militärpolizei)	17 (Pistole 80), 18C, 26, 21
Austria	Bundespolizei, EKO Cobra also G18 (Min. of Interior); Justizwache (Min. of Justice)	17, 18, 19
Azerbaijan	For use with Special Military Services, 160 Glock pistols were purchased in 2013.	19
Bangladesh	Ordered by Bangladesh Army	26
Bangladesh	Used by SWAT of Bangladesh Police	17
Brazil	Polícia Federal - Federal Police	17, 19, 26
Brazil	Polícia Rodoviária Federal – Federal Highway Police	17, 17 MOS, 26
Brazil	Polícia Militar do Estado de São Paulo - Military Police of São Paulo State	22
Brazil	Polícia Civil do Estado de São Paulo - Civil Police of São Paulo State	22
Brazil	Polícia Militar do Estado do Rio de Janeiro - Military Police of Rio de Janeiro State	23
Brazil	Polícia Militar do Estado do Espírito Santo - Military Police of Espírito Santo State	17, 22
Brazil	Polícia Militar do Estado da Bahia - Military Police of Bahia State	22
Brazil	1º Batalhão de Forças Especiais	17, 21
Canada	Ontario Provincial Police (OPP); Quebec Provincial Police – Sûreté du Québec (SQ); Winnipeg Police Service Tactical Support Team; Royal Canadian Mounted Police	17, 17M, 19, 26, 35, 45
China	SWAT units	17, 19, 26
Czech Republic	601st Special Forces Group; nonstandard sidearm issued on international deployments	17
Czech Republic	Police of the Czech Republic, mainly special units	17
Denmark	Sirius Dog Sled Patrol, Greenland	20
East Timor	Timor-Leste Defence Force	23
East Timor	National Police of Timor-Leste	19
Ecuador	National Police, Various special police units such as the GOE and GIR	17
Estonia	Police and Border Guard Board	19
Estonia	Estonian Special Operations Force	19
Finland	Finnish Defence Forces	17 (as 9.00 PIST 2008)
Finland	Finnish Police, primary service firearm; Border Guard (Ministry of Interior)	17, 19, 26
Finland	Criminal Sanctions Agency, Dept. of Corrections (Vankeinhoitolaitos) (Ministry of Justice)	—
France	French Armed Forces	17, 17 MOS, 19, 26, 34
Georgia	Mainly used by GSOF and some MIA units. Became standard issue for Georgian Ministry of Internal Affairs forces in October 2021.	17, 21, 26
West Germany: (until 1991) /Germany	Kampfschwimmer of the Bundeswehr, G17 issued under designation P9.	17
West Germany: (until 1991) /Germany	Federal and State Police, tactical units (GSG 9, SEKs); Customs (ZUZ) - G17, G19, G26.	17, 19, 26
West Germany: (until 1991) /Germany	State Police in Saxony-Anhalt - about 8,600 G46 TR, standard-issue firearm.	46
Greece	Ειδική Κατασταλτική Αντιτρομοκρατική Μονάδα (EKAM) unit of the Hellenic Police	21
British Hong Kong (until 1997) /Hong Kong	Hong Kong Police Force (incl. special units SDU, CTRU, ASU, SBDIV), ICAC, C&E Dept.	17, 19
Iceland	Iceland Crisis Response Unit (Ministry of Foreign Affairs)	—
Iceland	Icelandic National Police, Víkingasveitin units (Ministry of Interiour)	—
India	Standard Issue side arm for special forces Para (SF) (Army), MARCOS (Navy), National Security Guard (Min. of Home Aff.).	17, 26
India	Andhra Pradesh Police	19X
Indonesia	Indonesian National Armed Forces (Army, Navy, Air Force)	17, 18, 19, 23, 26, 27, 34, 42
Indonesia	Indonesian National Police	17
Iraq	Iraqi security forces - military and law enforcement forces (purchased 125,163 pistols)	19
Israel	Israel Defense Forces, Israel Police	17, 19
Japan	Security Police of Tokyo Metropolitan Police Department; Special Assault Team; Osaka Prefectural Police with Glock 45 since 2025	17, 19, 45
Jordan	Royal Guard	—
Kosovo	Kosovo Police, Kosovo Security Force	17, 19
Latvia	Latvian Military, standard-issue pistols with Land Forces.	17, 19, 21, 26
Lithuania	Lithuanian Armed Forces	17
Lithuania	Lithuanian Police	17, 19, 26
Luxembourg	Luxembourg Army	17
Luxembourg	Unité Spéciale de la Police of the Grand Ducal Police	17, 26
Malaysia	Malaysian Armed Forces	17, 19, 34
Malaysia	Malaysia Coast Guard (MMEA); Royal Malaysia Police (Ministry of Home Affairs)	17, 18, 19, 26, 34
Malaysia	Royal Malaysian Customs (Ministry of Finance)	17, 19, 26, 43
Mexico	Armada de México (Navy)	17
Moldova	Fulger Battalion	17
Monaco	Compagnie des Carabiniers du Prince	17
Montenegro	Armed Forces of Montenegro, standard military sidearm.	17
(Post-independence Burma (1948–1962)) Tatmadaw Government (1988–2011) / Myanmar	Used by Myanmar Army and the Myanmar Police Special Task Force. Manufactured locally as MA-1 MK-II.	MA5 MK II
Netherlands	Military of the Netherlands; Royal Marechaussee (Min. of Defence) BSB sections Persoonsbeveiliging (PB), Observatie Team (OT) and Sky Marshals also use Glock 26.	17, 18, 26
Netherlands	Dutch Police, standard-issue firearm of the Dienst Speciale Interventies.	17
New Zealand	New Zealand Defence Force	17
New Zealand	New Zealand Police (an "unarmed service", but are trained to use firearms)	17
Norway	Norwegian Armed Forces	17 (P-80, P-80NM1, P-80NM2)
Pakistan	In use with Special Service Group units	17, 19, 26
Philippines	Armed Forces of the Philippines, Philippine Army, Philippine Marine Corps MARSOG, Presidential Security Group (joint service unit)	17, 21
Philippines	National Intelligence Coordinating Agency, Philippine Drug Enforcement Agency (Office of President)	—
Philippines	National Bureau of Investigation (Dept. of Justice); Philippine National Police (DILG)	17
Peru	Peruvian Air Force, Peruvian Army, Peruvian Navy, Dirección Nacional Antidrogas.	17
Poland	Polish Armed Forces	17
Poland	Border Guard; Polish Police (Ministry of Interior and Admin.)	17, 19, 26
Portugal	Portuguese Army; Portuguese Marine Corps; Maritime Police; Military Judiciary Police; (Ministry of National Defence)	17
Portugal	Guarda Nacional Republicana; Polícia de Segurança Pública; Foreigners and Borders Service; Municipal Police; (Ministry of Internal Administration)	19, 19X
Portugal	Judiciary Police; Prison Guard; (Ministry of Justice)	19, 26
Romania	Romanian Armed Forces	17, 17L, 19
Russia	Special Operations Forces	17, 26
Russia	Federal Security Service (FSB); Ministry of Internal Affairs (MVD), special forces	17, 19
Serbia	Police of Serbia	17, 19, 21, 35
Singapore	Singapore Police Force; Prison Service (Ministry of Home Affairs)	19
Slovakia	5th Special Operations Regiment (Slovakia)	17
Slovakia	Slovak Police Force	17
Spain	Unidad Especial de Intervención (UEI) group of Spanish Civil Guard, Special Naval Warfare Force, Army's Special Operations Command	17, 19, 43
Sweden	Swedish Armed Forces	17 (Pistol 88, 88C, 88C2), 19 (Pistol 88B, 88D)
Sweden	Swedish Police Authority	45
Sweden	Swedish Customs	19
Switzerland	Swiss Armed Forces: Military Police, Swiss Grenadiers, ARD 10, FSK-17	17, 26
Switzerland	Police (Gendarmerie) Cantonal of Geneva	19
Taiwan	Various criminal investigation bureaus outside major cities	19
Thailand	Royal Thai Police at least 2,238 G19, G17 used by Arintharat 26, Naresuan 261 units. G17 and G19 used by Royal Thai Army	17, 19
Timor Leste	National Police of East Timor	19
Tunisia	Unité Spéciale – Garde Nationale	17, 34
Turkey	Used by Special Forces Command.	17, 19
Ukraine	Ukrainian Armed Forces	17
Ukraine	Department of Security Police in the Kyiv region	17, 19
United Kingdom	British Armed Forces	17 (L131A1), 17L (L132A1), 19 (L137A1)
United Kingdom	Specialist Firearms Command of the Metropolitan Police	17, 17M, 19, 19M, 26
United Kingdom	Police Scotland	17
United Kingdom	Police Service of Northern Ireland	17, 19
United States	USSOCOM; MARSOC; United States Navy SEALs; Delta Force	19, 19M, 26
United States	U.S. Customs and Border Protection; United States Coast Guard (Dept. of Homeland Security); U.S. Secret Service	19, 26, 47; 19
United States	Federal Bureau of Investigation; Bureau of Alcohol, Tobacco, Firearms and Explosives; Drug Enforcement Administration (Dept. of Justice)	17M, 19, 19M, 22, 23, 27
United States	Alaska State Troopers	22
United States	Baltimore City Police Department	17, 22
United States	Colorado State University Police Department	17, 19
United States	Florida Highway Patrol	37 Gen 4, 39
United States	Kansas Highway Patrol	17
United States	Kentucky State Police SRT Trigg County Sheriff's Office	27, 35
United States	New York City Police Department; New York State Police; New York State University Police	17, 19, 21, 22, 23, 27
United States	New Jersey State Police; Port Authority Police Department	19
United States	South Carolina Highway Patrol	17M
United States	Dallas Police Department	17, 19, 45
United States	Douglas County Sheriff's Department, Douglas County Oregon	18
United States	Marine Corps Embassy Security Group	19
United States	Houston Police Department	17, 19, 22, 26, 27, 43
Uruguay	Uruguayan National Army	17
Vatican City	Swiss Guard	19
Vatican City	Gendarmerie of Vatican City	17
Venezuela	Venezuelan Armed Forces	17
Vietnam	Mobile Police	19
Yemen	Military of Yemen	19

== Criminal use ==
Glock pistols have been used in numerous high-profile criminal incidents in the United States. Mass shootings involving Glock pistols include the 1991 Luby's shooting, the 2007 Virginia Tech shooting, the 2011 Tucson shooting, the 2012 Aurora theater shooting, the 2012 Sandy Hook Elementary School shooting, the 2015 Charleston church shooting, the 2016 Pulse nightclub shooting, the 2018 Pittsburgh synagogue shooting, and the 2022 New York City Subway attack. Notable single-victim killings include the 1996 murder of Tupac Shakur. In February 2020, stuntwoman Cheryl Wheeler-Dixon and her husband Robert Reed Sanders were killed with a Glock pistol by her ex-husband in Yellow Springs, Ohio, in an incident where both sides were armed with Glocks; a grand jury determined the shooting was a justifiable homicide after investigators found evidence the couple had driven from North Carolina intending to murder him. In June 2022, Ilene Steur, a survivor of the 2022 NYC subway attack, sued Glock and its Austrian parent company for compensation for her physical injuries and emotional pain.

Glock pistols have also been used in mass shootings elsewhere in the world, including the 2001 Nepalese royal massacre, the 2002 Erfurt massacre, the 2002 Nanterre massacre, the killings committed by Viktor Kalivoda in 2005, the 2011 Norway attacks, the 2012 Bucharest hair salon shooting, the 2016 Munich shooting, the 2023 Rotterdam shootings, the 2023 Prague shootings and the 2025 Graz school shooting.

A 2014 report by the Chicago Police Department found that Glock pistols were the third most traced handgun, coming after those from Smith & Wesson and Sturm, Ruger & Co. Experts on gun control, mass shootings, and defense training have cited factors such as reliability, ease of use, and commonness for why Glock pistols are so often involved in mass shootings and other criminal acts. The criminal use of handguns, including Glocks, has led to calls for increased gun control in the United States. This common usage, however, has been described by Paul M. Barrett to be a result of Glock's overall popularity and market presence in the US and that "this level of violence isn't necessarily tied to a particular[,] to a brand".

Glock pistols were singled out for restriction by some jurisdictions. They were branded the "hijacker's special" based on the false assumption that they could bypass airport metal detectors because of their polymer frame. This was refuted in Congressional hearings by the ATF, FAA, and other organizations responsible for airline security, which proved embarrassing for the ban's advocates and provided significant publicity for Glock.

In December 2024, the states of Minnesota and New Jersey sued Glock over the design of the 9-millimeter semiautomatic pistol, claiming that the company had failed to make changes to prevent the easy conversion of the pistol into an illegal and much more dangerous machine gun. The conversion is done using a small, illegal device known as a Glock switch.

On October 10, 2025, California Governor Gavin Newsom signed Assembly Bill 1127 into law, prohibiting the retail sale of new semi-automatic handguns that can be readily converted to fully automatic fire using Glock switches. The law primarily affects Glock pistols and similar designs featuring a cruciform trigger bar, and has been described as a "Glock ban." The law aims to address a perceived design flaw allowing illegal modifications, with proponents hoping to pressure manufacturers like Glock to redesign their firearms in the interest of public safety. The National Rifle Association and other gun advocacy groups filed a federal lawsuit challenging the statute soon after.

== See also ==
- Glock GmbH
