= Kathrin Glock =

Austrian entrepreneur and animal rights activist (born 1980)

- Born: Kathrin Tschikof; 26 November 1980 (age 45); Carinthia, Austria
- Occupations: Animal rights activist; entrepreneur
- Spouse: Gaston Glock (m. 2011; died 2023)

Kathrin Glock (née Tschikof; born 26 November 1980) is an Austrian entrepreneur and supporter of animal welfare.

== Life ==
Kathrin Glock was born and raised in Carinthia, Austria. In July 2011, she married Gaston Glock.

== Career ==
Since 2010, Kathrin Glock has been responsible for the Glock Horse Performance Center. Members of the GLOCK Team include dressage world champions Edward Gal, Hans Peter Minderhoud, and Nicole Werner, as well as the show jumping equestrian Gerco Schröder.

In 2012 Glock became a board member of Glock GmbH. She is also part of the IGG Private Foundation and donor of the Gaston and Kathrin Glock Private Foundation. She is also part of the medical advisory board of the Glock Health, Science and Research GmbH and chairwomen of the CSR Advisory Board of Glock Ökoenergie. She was also a supervisory board member of AustroControl, the Österreichischen Gesellschaft für Zivilluftfahrt mit beschränkter Haftung (ACG).

Since 2010, Glock has been responsible for the international standing of the two riding centres in Austria and the Netherlands. This encompasses horse breeding, horse racing, and organisation of international tournaments.

For the GHPC Austria, Glock is mainly involved in the organisation of a series of international horse racing events called Horses & Stars. Austria's only 5-star-horse racing events take place in the GHPC Austria.

In November 2019 Glock accepted the Ladies of Year Award for Glock Ökoenerige in her function as chairwoman of the CSR Advisory Board.

== After Gaston Glock's death ==
Gaston Glock died on 27 December 2023 at age 94. Following his death, Kathrin Glock assumed a leading role at Glock GmbH as chairwoman of the company. A 2026 Vanity Fair investigation by Simon Akam reported that Gaston Glock's three children from his first marriage to Helga Glock learned of their father's death through media reports and did not attend his memorial service, and that succession of the company passed to Kathrin rather than to the children.

In November 2024, Glock announced the wind-down of the company's international equestrian sponsorship program and the closure of the Glock Horse Performance Center in Oosterbeek, the Netherlands, which had been the training base for dressage riders Edward Gal and Hans Peter Minderhoud. Kathrin Glock stated that the decision to end the international sponsorship had been made by Gaston Glock in 2022 and was implemented gradually under her leadership, with the sponsored horses retired to the GHPC facility in Austria.

== Animal welfare ==
Glock is a supporter of animal welfare and a vegan. She supports the animal sanctuary Gut Aiderbichl in Henndorf, as well as smaller animal welfare organisations, and non-profit organizations such as the Ronald McDonald House Charities.

Since 2017, the Gaston and Kathrin Glock Private Foundation has been prize donors of the Kärntner Tierschutzpreis, which awards events, associations and private individuals for their achievements in animal protection.

== Awards ==
- 2013: Leading Ladies Award, in the category health and social engagement
- 2016: LOOK! Business Award in the category marketing & brand management
- 2016: Special prize of the Bundestierschutzpreis of the Austrian department for health and women, presented by secretary Sabine Oberhauser
- 2018: Leading Ladies Award, in the category social engagement for animal rights
