= Paul Jannuzzo =

American lawyer and business executive

Paul F. Jannuzzo
- Born: Paul Francis Jannuzzo
- Education: Villanova University (BA); Vermont Law School (JD)
- Occupations: Lawyer; Former gun industry executive

Paul Francis Jannuzzo is an American lawyer and business executive. He is the former CEO of Glock, Inc. (subsidiary of Glock GmbH).In 2012, Jannuzzo was convicted of theft by conversion and violating Georgia's Racketeer Influenced and Corrupt Organizations Act. The Georgia Court of Appeals reversed both convictions on July 9, 2013, ruling that the prosecution had failed to prove that the charges were brought within the applicable statues of limitation.

== Career ==
Jannuzzo was hired in 1991 to be the General Counsel of Glock Inc., the American subsidiary of Glock Ges.m.b.H. He was later promoted to be COO, CEO and Vice President. He left the company in February 2003.

== Legal issues ==
According to the testimony of Peter Manown who was a Vice President at the company, Manown and Jannuzzo set up a scheme to embezzle from the company. Manown confessed to Gaston Glock and cooperated with the prosecution of Jannuzzo.

In 2009, Jannuzzo fled the country first to Mexico, and then Amsterdam, where he was later arrested and extradited to the US for prosecution.

Jannuzzo was found guilty of racketeering by the trial court in Cobb County, Georgia, and faced up to 30 years in prison. He was sentenced to 7 years in prison, and 13 years of probation. Jannuzzo said he was the victim of a vendetta.

Both convictions were overturned on appeal for exceeding the statute of limitations, but did not address the merits of the original embezzlement charges.

In an interview, Robert Glock, the son of Gaston Glock, said that the company was aware that Jannuzzo had the gun and wanted to return it, but that he did not testify on Jannuzzo's behalf on the advice of lawyers, and to avoid putting his father in a difficult position.
