= Gaston Glock =

Austrian engineer-inventor-businessman (1929–2023)

- Born: 19 July 1929; Vienna, Austria
- Died: 27 December 2023 (aged 94); Klagenfurt, Carinthia, Austria
- Occupations: Engineer; business executive
- Known for: Founder of Glock GmbH
- Title: Managing director of Glock
- Spouses: Helga Glock (m. 1962; div. 2011) Kathrin Tschikof (m. 2011)
- Children: 3

Gaston Glock (German: [ˈɡastɔn ˈɡlɔk]; 19 July 1929 – 27 December 2023) was an Austrian engineer and businessman. He founded the company Glock in 1963. When he entered the 1980 competition for a new Austrian service pistol, he hired two engineers who had worked on the development of HK's first two polymer-frame pistols, the VP70 and P9 models. The first Glock pistol, chambered in 9x19mm and named the Glock 17 because of it being Gaston Glock's 17th patent, and not because it holds 17 rounds, entered Austrian military and police service in 1982. It became one of the most influential and popular handguns of the 20th century, leading to a succession of other models in a variety of sizes and chamberings as well as an industry-wide trend toward polymer-frame, striker-fired pistols.

== Early life ==
Glock was born in Vienna on 19 July 1929. He had not handled a gun since he was conscripted into the Wehrmacht as a teenager near the end of World War II, after which he graduated from school as an engineer and joined a hand drill company.

== Manufacturing ==
Glock began as a manufacturer of curtain rods in the 1960s, and knives for the Austrian military using a Soviet-era metal press in the 1970s, and did not design or manufacture a firearm until he was 52 years old. He already had experience with polymers from his previous business ventures. In 1980, he bought an injection-moulding machine to manufacture handles and sheaths for the field knives he was making for the Austrian army in his garage workshop. His earliest employees were from the camera industry and experienced in producing polymer components. His first production pistol was the Glock 17. It took one year to design and produce, and he applied for its Austrian patent in April 1981.

Robert McFadden of The New York Times wrote that Glock's pistol:

[...] became a phenomenal seller, especially in the United States. It arrived in the mid-1980s, when crime rates were soaring and police officers felt outgunned. New models and calibers with extended clips [sic] were introduced. Two-thirds of America's police forces, including New York City's, adopted the Glock, as did many federal, state and county agencies ... He [Glock] was vilified by gun-control advocates and hailed by gun aficionados. Despite the Glock's popular depiction as a criminal's weapon and its use in some of America's most spectacular mass shootings, Mr. Barrett, the author of Glock, said the gun had not commonly been traced to crime scenes — indeed, far less so than other firearm brands.

== Murder attempt ==
In July 1999, Glock suspected that Charles Ewert, one of his closest financial advisers, had been embezzling funds. Glock confronted Ewert, who hired a French mercenary to murder Glock with a rubber mallet in a car park in an attempt to make it look like an accident. Glock was hit in the head, but was able to fight back, punching the man until he collapsed on top of Glock. Both Ewert and the assassin were convicted of attempted murder and sent to prison.

== Personal life ==
Glock married Helga Glock in 1958, and they co-founded the family business in 1963. The Glocks had three children, Brigitte, Gaston Jr., and Robert. They divorced in 2011 and entered litigation over accusations that Glock engaged in racketeering. The lawsuit was dismissed in 2017. Glock married his second wife, the fifty one years younger Kathrin Tschikof, in 2011.

Glock donated over €1 million to Austrian charities. He also gave funds to the Freedom Party of Austria. Glock was described as a "reclusive Austrian billionaire" who avoided publicity and valued his privacy despite his famous invention.

Glock died on 27 December 2023, at the age of 94.
