= Glock GmbH =

Austrian light weapons manufacturer

- Type: Private (GmbH)
- Industry: Arms industry
- Founded: 1963; 63 years ago
- Founder: Gaston Glock
- Headquarters: Deutsch-Wagram, Lower Austria, Austria
- Products: Firearms; Knives; Entrenching tools Apparel; Horse care products
- Number of employees: 1,325 (2015)
- Website: www.glock.com

Glock GmbH (doing business as GLOCK) is an Austrian light weapons manufacturer headquartered in Deutsch-Wagram, Austria, named after its founder, Gaston Glock. The company makes popular polymer-framed pistols, but also produces field knives, entrenching tools, various horse related products, and apparel.

== Products ==
=== Handguns ===
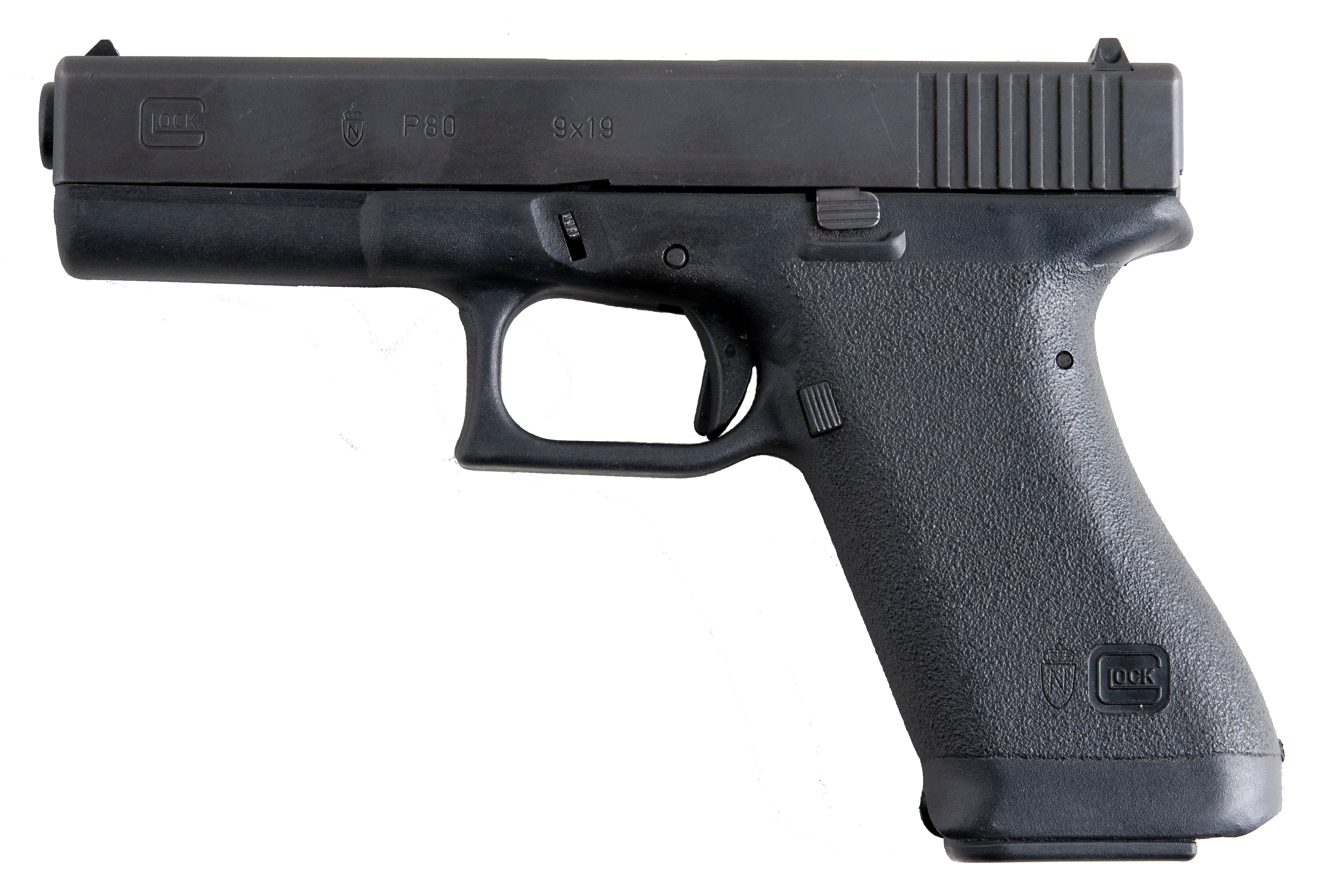
Original Glock 17 issued by the Norwegian military

Glock handguns are common sidearms among law enforcement agencies and military organizations around the world, and are also popular weapons for home defense, and concealed/open carry. They are reputed to be highly reliable, able to function under extreme conditions and available in a wide range of ammunition types (9mm, 10mm, .40 S&W, .45 ACP, .45 GAP, .357 SIG, .380 ACP, and .22 LR). Third-party conversion kits for .400 Corbon, .40 Super, and .50 GI are also available. The simplicity of the Glock design as well as its simple operation contributes to its reliability, as it contains a relatively small number of components (nearly half as many as the typical handgun, each one interchangeable requiring no hand-fitting) making maintenance and repair easier and less costly. In December 2019, Glock introduced their first production-model .22-caliber pistol, the Glock 44.

The polymer frame makes them lighter than typical steel or aluminium-framed handguns, an attractive feature for police officers and citizens who carry firearms for extended periods of time. The trigger is the only operating element; all three safeties are deactivated when the trigger is pulled, and automatically activated when it is released. Glock pistols have no manual safeties like other brands' external safety, often in the form of a lever or button. The only external controls aside from the trigger are the slide stop lever, the magazine catch, and the slide lock for disassembly. This adds to the simplicity of use and removes a potential source of error while operating the handgun under stress. Most of the steel components in a Glock pistol are treated with a nitriding process called Tenifer, which hardens the surface and makes the pistol resistant to corrosion and wear.

Though the Heckler & Koch VP70 was the first polymer-framed pistol and predated the Glock 17 by 12 years, the popularity of Glock pistols inspired other manufacturers to begin production of similar polymer-framed firearms, including the Walther P99, Smith & Wesson Sigma, HS2000 (Springfield Armory XD), Steyr M, Taurus PT 24/7, Caracal, FN Herstal FNP and Ruger SR9 pistols.

In addition to their semi-automatic handguns, Glock also produces a select-fire pistol, the Glock 18, which has both semi-automatic and fully automatic mode. This model is generally available only to law enforcement or military organizations and the details of its production are obscure. Conversion kits for other Glocks to be fired in fully automatic mode exist, but they are third-party, and they are specifically marked as Title 2 devices by the U.S. Bureau of Alcohol, Tobacco, Firearms, and Explosives – restricting their purchase and possession to ATF 3 licensed dealers in the US.

In October 2025, Glock announced that it would be ceasing production over 30 variants of its handguns. The decision was cited by Glock as a streamlining and "right-sizing" measure; but was also prompted by passage of legislation in the United States against pistols that can be easily converted to fully automatic fire (through the use of a Glock switch or other means). Only four models will remain in production, all of which are single-stack compact variants that are both popular sellers and do not suffer from the same convertibility concerns: models Glock 42, 43, 43X and 48X. Glock plans to replace the discontinued models in December with "V" designations after the model numbers, which will feature redesigned trigger bars and rear plates designed to prevent the use of full-auto switches.

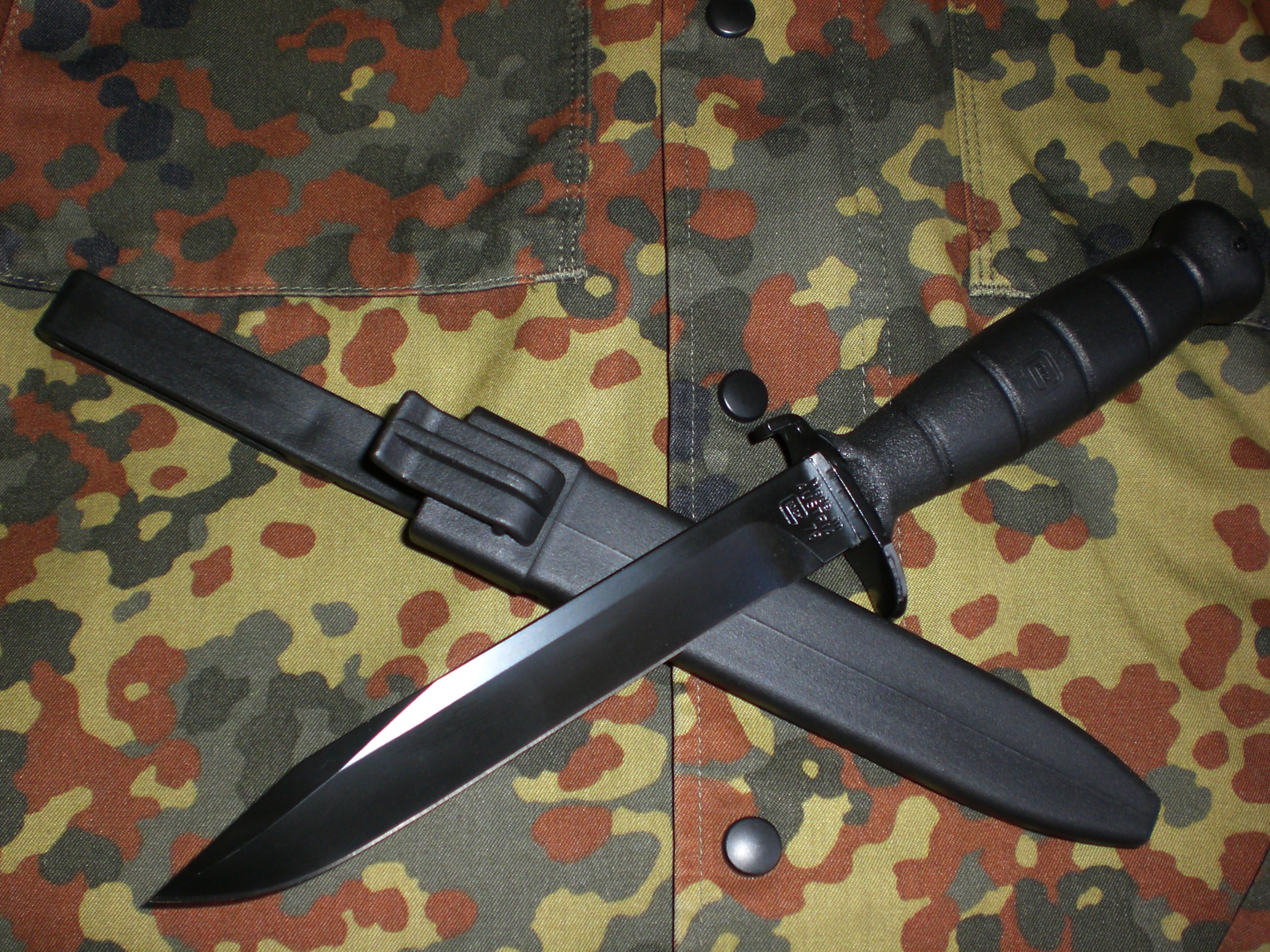
Glock FM 78 knife

=== AR-15 style rifles ===
The GR-115 is the first AR-15 style rifle made by Glock.

=== Other ===
In addition to handguns, Glock also produces field knives, entrenching tools, various horse related products, and apparel.

== Subsidiaries ==
Glock international subsidiaries are:

Subsidiary	Country
Glock America N.V.	Uruguay
Glock, Inc.	United States
Glock Middle East FZE	United Arab Emirates
Glock do Brasil S.A.	Brazil
Glock s.r.o. (Slovakia)	Slovakia
Glock International S.A.	Panama

== Embezzlement ==
Glock has twice been the target of embezzlement schemes involving high-ranking officers of the company or others closely related to the company. In 1999, Charles Ewert attempted to have Gaston Glock murdered after Glock asked for a meeting regarding an accusation of embezzlement. Ewert was convicted of attempted murder along with an accomplice for his involvement.

In April 2012, Paul Jannuzzo, the former CEO of US subsidiary Glock, Inc., was convicted of racketeering regarding his involvement in an embezzlement scheme against the company.

Investigations in the Ewert embezzlement case exposed questionable financial dealings by Ewert and a complicated ownership structure hidden behind a string of shell companies in favourable tax locations around the world.

== Legacy ==
Glock handguns are used by armed forces and law enforcement organizations worldwide, including most law enforcement agencies in the United States.

Glock has clearly made their mark on the world, making it one of the most recognizable handguns. As such, many forms of media feature Glocks or Glock-inspired pistols, such as video games, film and TV.

Glock handguns are popular in some countries for personal protection and practical shooting. The company sponsors a competitive shooting team that travels worldwide.
