= Entrenching tool =

Digging tool

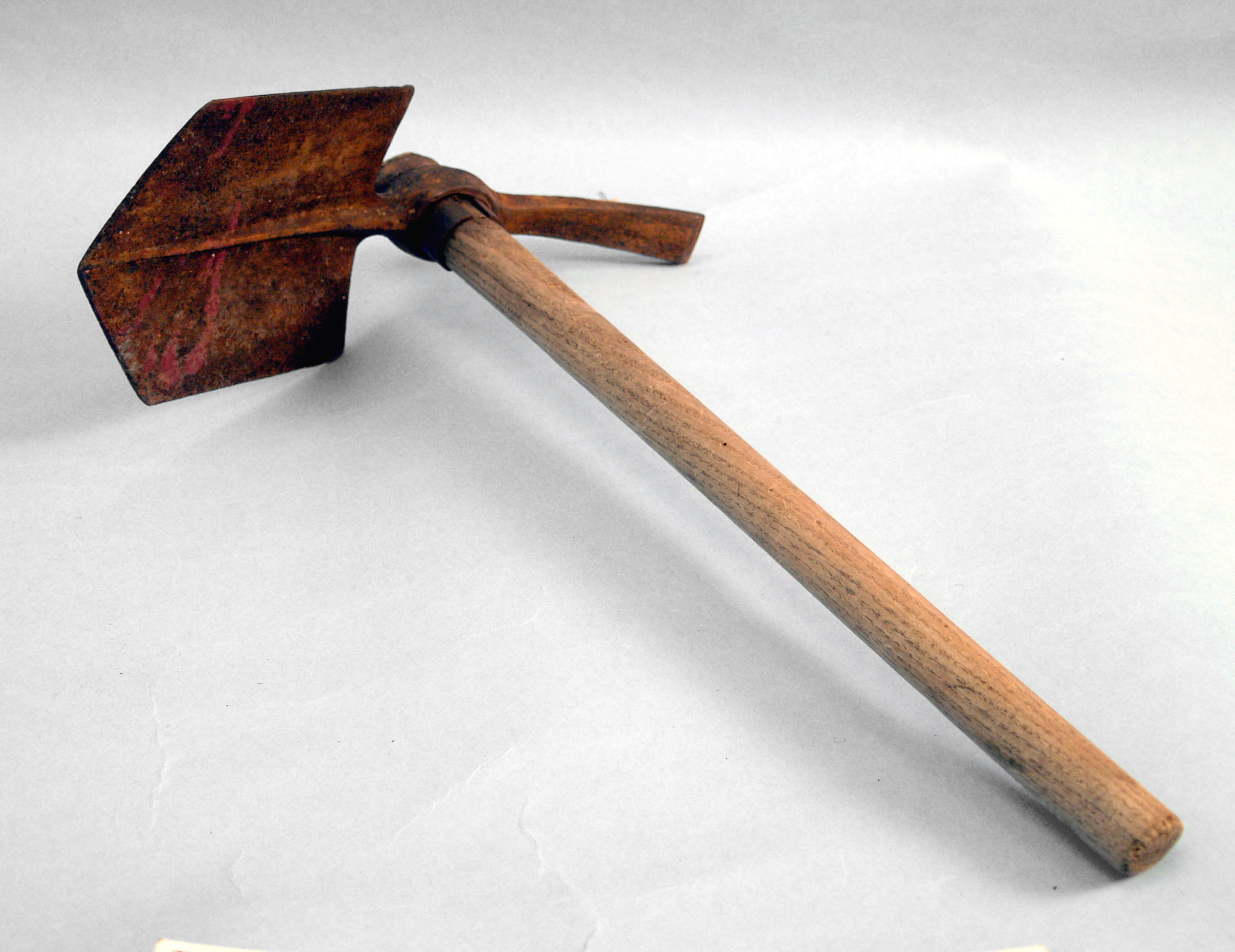
World War I era entrenching tool

An entrenching tool (UK), intrenching tool (US), E-tool, or trenching tool is a digging tool used by military forces for a variety of military purposes. Survivalists, campers, hikers, and other outdoor groups have found it to be indispensable in field use. Modern entrenching tools are usually collapsible and made using steel, aluminum, or other light metals.

== History and development ==
Entrenching tools go back at least to the times of the Roman Legion who used a type of mattock known as a dolabra. Julius Caesar, as well as other ancient writers, documented the use of spades and other digging implements as important tools of war. The Roman Legion when on the march would dig a ditch and rampart fortified with mobile stakes around their camps every night where established camps were not available.

Siege tactics throughout history required the digging of fortifications and often mining of walls was attempted, where saps were dug to a wall's foundation, and collapsing the wall was attempted.

In more modern times the siege tactics of the Napoleonic Wars used spades and pickaxes as entrenching tools to dig trenches towards the walls of the fortifications being besieged, to allow men and munitions to get close enough to fire cannons at the walls to open a breach. Being too long and heavy to be transported by individual soldiers, entrenching shovels and spades were normally carried in the supply carts (logistics train) of a military column; only pioneer or engineer troops typically carried spades or shovels as part of their individual equipment. This frequently led to situations in which the infantry did not have access to entrenching equipment when it was needed. As one US army infantry officer noted, "the intrenching tools of an army rarely get up to the front until the exigency for their use has passed."

== Trowel bayonet ==
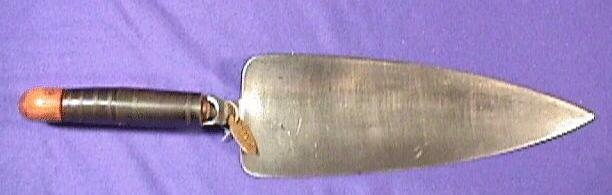
US Bayonet Model 1873 Trowel

In 1870, the U.S. Army introduced the trowel bayonet, intended for individual soldiers as both a weapon and an entrenching tool. This was followed by the development of separate trowel and spade tools, small one-hand implements that could be carried as part of a soldier's individual equipment. While the entrenching trowel or spade gradually gave way in the United States and other modern armies to larger, heavier, and more effective entrenching tools, the concept of supplying each infantry soldier with a means of digging his own entrenchments or breastworks continued as a tactical doctrine.

== Modern era ==
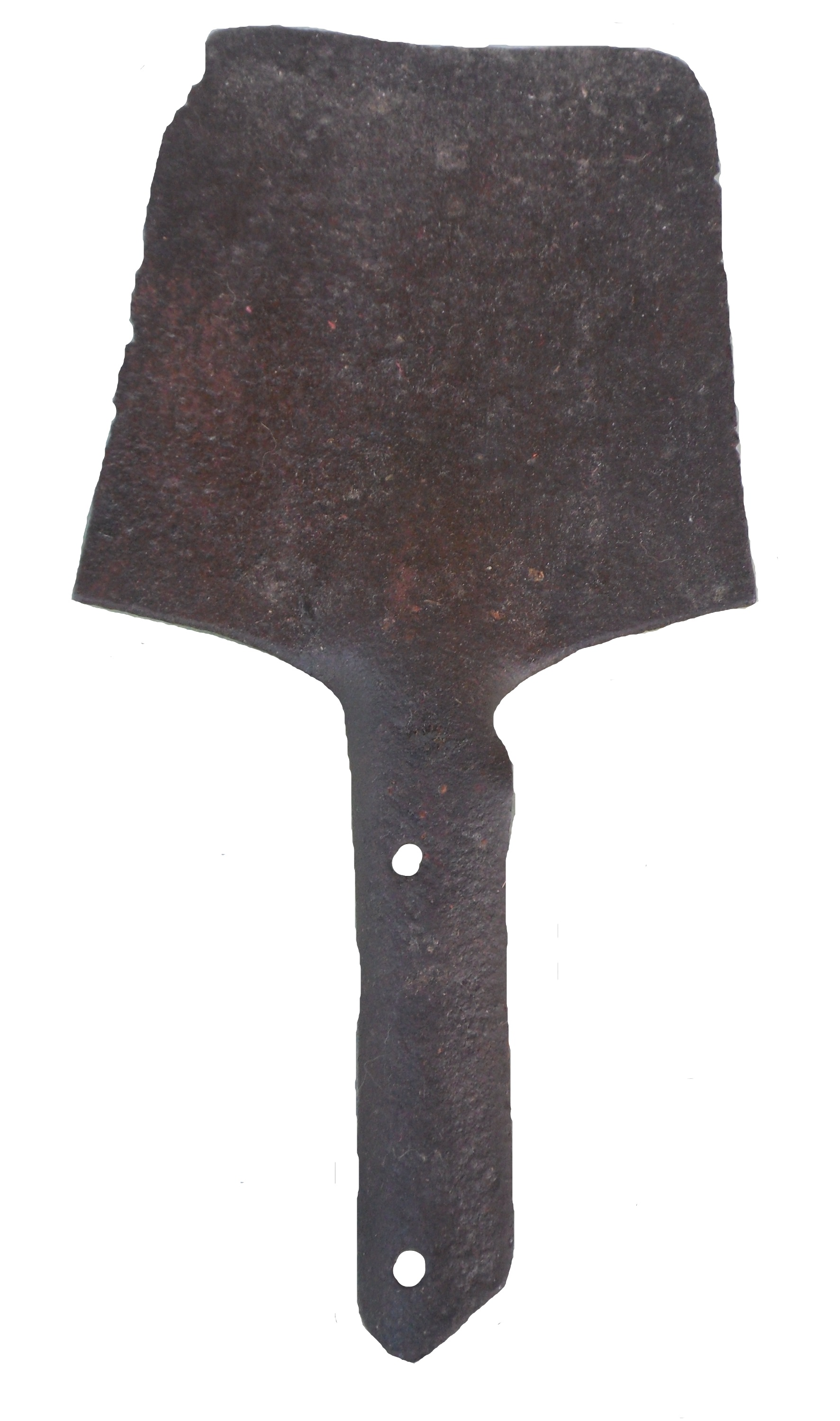
Linnemann shovel from WWI (Romania)

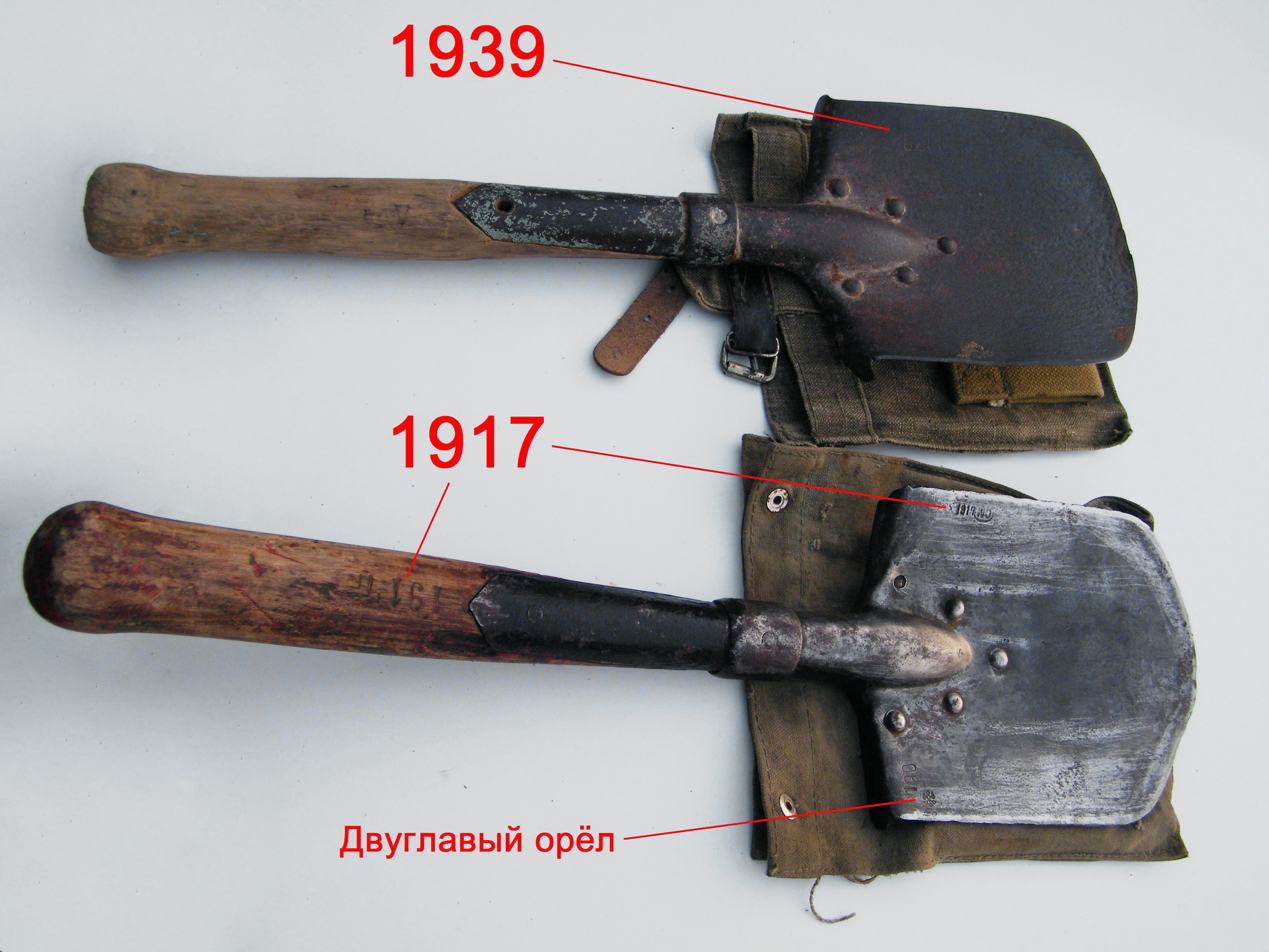
World War I and II era Russian MPL-50 (malaya pekhotnaya lopata – small infantry spade) are similar to the entrenching tools used by most armies participating in those conflicts.

The first truly modern entrenching tool was invented in 1869 by the Danish officer Johan Linnemann (infanteriofficer). In 1870, it was patented and supplied to the Danish Army. The next year it was adopted by the much bigger Austrian Army, and Linnemann founded a factory in Vienna to produce his spade. It was later introduced to Germany, France, Romania, and Russia, though only Russia recognized Linnemann's patent rights, and paid him 30,000 rubles and ordered 60,000 spades. The Russians called it the MPL-50 (small infantry spade that is 50 cm (20 in) in length) and still use it to this day. This little spade can also be used as an axe, a hammer, an oar, or as a frying pan for cooking food.

== World War I ==
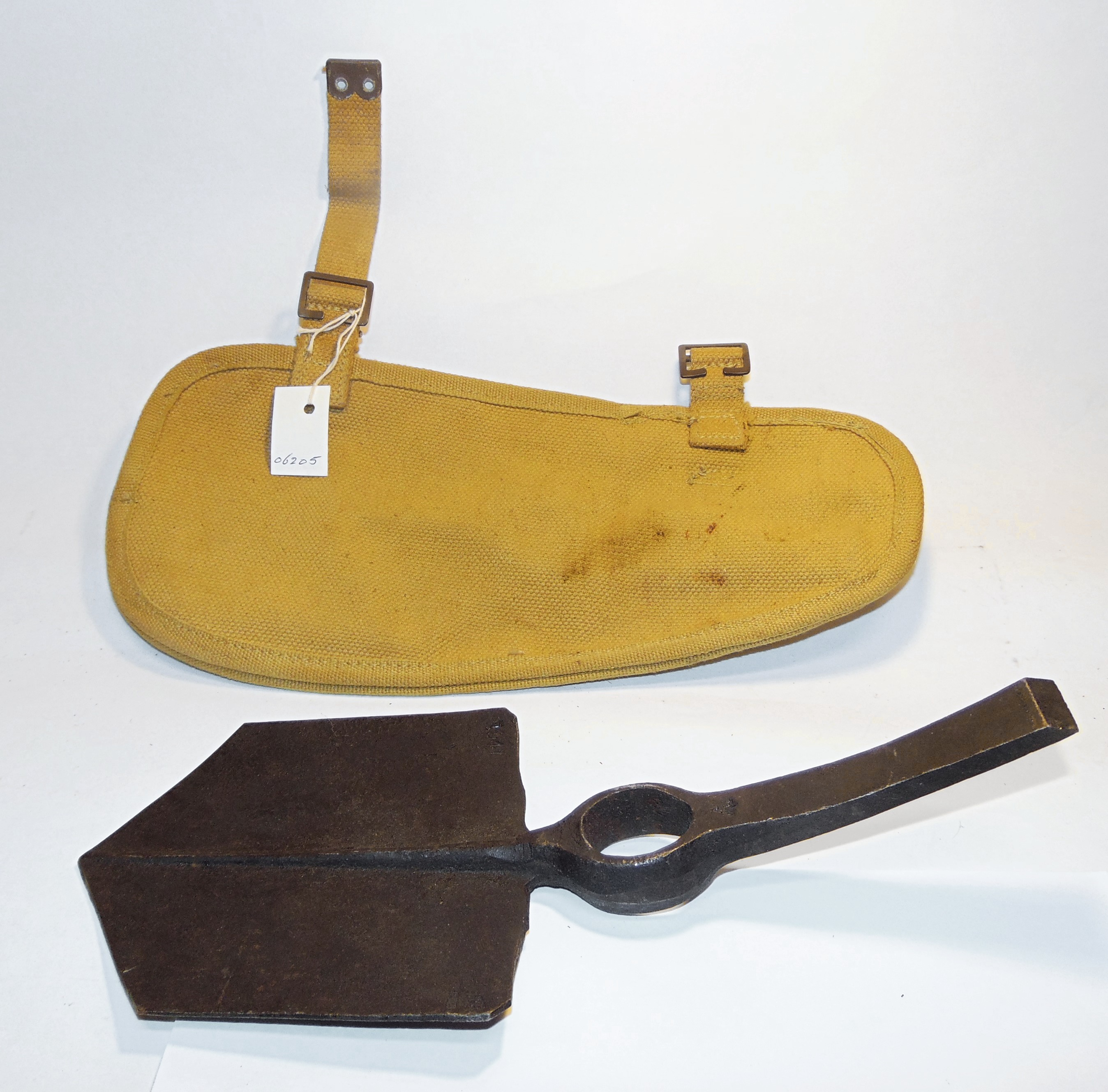
Spade, British military standard issue entrenchment tool, with loose shank and holder, 1941

During World War I, entrenching tools became extremely important with the introduction of trench warfare. Entrenching tools designed for the individual infantryman soon appeared with short straight handles, T-handles, D-handles, and other designs.

The British entrenching tool of this period was a two part design, with a metal head and a wooden handle, the metal head consisted of an adze or spade blade and a pick axe spike, used alone the head could be used as a spade with the pick spike serving as a handle. Between the blade and the spike was a ring into which the handle could be inserted at right angles to the head, with the handle inserted the tool could be used as a pick mattock. Besides being used for digging defensive fighting positions, entrenching tools were used for digging latrines and graves.

During World War I, the entrenching spade was also pressed into service as a melee weapon. In the close confines of a trench, rifles and fixed bayonets were often too long for effective use, and entrenching tools were often used as auxiliary arms for close quarters combat. (In Nancy Mitford's 1945 novel, The Pursuit of Love, there hangs over the chimney-piece an entrenching tool "with which, in 1915, Uncle Matthew had whacked to death eight Germans one by one as they crawled out of a dug-out. It is still covered with blood and hairs, an object of fascination to us as children.") From 1915, soldiers on both sides routinely sharpened the edges of entrenching shovels for use as weapons.

== World War II folding designs ==
"In 1938, the (German) Klappspaten foldable spade, appeared, being the precursor of all modern spades of this kind, including the 1943 American copy." Folding designs became increasingly popular, usually consisting of a fixed handle with a folding shovel head, and sometimes incorporating a pick into the design. Like all individual entrenching tools, they were designed to be easily carried as part of an infantry soldier's standard pack equipment.

The British 1937 Pattern entrenching tool added a bayonet lug to the tool's handle, allowing the Lee-Enfield spike bayonet to be mounted on the end and converting the tool into a mine prodder.

Entrenching tools, if strongly built, can also be used as ancillary weapons. Some entrenching tools can be even sharpened on one or both sides of the blade to be used as cutting tools or weapons; in fact, when used as such, the tool's sharp, thick edges are strong enough to cut through flesh and bone. During the Second World War, entrenchment tools were used in close quarters combat between German and Soviet forces, notably in the brutal hand-to-hand fighting during the Battle of Stalingrad.

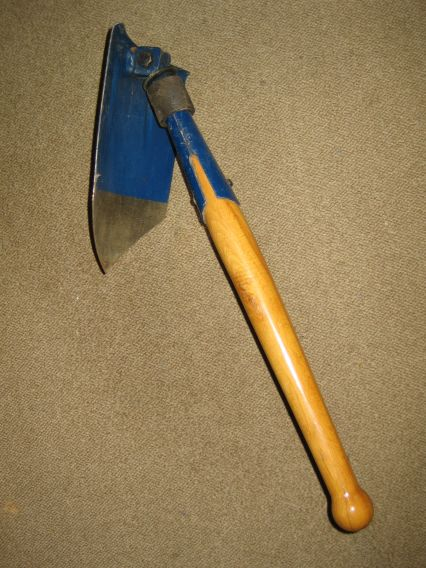
The World War II era German Klappspaten folding spade would set the trend for all future designs.

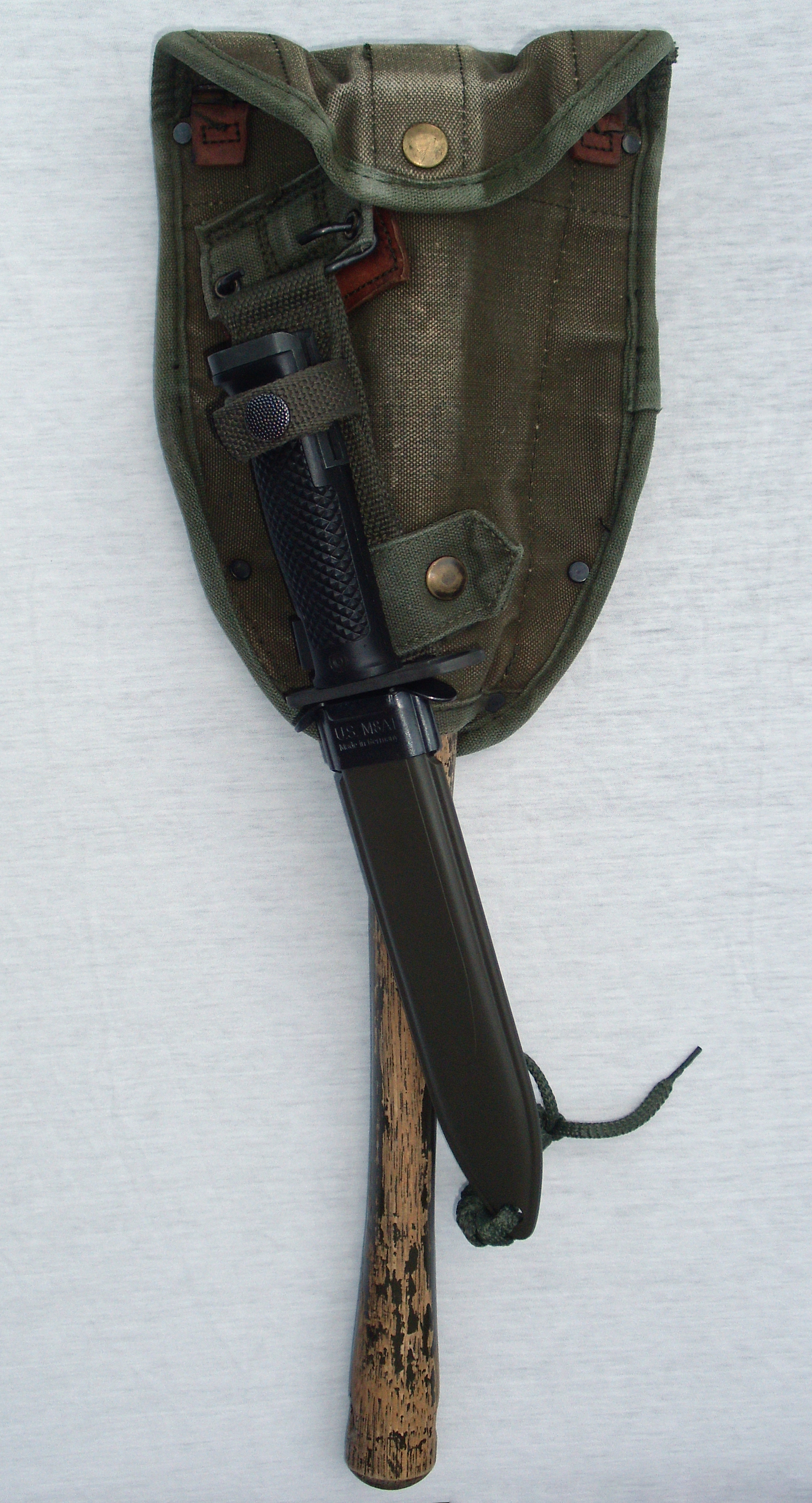
M-1956 Intrenching Tool Carrier with M8A1 Scabbard, carrying M6 bayonet, attached

== Contemporary ==
The United States Army entrenching tool has evolved since the time of the Pattern 1907 non-folding T-handled spade to a tri-fold design with a modified “D” handle design with all steel construction, to a similar light weight plastic and steel tri-fold design adopted by NATO as the standard issue entrenching tool. Other folding variants have also been issued. The latest light weight plastic tri-fold design is thirty percent lighter than the all-steel trifold was: 1.5 pounds (0.68 kg) instead of 2.25 pounds (1.02 kg).

The Glock Feldspaten (field spade) features a hardened metal spade blade that can be locked in three positions for digging, shoveling, and chopping, and a telescopic handle made out of fiberglass-reinforced nylon containing a 175 mm (6.9 in) long hardened metal sawblade. The entrenching tool weighs 650 g (23 oz) and fully extended is 630 mm (25 in) long. The spade and handle can be collapsed and shortened for easy transport and storage into a 260 mm × 150 mm × 60 mm (10 in × 6 in × 2 1/2 in) package.

Soviet Spetsnaz units were well trained in the use of the standard short-handled Russian entrenching shovel ("saperka") as a weapon; by the nature of their missions, such tools were only rarely used for digging or entrenching positions. Modern commando forces, too, are trained to fight with entrenchment tools.

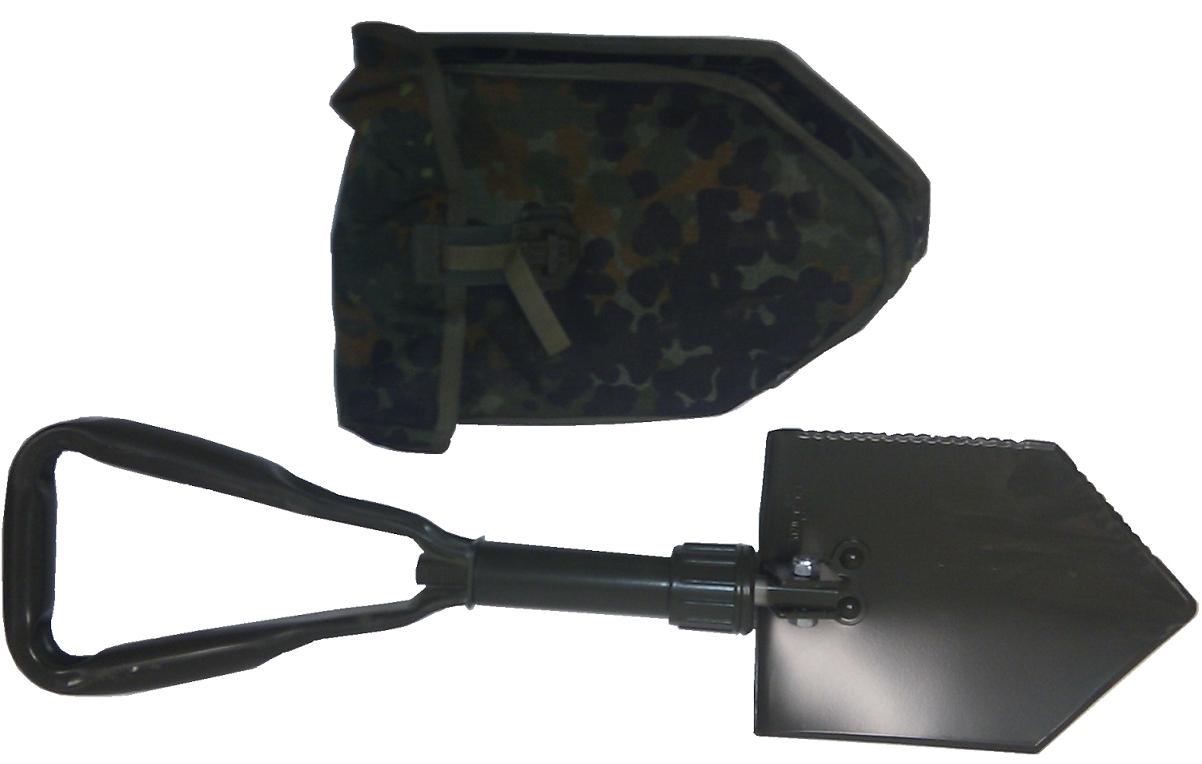
Modern all steel tri-folding E-Tool with D-handle

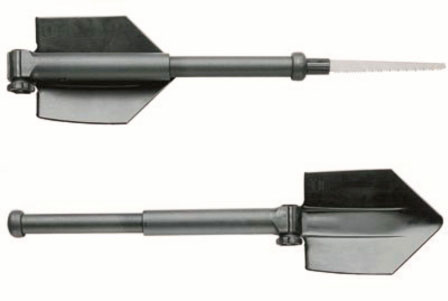
Glock Feldspaten entrenching tool. Note: plastic telescoping handle and saw blade.

== Civilian use ==
Many millions of surplus entrenching tools have made their way into the hands of civilians. They are commonly used for camping, gardening and by war re-enactment groups. Some people collect the older issue entrenching tools as military memorabilia.

== See also ==
- Batillum, an ancient Roman precursor
- Dolabra, an ancient Roman pickaxe
