= Johann Sahulka =

Austrian electrical engineer

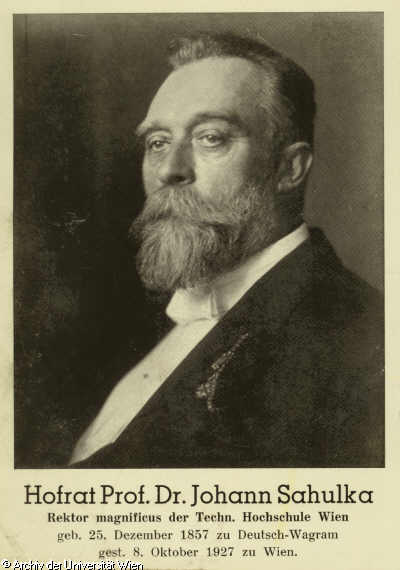
Johann Sahulka.

Johann Sahulka (born 25 February 1857, Deutsch-Wagram - 8 October 1927, Vienna) was an Austrian scientist and professor of electrical engineering at Vienna University of Technology. He discovered that mercury arcs act as a rectifier.

== See also ==
- Mercury-arc valve
