= MPL-50 =

Small Russian infantry spade

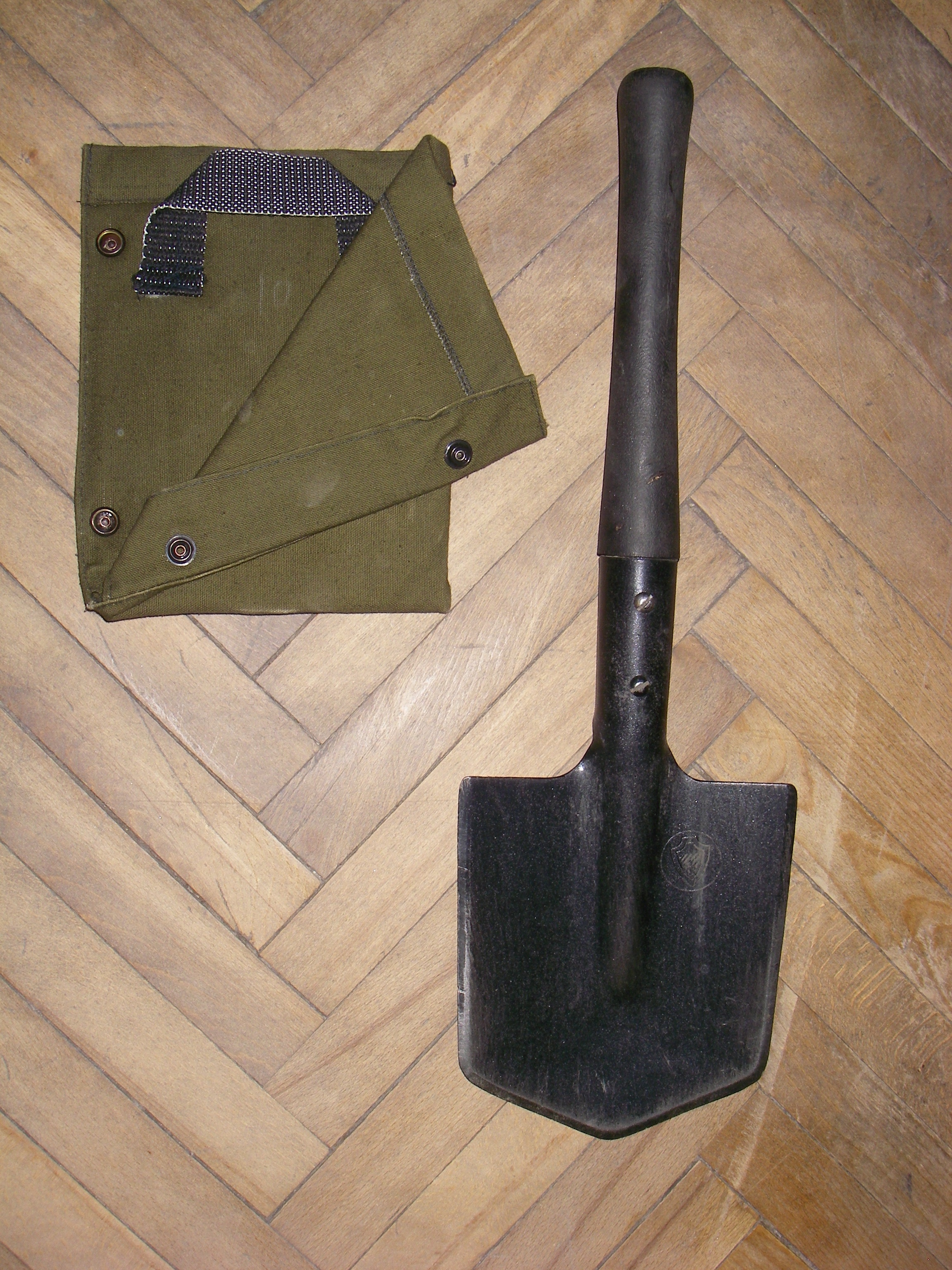
- Post-WWII design. The blade cover to the left allows the MPL-50 to be worn on the belt in a blade-up manner.
- Type: Entrenching tool
- Place of origin: Denmark; Russia

Service history
- In service: 1870-today
- Used by: Russia; Post-Soviet successor states
- Wars: Russo-Turkish War; World War I Russian Civil War; Polish-Soviet War; World War II; Soviet-Afghan War; Chechen Wars; Russo-Ukrainian War

Production history
- Designer: Mads Johan Buch Linnemann
- Designed: 1869
- Produced: 1869-today

Specifications
- Length: 500 millimetres (20 in)
- Height: 800 grams (1.8 lb)

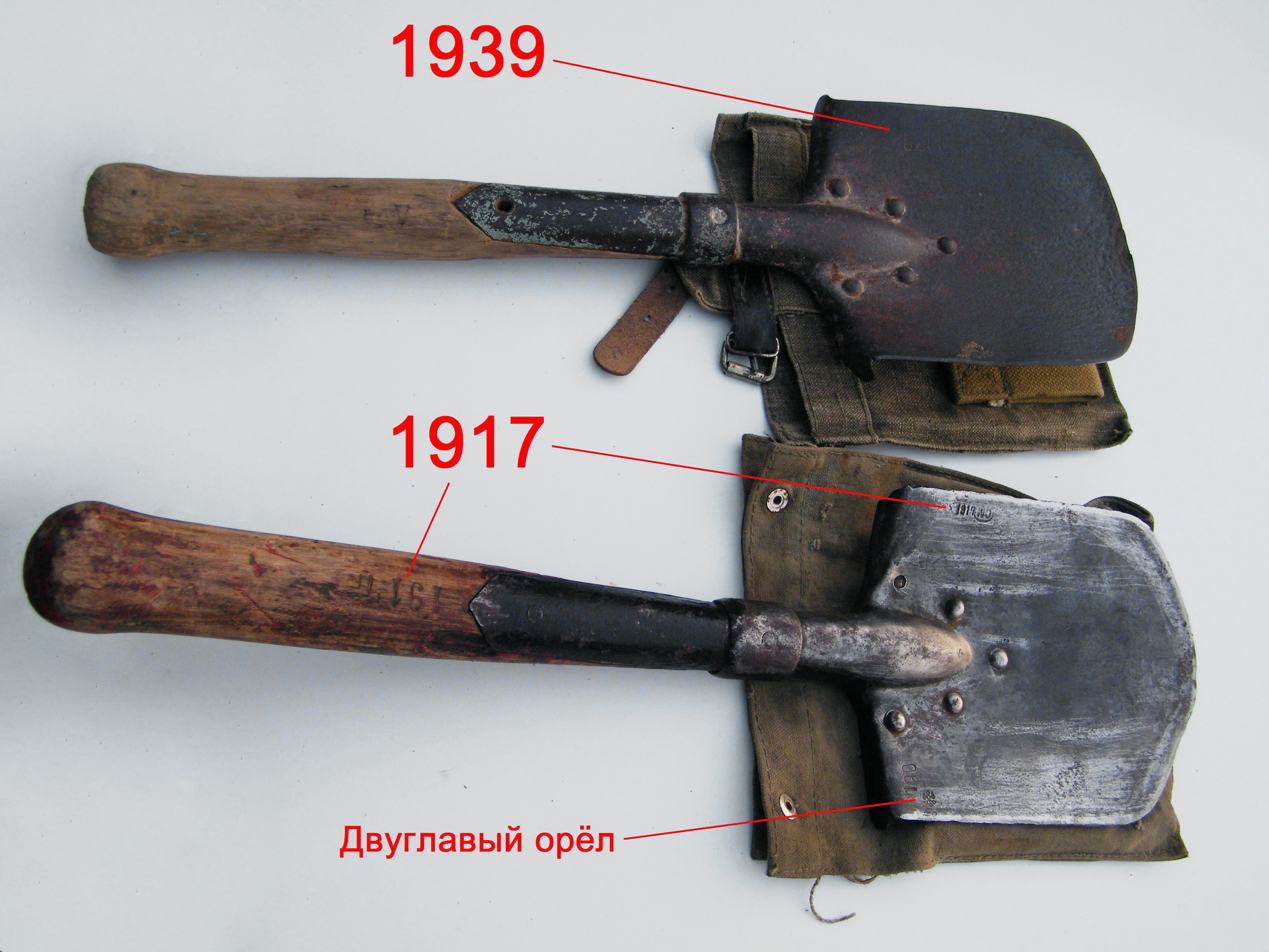
1917 and 1939 MPL-50 models. Note that the 1917 model has a double-headed eagle.

The MPL-50 (Russian: МПЛ-50, малая пехотная лопата-50, malaya pekhotnaya lopata-50, small infantry spade-50) is a small spade (50 cm (20 in) length) invented by Danish officer Mads Johan Buch Linnemann in 1869. It has been used by rank and file military personnel in the Russian Empire, Soviet Union and its successor states since the late 19th century. While nominally an entrenching tool, the MPL-50 has seen wide-ranging wartime applications, from a close-quarters combat weapon to a cooking utensil. It is sometimes known by the name 'Saperka'.

== History ==
The MPL-50 was invented in 1869 by the Danish officer Mads Johan Buch Linnemann. In 1870 it was patented and supplied to the Danish Army. The next year it was adopted by the much bigger Austrian Army, and Linnemann founded a factory in Vienna to produce his spade. It was later introduced to Germany, France, Romania and Russia, though only Russia recognized Linnemann's patent rights, and paid him 30,000 rubles and ordered 60,000 spades. The MPL-50 remains almost unchanged through its history in Russia and the Soviet Union; attempts to introduce a folded-handle design were not approved.

== Design ==
The MPL-50 has a total length of 50 cm (20 in); the steel blade is 15 cm (5.9 in) wide and 18 cm (7.1 in) long. It is sharpened on its working edge and often on one side, for use as an axe. The wooden handle is not painted, but polished with sandpaper and fire singed to create a smooth surface that doesn't slide off the user's hand. The blade carries the manufacturer's seal, which indicates the production year and distinguishes original products from forgeries.

== Use ==
The main purpose of MPL-50 is entrenching, which is carried out at a rate of 0.1–0.5 m^{3}/hour depending on the soil type and physical condition of the soldier. The spade can also be used as an axe, and one side of its blade is sharpened for this purpose, or as a hammer, with the flat of the blade as the working surface. It can serve as an oar for paddling on improvised rafts, as a frying pan for cooking food, and as a measuring device, as its length and width are standardized.

Soviet Spetsnaz units had advanced training with the MPL-50, which they mostly used as a weapon for close quarters combat rather than for entrenching. The spade is well balanced, which allows it to be used as a throwing weapon.

In March 2023, the UK's Ministry of Defence claimed that Russian military reservists fighting in Ukraine had resorted to using MPL-50s in hand-to-hand combat, due to a shortage of ammunition.
