= Steyr M =

Series of semi-automatic pistols

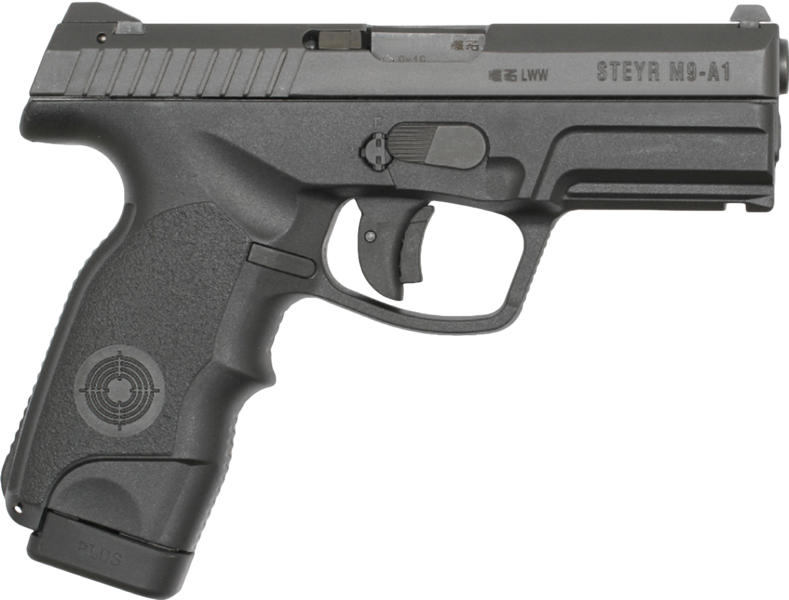
- "Third generation" Steyr M9-A1 with 15-round +2 baseplate magazine
- Type: Semi-automatic pistol
- Place of origin: Austria

Production history
- Designer: Friedrich Aigner, Wilhelm Bubits
- Designed: 1999
- Manufacturer: Steyr Mannlicher
- Produced: 1999–2026
- Variants: See Variants

Specifications
- Cartridge: 9×19mm Parabellum (L9-A1, M9, S9, M9-A1, L9-A2, M9-A2 S9-A1); 9×21mm (M9, S9, S9-A1—Italian market only).40 S&W (L40-A1, M40, S40, M40-A1, S40-A1).357 SIG (M357, M357-A1)
- Action: Short recoil, locked breech
- Feed system: 17 or 15-round box magazine available (M9-A1); 12-round box magazine (M40, M357); 10-round box magazine (S9, S40)
- Sights: Fixed iron sights, trapezoid notch and triangular front blade

The Steyr M is a series of semi-automatic pistols developed by Steyr Mannlicher GmbH & Co KG of Austria for police services and the civilian shooting market.

== History ==
Design on the Steyr M began in 1999 by Friedrich Aigner and Wilhelm Bubits. Steyr wanted to take advantage of recent advancements in manufacturing techniques. Development on the Steyr M class began in the early 1990s and the final product known as the M9 (adapted to fire the 9×19mm Parabellum cartridge) was officially unveiled in the spring of 1999. The M40 version chambered in .40 S&W was developed before the M9, so the design would be capable of handling the higher pressures of the .40-caliber round.

The M9 and M40 were followed later by the M357 (chambered in .357 SIG), as well as two smaller variants of the M9 and M40 designated the S9 and S40 respectively. These pistols were developed primarily for concealed carry and have a shortened barrel, slide, smaller frame and a reduced magazine capacity. By the time of the fourth generation A2 MF line in 2019, the .40 and .357 models had been discontinued for about a decade, and were never re-introduced for the duration of the M series.

In 2013, the Steyr M (Medium) and S (Small) form factors were complemented by the L (Large) sized series and the C (Compact) sized series both available in 9×19mm Parabellum and .40 S&W chamberings as the L9-A1, L40-A1, C9-A1 and C40-A1. The Steyr M went through four generations (although there were transitionary models between generations as well). First generation guns were produced from 1999 to 2004, second generation guns were produced from 2004 to 2009, third generation guns were produced from 2009 to 2019, and fourth generation modular frame guns were produced from 2019 until 2025.

In April 2024, the company was acquired by Czech RSBC Holding a.s., which owns also Slovenian gun maker Arex Arms. The two companies were combined into a single defense division to expand their global product portfolios. Subsequently, in 2025, Steyr announced that they were releasing their first new pistols since the M line, the metal-framed, hammer-fired AT-C (Competition) and AT-D (Defense), which are essentially upgraded versions of the Arex Zero line. In early 2026, it was confirmed by Steyr that the M line had been discontinued so the company could focus on the newer Arex-derived models.

== Design details ==
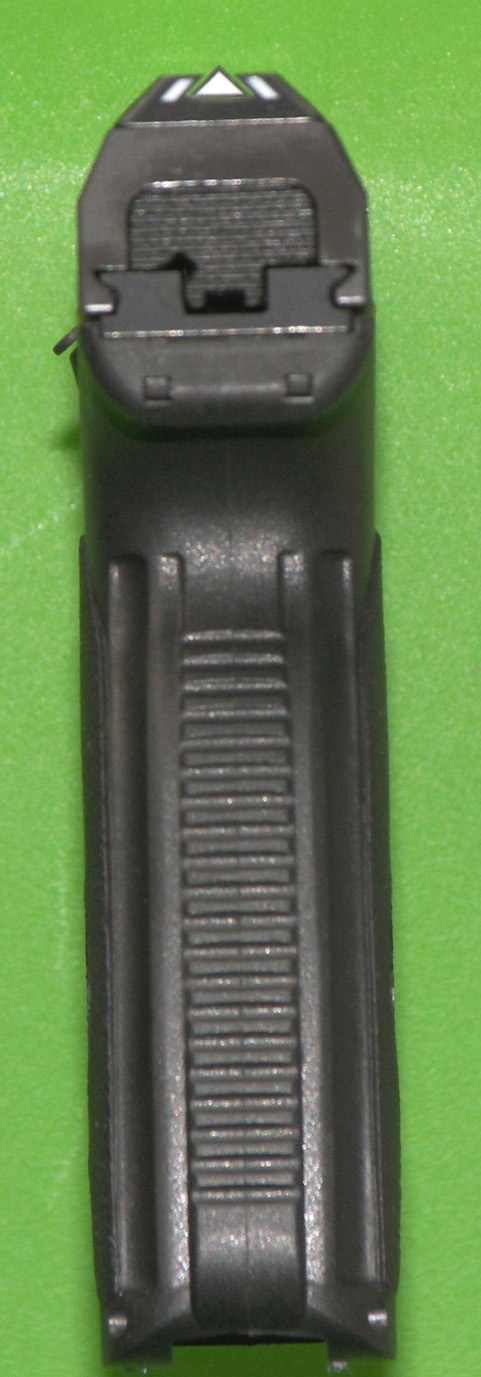
The unique "trapezoidal" sight picture for the Steyr M pistol series.

=== Grip ===
The Steyr M series uses a very high grip profile which holds the barrel axis close to the shooter's hand and makes the Steyr M more comfortable to shoot by reducing muzzle rise and allowing for faster aim recovery in rapid shooting sequence.

=== Sighting ===
The Steyr M series derives its name from the unique "trapezoidal" sight picture of its fixed, low-profile iron sights.

The unique sighting arrangement consists of a triangular front sight and a trapezoid rear notch that lead the eye to the target for quicker target acquisition and allow for instinctive aiming.

The front sight contains a non-luminescent white triangle contrast element designed to mate with two white rectangles on the rear sight. Optional adjustable or non-adjustable tritium-illuminated three-dot low light situation sights can also be fitted to the Steyr M; these have a conventional rectangular profile.

The original pistol's frame also has proprietary mounting rails for attaching accessories, such as a tactical light or laser pointer.

=== Operation ===
The Steyr M series of pistols employs the mechanically locked Browning short recoil method of operation with a linkless, vertically dropping barrel.

The cold-hammer-forged conventional rifled barrel is locked to the slide by means of a single rectangular lug around the barrel chamber that recesses into the ejection port in the slide.

When fired, the recoil impulse from the ignited cartridge drives the barrel and slide back, locked together until the bullet leaves the barrel and pressures drop to a safe level. A locking block integrated into the frame then engages a lug at the base of the chamber and drives the barrel downward, separating it from the slide and terminating any further rearward movement while the slide continues back in a straight line.

Hammerless and striker-fired, the Steyr M features a double action only (DAO) pre-set trigger mechanism marketed as a "Reset Action" trigger. When the trigger is in the forward position, the firing pin spring remains lightly compressed (pre-cocked by the forward motion of the slide as it returns to battery).

Pulling the trigger all the way to the back will compress the firing pin spring completely, draw the firing pin fully to the rear and position the trigger bar to release the firing pin and fire a round. The trigger travel is 4 mm (0.16 in) with a pull weight of 25 N (5.6 lb_{f}). The slide is precision-milled from steel; and coated in a tenifer finish.

The frame is an injection-molded synthetic polymer and parts of the trigger and striker mechanisms are pressed from sheet metal.

=== Magazines ===
The pistols are fed using a detachable steel magazine of the single position feed type with the cartridges arranged in a staggered column pattern. The magazine's follower and floor plate are fabricated from polymer.

The magazine catch-release is located on the left side of the frame, directly behind the trigger guard.

After expending the last cartridge from the magazine, the pistol's slide remains locked open on the metal slide stop, located on the left side of the frame and operated with the thumb.

=== Safety mechanism ===
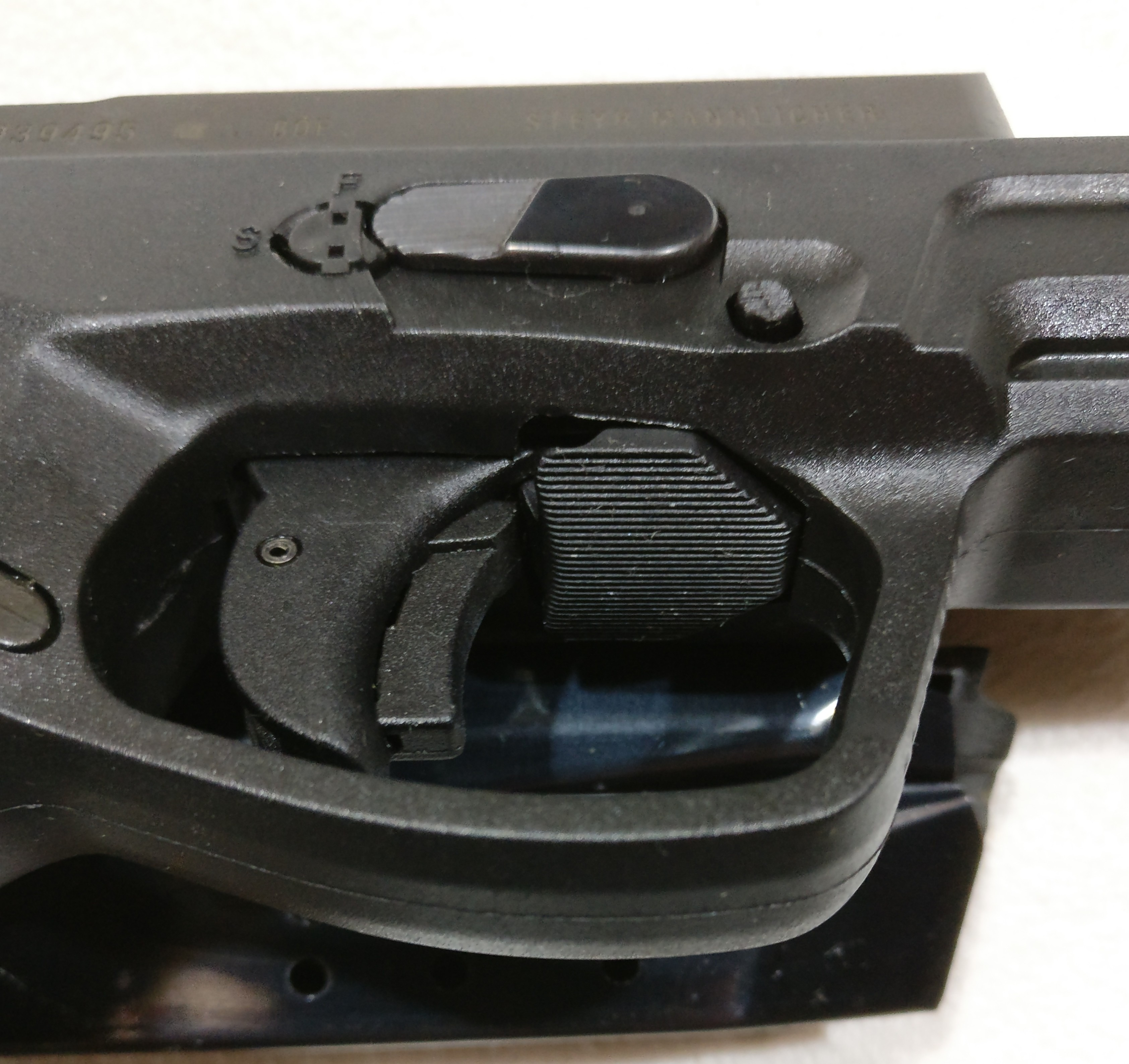
Steyr M357-A1 with a close up view of the manual safety button. This safety was only offered on European guns and first generation models that were imported into the United States.

The pistol has a multi-stage safety system consisting of two automatic internal safeties, two external trigger safeties and a manual lock safety.

==== First trigger safety ====
The first external trigger safety acts as the primary fail-safe. A small, spring-loaded inner trigger is housed in a wide, outer trigger and cannot be actuated unless the inset trigger is depressed first.

This keeps the trigger from being pulled by an inadvertent off-angle trigger pull. This trigger safety also activates and when released—deactivates the two internal safeties: the firing pin and drop safety.

The firing pin safety is contained in the pistol's slide and blocks the longitudinal movement of the striker.

==== Second trigger safety ====
The second trigger safety is an optional, manually operated plastic bar located inside the trigger guard and projecting out from the base of the pistol's frame when activated, revealing a small white dot.

This indicates that the pistol is currently incapable of being fired. It is used as an additional safety that disables the trigger with the firing pin spring cocked (after reloading the pistol).

This safety is engaged by simultaneously pushing in two buttons on both sides of the frame and then deactivated by simply lifting the trigger finger and pushing the bar up and into the pistol's frame, thus allowing the trigger to be pulled back and the weapon fired.

These safeties enable safe handling of the pistol with a round present in the chamber (the so-called "cocked and locked" condition) and allow for rapid deployment and immediate firing; this arrangement however does not permit the firing mechanism to be re-cocked in case of a misfire after the trigger has been pulled.

=== Other safety features ===
Other safety features include a loaded chamber indicator and an integrated limited access lock operated using a key to prevent unauthorized use.

The latter key can be either a handcuff key or a special factory-supplied key. If required, the access lock can be omitted. The locking mechanism is located above the trigger area of the pistol and is characterized by a small circular plate with two holes in it (in the police version of the pistols there is a handcuff key hole instead of the two small holes). It has two positions: "F" and "S".

When pushed in and rotated to the "S" position with the provided key, the lock disables the trigger and barrel and prevents the pistol from being disassembled. This unique system of limiting access to the weapon was patented (U.S. patent 6,212,812) by Friedrich Aigner in 1999.

== Comparison with other pistols ==
While the Steyr M is frequently compared to Glock-series pistols (both are polymer-framed striker-fired pistols, with Tenifer finishes), there are several differences in the details of the design.

For example, the M-series had a fully supported chamber in all chamberings from the start (Some Glock models also had this feature from the start, other Glock models evolved to having more supported chambers when compared to their original internal layout), unique triangular/trapezoid sights, three loaded chamber indicators (both visual and tactile as the extractor will protrude slightly when the chamber is loaded, there is also a witness hole on the top of the barrel and a rod on the back of the slide that protrudes when the chamber is loaded) and a different grip angle (111°).

Takedown is also considerably different as on the Steyr M, a button must be depressed while a takedown lever is rotated down. Glock pistols require you to pull two levers downward while pulling slightly back on the slide in order to take the pistol apart. Both designs, however, require the user to pull the trigger to complete a field strip.

== Product evolution ==
=== First-generation models ===
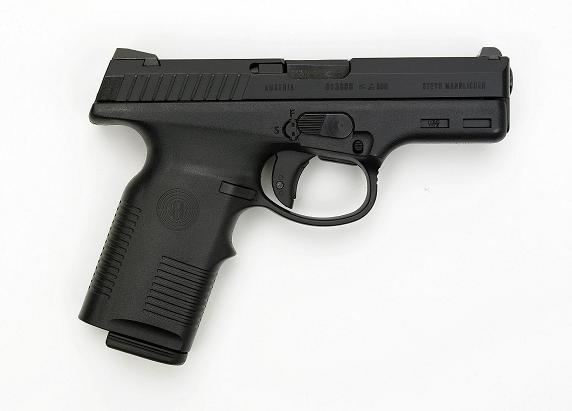
'First generation' Steyr M9

The original M models were produced from 1999 to 2004 and are considered "first generation" designs.

The first generation guns were produced in the M (Medium) and S (Sub-Compact/Small) sizes, and were chambered in 9mm, .40 S&W and .357 SIG.

These models are most easily distinguished by their frames, which have no grip texture at all aside from some straight lines molded into the polymer.

The Steyr Arms "target" logo is also in the center of both sides of the grip, and there is a single finger groove on the front strap.

The first generation guns also have no thumb rests, and have an early proprietary accessory rail, as standardized rails had not been established yet.

The first generation S9 frame is too small for a rail and does not have one.

The first generation models only came in black, with a flat black coating on the slide, however this black coating is commonly worn off on guns that were used heavily.

The first generation models are the only guns in the series that have a rounded trigger guard, somewhat resembling the Smith & Wesson SW. The first generation models are also notable because they were the only generation that had the manual safety on every gun manufactured, located inside the trigger guard. Beginning with the second generation, the manual safety feature was optional.

=== Second-generation models ===
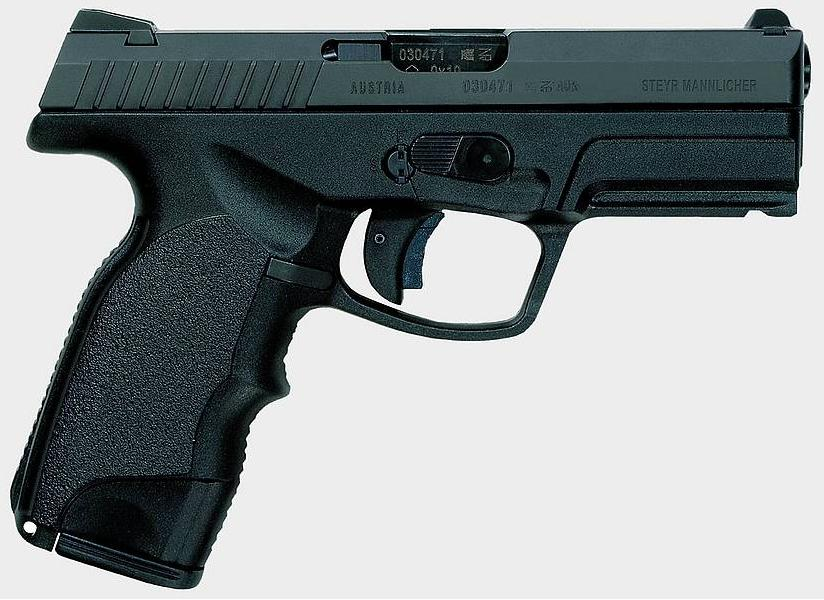
'Second generation' Steyr M9-A1

In 2004, an improved version of the pistol replaced the original Steyr M in production. The new 'second generation' Steyr M-A1 and S-A1 pistols received several improvements.

These incorporated more textured surfaces on the grip and magazine well, which were both redesigned to improve ergonomics.

Other features include enhanced finger grooves, stippling on the front and back straps, a straightened trigger guard, thumb rests and a single-slot 2324 Picatinny accessory rail.

The second generation models also incorporated a dark gray finish on the slide, a departure from the flat black finish of the first generation guns.

The gray finish was retained on the third and fourth generation models.

On second generation guns, the manual safety button was now optional (not in models sold in the United States, all US imports lack the manual safety).

Later 'second generation' models also have a modified extractor for easier ejecting of casings. Second generation models also incorporated Steyr's target insignia with "Mannlicher" molded into the left side of the grip to signify the company.

In 2009, Steyr stopped importing the second generation line, citing economic fluctuation that meant they were unable to price the guns competitively.

Transition models between the second and third generations also exist, with a non-ambidextrous safety and some with an early version of the Steyr "target" logo on the grip of third generation guns, identical to the Steyr company logo on the grip of first generation guns.

=== Third-generation models ===
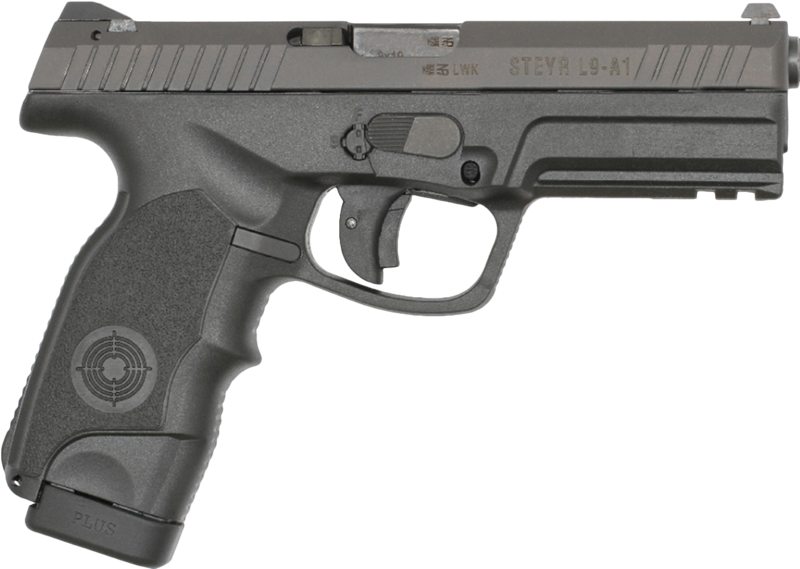
'Third generation' Steyr L9-A1

In 2010, Steyr Mannlicher US began reimporting Steyr M-A1 and S-A1 pistols with a newly updated design.

Third generation guns can be confusing because they are marked A1 just like the second generation guns and share the same grip design, but they can be identified by the Steyr Arms target insignia (without the company name) on both sides of the grip.

Third generation models also have a roll pin in the slide just under the rear sight element, a reversible magazine release button for left-handed shooters, an improved trigger and magazines with a plus-two round baseplate.

These new 15+2 (in 9mm) and 12+2 (in .40) magazines are fully compatible and interchangeable with both newer guns and older guns in the series.

Steyr offers conversion kits to swap 'third generation' models between 9×19mm Parabellum and .40 S&W. These kits consist of a slide, barrel, recoil spring assembly and magazine. .357 SIG production ceased in 2014. The third generation also saw the introduction of two new models.

The first was introduced in 2010 and designated the C-A1 (for "Compact"), which combined the longer M-sized grip and the shorter S-sized slide and barrel.

The Cs were offered in 9×19mm Parabellum and .40 S&W chamberings as the C9-A1 and C40-A1. For Italy only, the C9-A1 is offered in the 9×21mm chambering.

In 2013, the L-A1 size was introduced which incorporated front cocking serrations and a longer barrel at 115 mm (4.5 in) than the M size. At the time, the third generation models were produced for the longest period of time and are typically the most commonly seen in the series.

=== Fourth-generation models ===
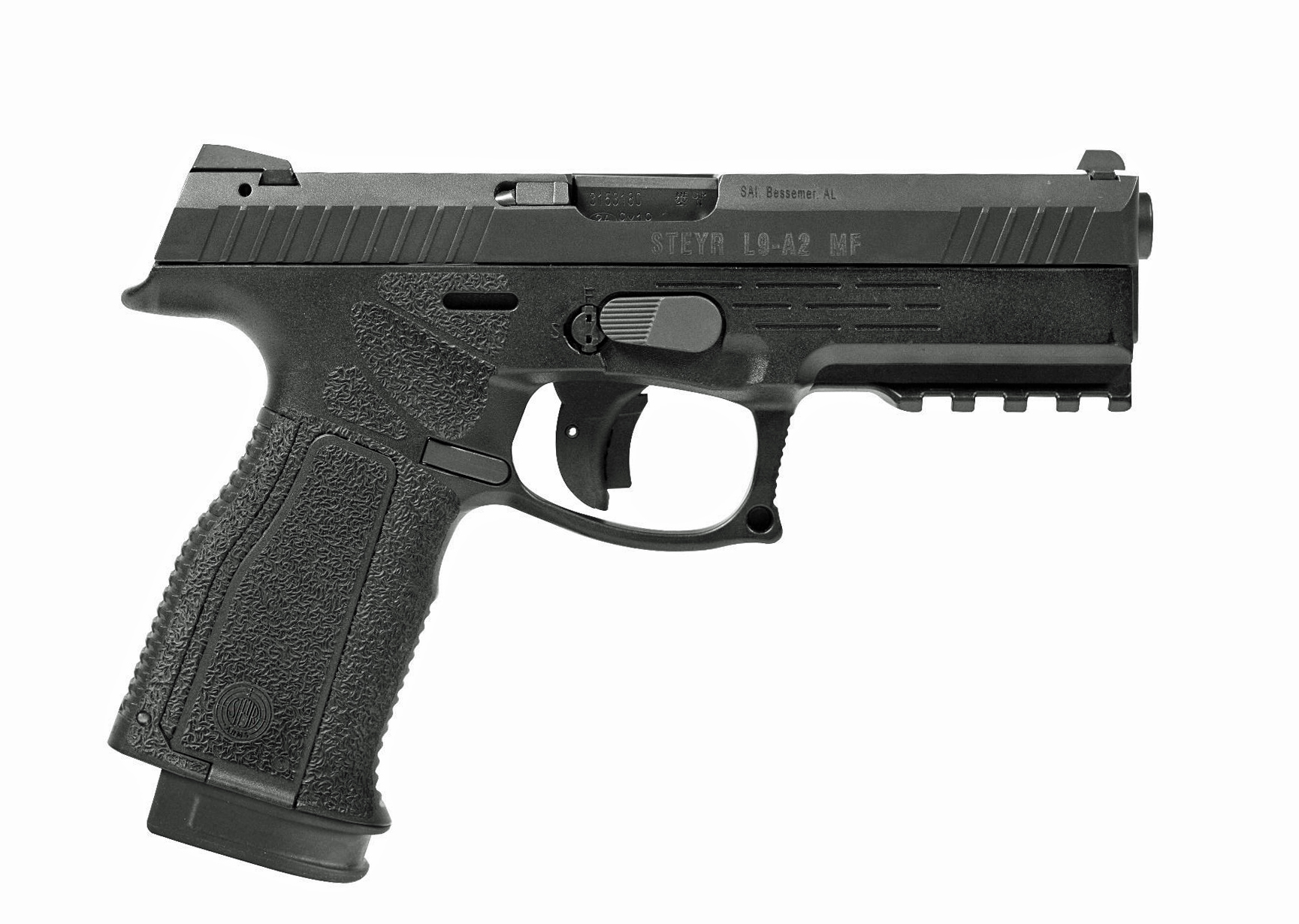
'Fourth generation' Steyr L9-A2 MF

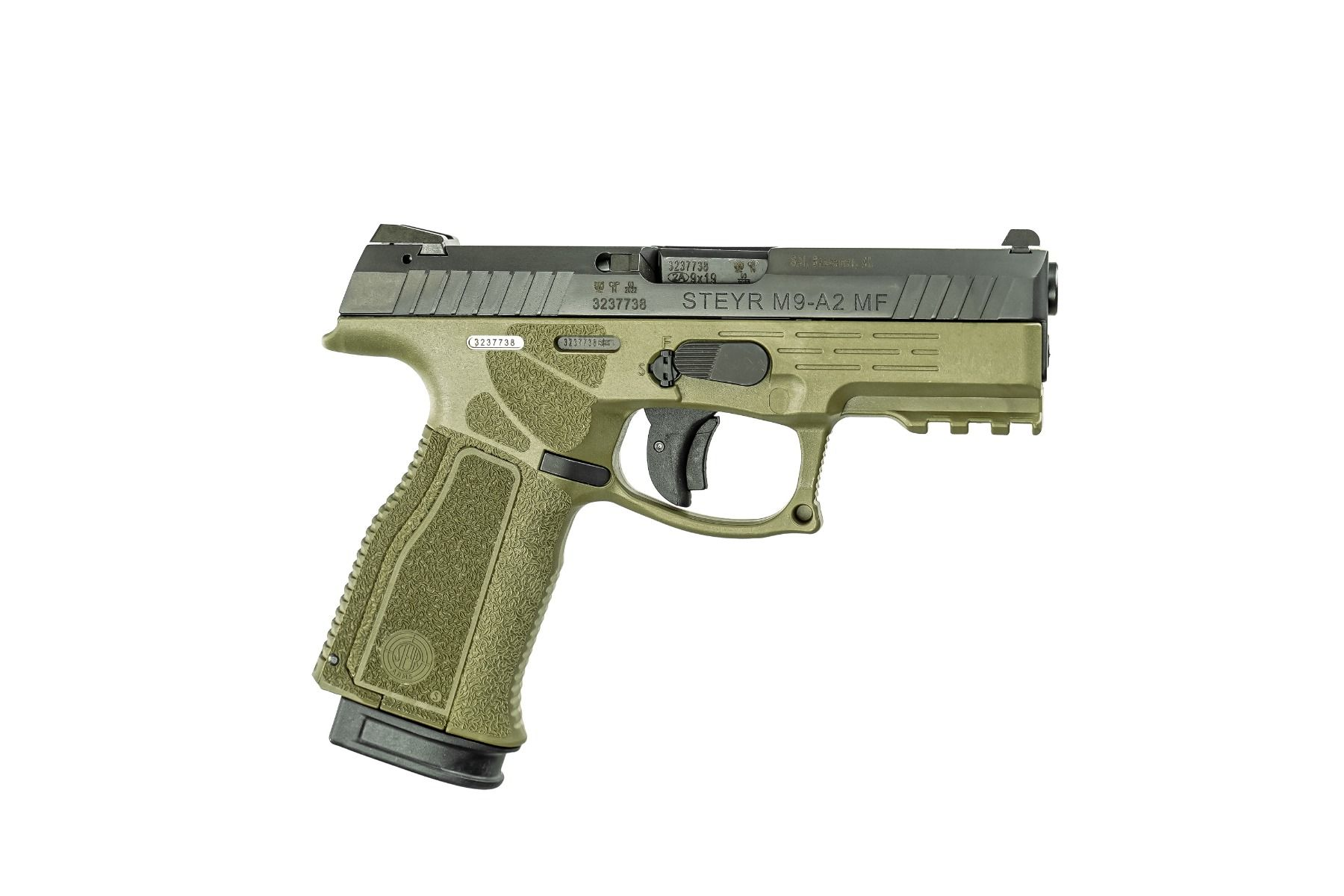
'Fourth generation' Steyr M9-A2 MF with olive drab green frame

In 2019 Steyr introduced the A2 MF series in 9×19mm Parabellum in three form factors: the Large size L9-A2 MF, Medium M9-A2 MF and Compact C9-A2 MF.

The "S" models were not continued in the fourth generation. The "MF" in the designations stands for "Modular Frame".

The 'fourth generation' A2 MF series have a (serialized) chassis/trigger pack, making them not backwards compatible to previous series.

In 1999, Wilhelm Bubits and Friedrich Aigner, the designers of the original Steyr M, filed the first ever patent for a modular handgun. However it was not until the fourth generation models where Steyr offered a fully removable serialized firing control unit. Yet, this part cannot be placed into other frames, as the frame itself is also serialized and Steyr does not offer different grip frame modules for this purpose.

In addition to the modular design, the most notable change on the fourth generation design is the revised grip frame, which features a full-length STANAG 2324 Picatinny rail on all models, as well as a squared trigger guard, flared magazine well and a lengthened beaver tail.

The grip was redesigned to be more ergonomic, removing the finger rest on the front strap, incorporating more aggressive surface texturing and allowing users to change the grip size with interchangeable back-straps and side grip inlay panels.

The slide layout is different from previous models, has different font and all models come with front cocking serrations.

Internally, the design is largely the same, but the ejector was modified to counteract erratic spent cartridge case ejection. The magazines were modified with new, longer baseplates and orange followers.

These new magazines will not work on older models without a baseplate change, but all older magazines are fully interchangeable with the fourth generation models.

Dimensionally, the A2 MF series are somewhat longer and wider than the preceding A1 series and can be ordered with an olive drab grip frame.

The fourth generation would be the last in the Steyr M family, as the guns were discontinued in early 2026 and removed as product offerings on Steyr's American website.

Series	Model	Cartridge	Length	Height	Width	Barrel Length	Weight (unloaded)	Magazine Capacity
M	M9	9×19mm 9×21mm	176 mm (6.9 in)	136 mm (5.4 in)	30 mm (1.2 in)	101 mm (4.0 in)	747 g (26.3 oz)	10, 14, 15, 17
M	M40	.40 S&W	176 mm (6.9 in)	136 mm (5.4 in)	30 mm (1.2 in)	101 mm (4.0 in)	767 g (27.1 oz)	10, 12
M	M357	.357 SIG	176 mm (6.9 in)	136 mm (5.4 in)	30 mm (1.2 in)	101 mm (4.0 in)	778 g (27.4 oz)	10, 12
M-A1	M9-A1	9×19mm 9×21mm	176 mm (6.9 in)	136 mm (5.4 in)	30 mm (1.2 in)	102 mm (4.0 in)	766 g (27.0 oz)	10, 14, 15, 17
M-A1	M40-A1	.40 S&W	176 mm (6.9 in)	136 mm (5.4 in)	30 mm (1.2 in)	102 mm (4.0 in)	766 g (27.0 oz)	10, 12
M-A1	M357-A1	.357 SIG	176 mm (6.9 in)	136 mm (5.4 in)	30 mm (1.2 in)	102 mm (4.0 in)	776 g (27.4 oz)	10, 12
S	S9	9×19mm	168 mm (6.6 in)	117 mm (4.6 in)	30 mm (1.2 in)	91 mm (3.6 in)	725 g (25.6 oz)	10, 14, 15, 17
S	S40	.40 S&W	168 mm (6.6 in)	117 mm (4.6 in)	30 mm (1.2 in)	91 mm (3.6 in)	725 g (25.6 oz)	10, 12
S-A1	S9-A1	9×19mm 9×21mm	166.5 mm (6.6 in)	123 mm (4.8 in)	30 mm (1.2 in)	92 mm (3.6 in)	664 g (23.4 oz)	10, 14, 15, 17
S-A1	S40-A1	.40 S&W	170 mm (6.7 in)	123 mm (4.8 in)	30 mm (1.2 in)	96 mm (3.8 in)	678 g (23.9 oz)	10, 12
C-A1	C9-A1	9×19mm 9×21mm	170 mm (6.7 in)	132 mm (5.2 in)	30 mm (1.2 in)	92 mm (3.6 in)	766 g (27.0 oz)	15, 17
C-A1	C40-A1	.40 S&W	175 mm (6.9 in)	132 mm (5.2 in)	30 mm (1.2 in)	96 mm (3.8 in)	780 g (28 oz)	10, 12
L-A1	L9-A1	9×19mm	188.5 mm (7.4 in)	142 mm (5.6 in)	30 mm (1.2 in)	115 mm (4.5 in)	817 g (28.8 oz)	17
L-A1	L40-A1	.40 S&W	188.5 mm (7.4 in)	136 mm (5.4 in)	30 mm (1.2 in)	115 mm (4.5 in)	838 g (29.6 oz)	12
A2 MF	L9-A2 MF	9×19mm	200 mm (7.9 in)	142 mm (5.6 in)	33 mm (1.3 in)	115 mm (4.5 in)	785 g (27.7 oz)	10, 17
A2 MF	M9-A2 MF	9×19mm	187 mm (7.4 in)	142 mm (5.6 in)	33 mm (1.3 in)	102 mm (4.0 in)	780 g (28 oz)	10, 17
A2 MF	C9-A2 MF	9×19mm	177 mm (7.0 in)	142 mm (5.6 in)	33 mm (1.3 in)	92 mm (3.6 in)	766 g (27.0 oz)	10, 17

== Users ==
=== Current users ===
- Georgia: Used by Police SWAT
- Pakistan: Pakistan Army
- Taiwan: Republic of China Army
- United Kingdom:
  - Falkland Islands: Falklands Islands Defence Force

=== Failed bids ===
- United Kingdom: 19 M9A1 pistols evaluated as a replacement for the Browning L9A1 pistol, lost to the Glock 17 Gen 4

== Gallery ==
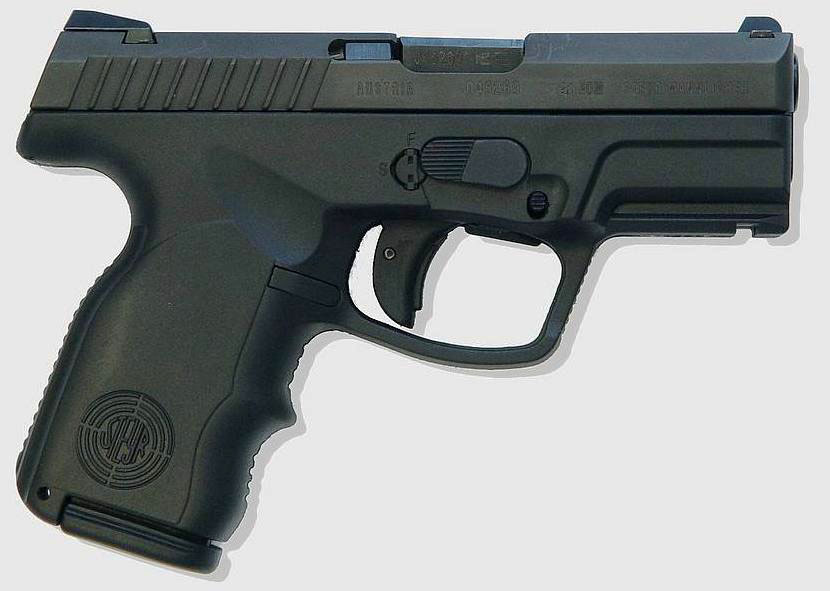
'Generation 1.5' Steyr S9-A1 (has the second generation rail but the first generation grip texture)

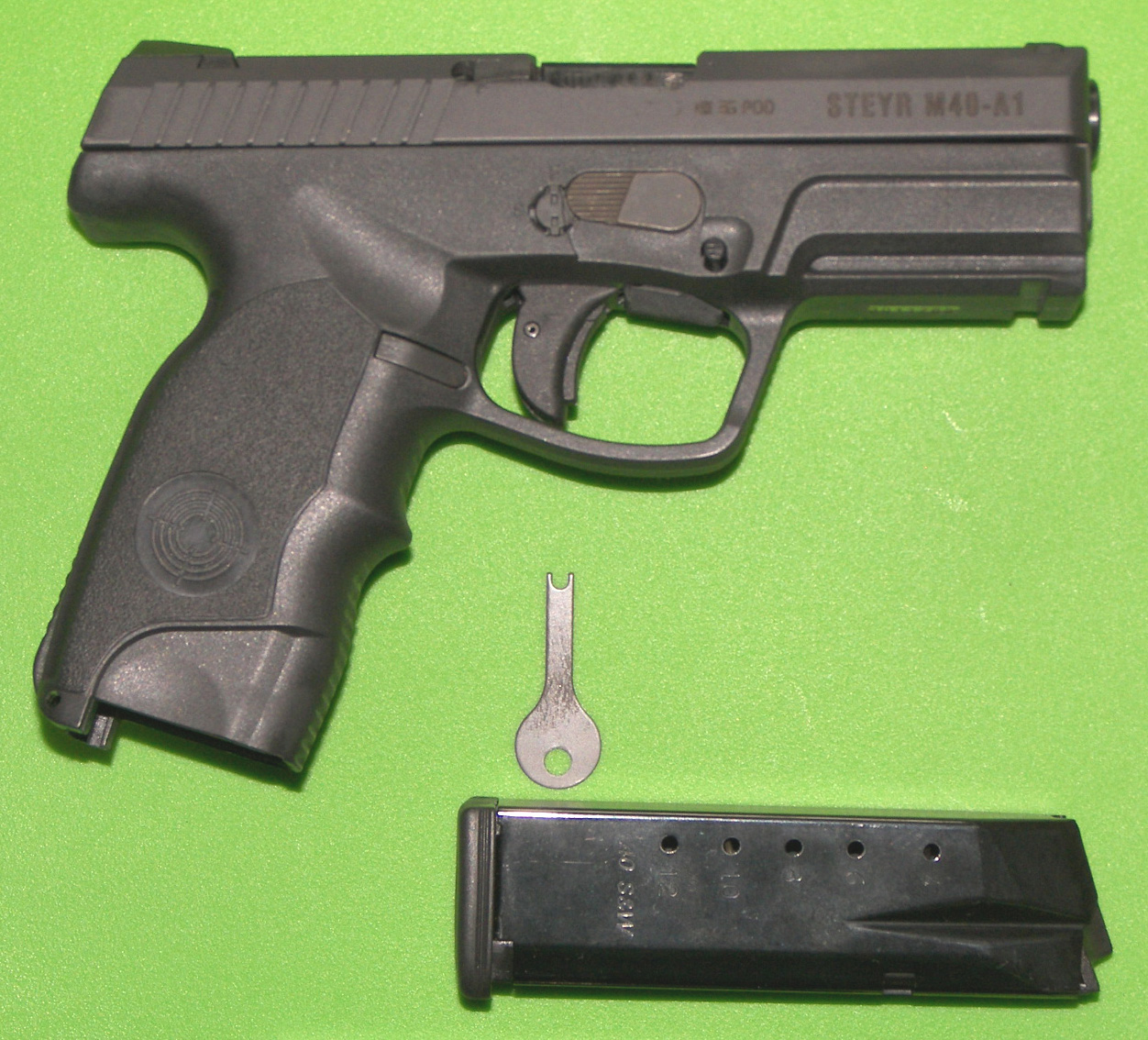
'Third generation' Steyr M40-A1 with magazine and limited access lock key, and manual safety

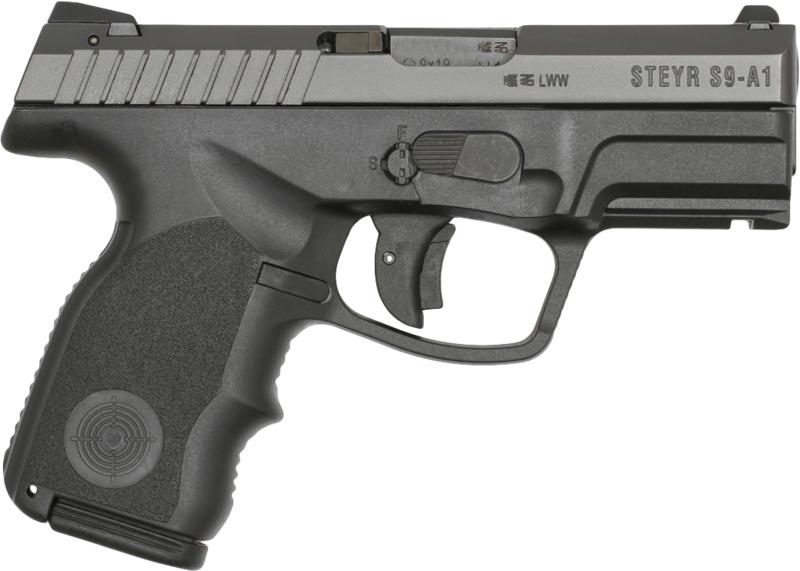
'Third generation' Steyr S9-A1.

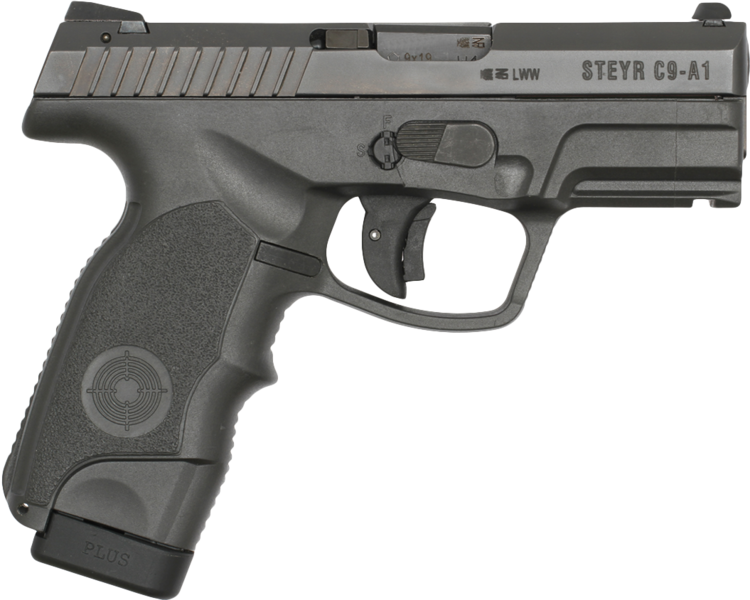
'Third generation' Steyr C9-A1.

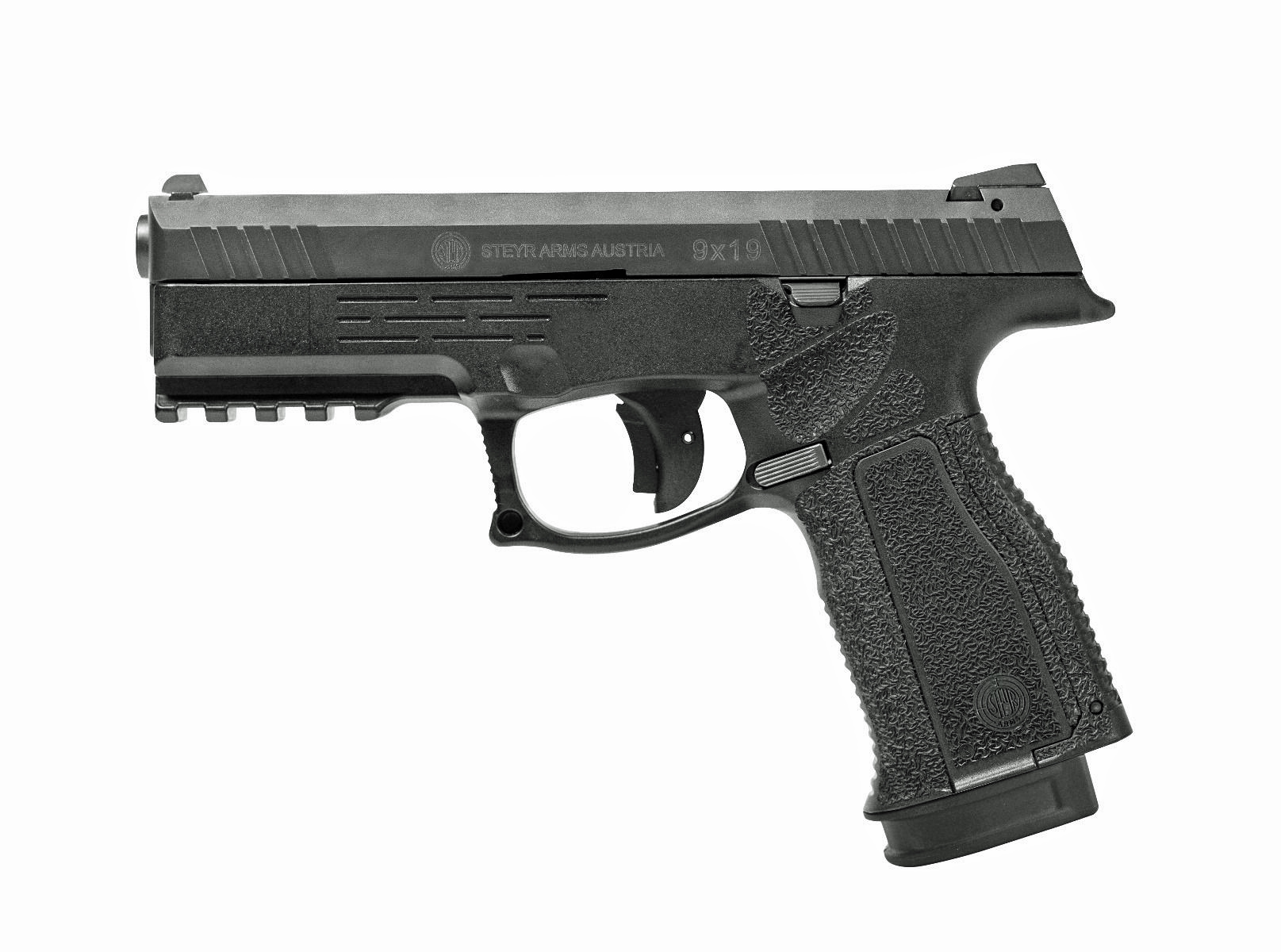
'Fourth generation' Steyr L9-A2 MF.

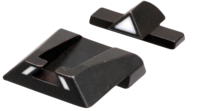
Steyr trapezoidal pistol sights.

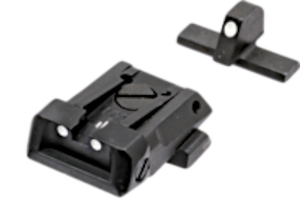
Steyr adjustable pistol sights.

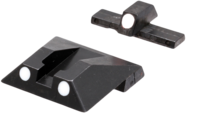
Steyr rectangular pistol sights.

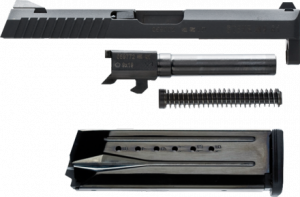
'Third generation' Steyr conversion kit between 9×19mm Parabellum and .40 S&W.

== See also ==
- Caracal pistol—also designed by Wilhelm Bubits

== General bibliography ==
- Kinard, Jeff (2004). Pistols: An Illustrated History of Their Impact. Santa Barbara, California: ABC-CLIO. ISBN 1-85109-470-9.
- Woźniak, Ryszard; Tomasz Begier (2002). Encyklopedia najnowszej broni palnej—tom 4 R-Z (in Polish). Warsaw: Bellona. ISBN 83-11-09312-1.
