= Glock: The Rise of America's Gun =

Book by Paul Barrett

- Author: Paul Barrett
- Language: English
- Genre: War; Historical non-fiction
- Publisher: Broadway Books
- Publication date: 2012
- Publication place: United States
- Media type: Hardcover
- Pages: 291
- ISBN: 9780307719935
- OCLC: 714724571

Glock: The Rise of America's Gun is a 320-page book written by Paul M. Barrett and published by Broadway Books.

The book details the history of the famous Glock pistol. It also points out the business mistakes of rival gunmakers that helped Glock surpass them all.

== Development ==
The majority of the information in the book was sourced from court documents as well as interviews with former executives of Glock Ges.m.b.H.

== Reception ==
The book received mostly positive reviews. Michael Washburn of The New York Times described it as an "engaging if uneven history of the most famous handgun in contemporary America." Publishers Weekly states "Barrett is right on target, delivering a well-oiled, fact-packed, and fast-paced history of the Glock." Daniel Horan of The Wall Street Journal called it "a fascinating look at one man's extraordinary success".
