= Glock knife =

Series of Austrian military field knives

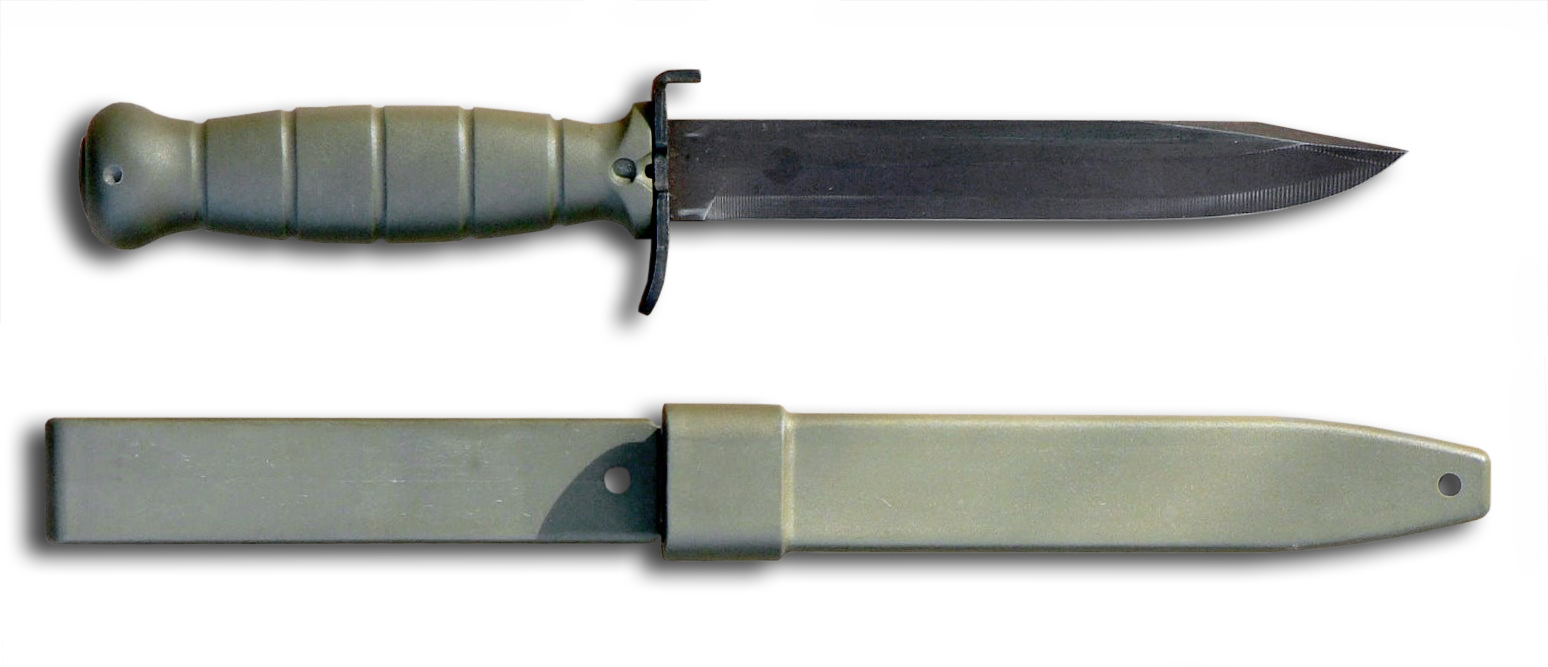
- First-generation Glock Feldmesser FM 78 and its sheath
- Type: Combat knife
- Place of origin: Austria

Service history
- Used by: See Users

Production history
- Designer: Glock Ges.m.b.H.
- Manufacturer: Glock Ges.m.b.H.
- Variants: Feldmesser 78 and 81

Specifications
- Length: 290 millimetres (11 in)
- Blade length: 165 millimetres (6.5 in)
- Blade type: Clip point
- Scabbard/sheath: Glock polymer

The Glock knife (German: Glock Feldmesser) is a military combat knife product line designed and produced by Glock Ges.m.b.H., located in Deutsch-Wagram, Austria.

== Design ==
Made under the request of the Jagdkommando, both Glock knives have clip point blades made of SAE 1095 carbon steel with a hardness of 55 HRC and are electrophoretic coated.

The handle of the Glock field knives was originally available in the colours olive drab, black, gray and desert sand.

== Variants ==
Glock currently manufactures two models of knife:

=== Feldmesser 78 ===
The field knife 78 (German: Feldmesser 78), is a classic field knife, with a 165-millimetre-long (6.5 in) and 5-millimetre-thick (0.20 in) blade, 290-millimetre (11 in) overall length and weighs 206 g (7.3 oz).

=== Feldmesser 81 ===
The survival knife 81 (German: Feldmesser 81) has the same overall dimensions as the Field Knife 78 with the addition of saw-teeth on the back of the blade and weighs 202 g (7.1 oz).

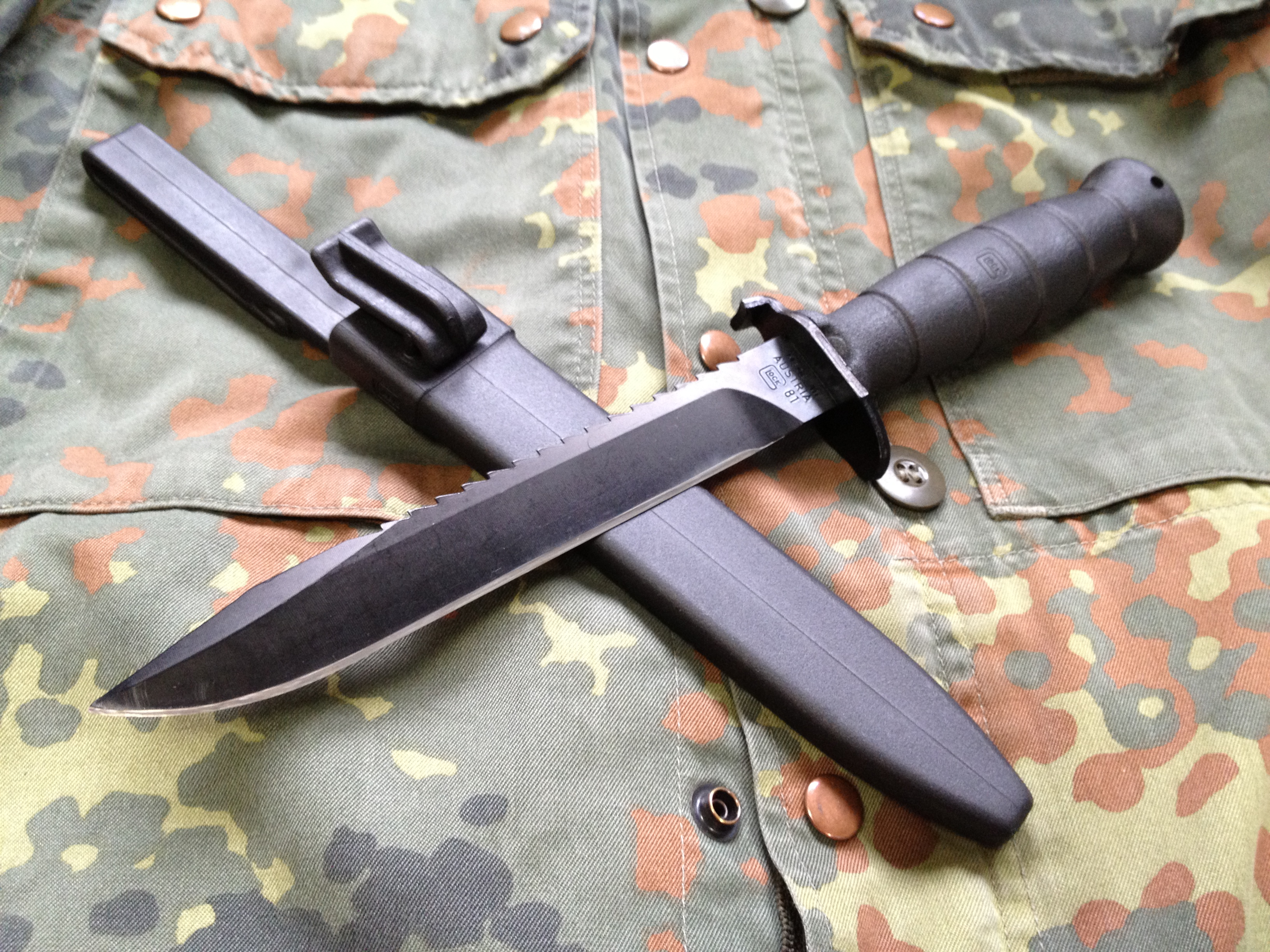
Survival Knife 81 (Feldmesser 81) with saw-teeth at the back of the blade and its sheath

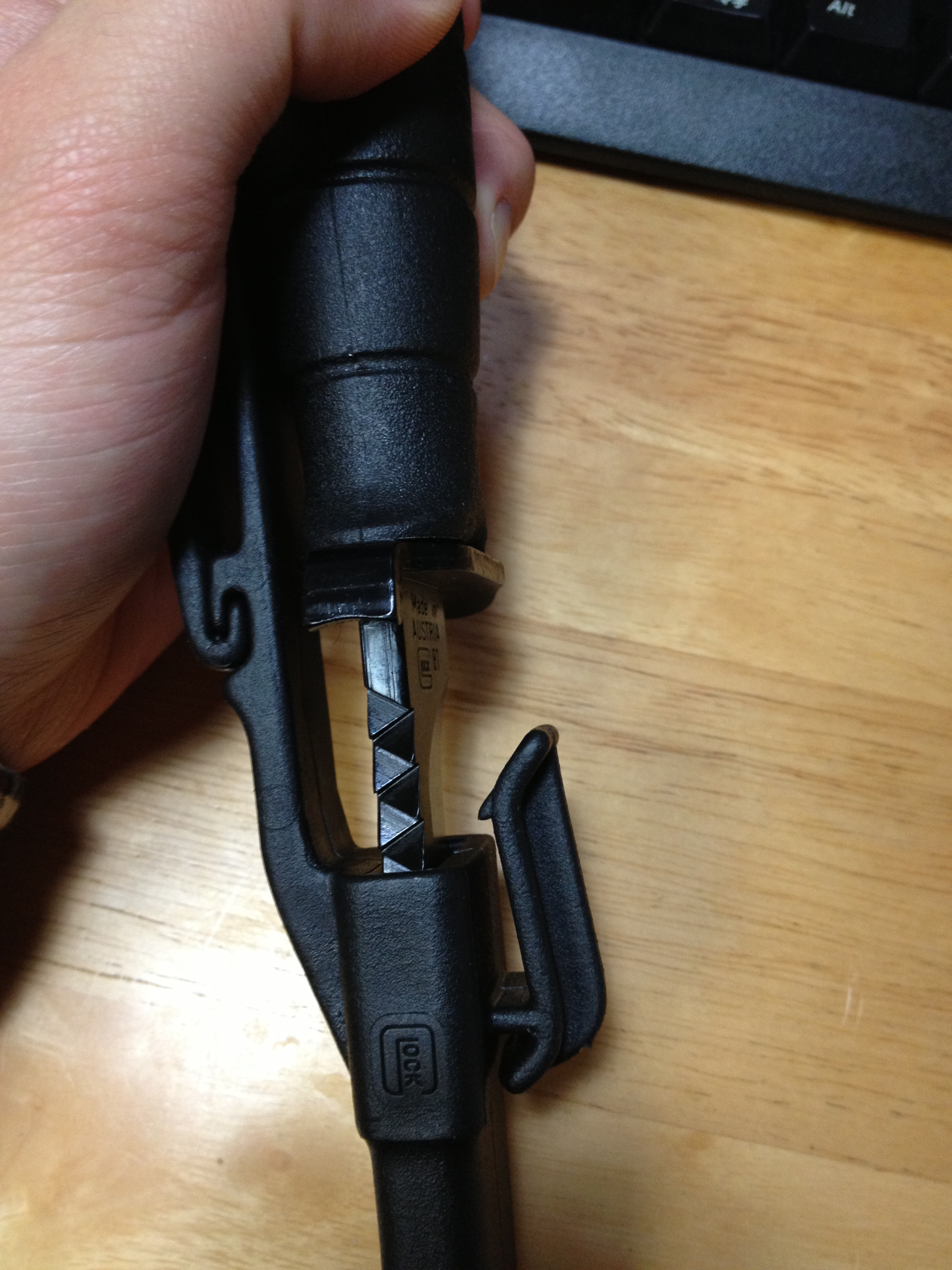
Close up of a Survival Knife 81 (Feldmesser 81) with saw-teeth at the back of the blade and its sheath locking clip.

== Users ==
- Austria
  - Austrian Armed Forces (Note: Field knife 78, designated as the FM 78 or FMsr 78)
- Denmark
  - Danish Defence (Note: Designated as the Feltkniv M/96)
- Luxembourg
  - Palace guards
- Germany
  - GSG 9
- Malaysia
  - Pasukan Gerakan Khas of Royal Malaysia Police as commando dagger.
- Poland
  - Military Gendarmerie (Note: Field knife 78 and 81)

== See also ==
- M9 bayonet
- Glock pistol
- Glock entrenching tool
