= Deutsch-Wagram =

- Municipality
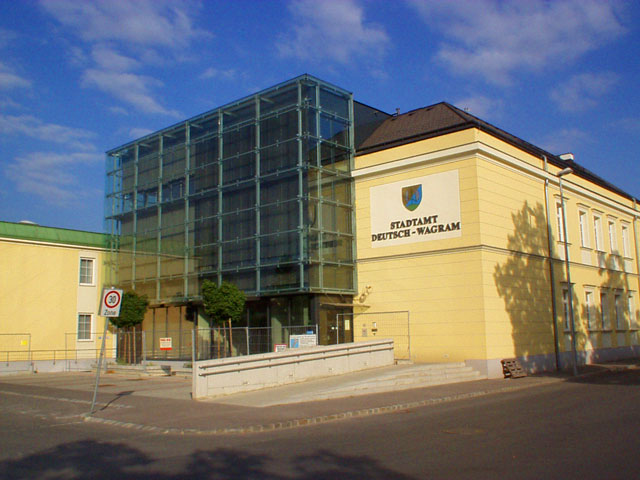
- Town hall

- Coat of arms

- Location within Austria
- Coordinates: 48°18′N 16°34′E
- Country: Austria
- State: Lower Austria
- District: Gänserndorf

Government
  - Mayor: Ulla Mühl-Hittinger (ÖVP)

Area
  - Total: 30.61 km^{2} (11.82 sq mi)
- Elevation: 159 m (522 ft)

Population (2018-01-01)
  - Total: 8,651
  - Density: 282.6/km^{2} (732.0/sq mi)
- Time zone: UTC+1 (CET)
  - Summer (DST): UTC+2 (CEST)
- Postal code: 2232
- Area code: 02247
- Website: www.deutsch-wagram.gv.at

Deutsch-Wagram (literally "German Wagram", German pronunciation: [ˈvaːɡʁam]), often shortened to Wagram, is a village in the Gänserndorf District, in the state of Lower Austria, Austria. It is in the Marchfeld Basin, close to the Vienna city limits, about 15 km (9 mi) northeast of the city centre.

== History ==
The settlement was probably established in the Bavarian March of Austria by colonists in the course of the Ostsiedlung. Wagram was first mentioned in a 1258 tithe register, drawn up when King Ottokar II of Bohemia ruled over the Austrian duchy. It was named after a now silted up meander of the Danube river, where the waves (German: Wogen) crashed against the shore (Rain). In 1560 it received the prefix Deutsch- to differ it from Kroatisch-Wagram (today part of Eckartsau), a village founded by Croat settlers in the course of the 1529 Ottoman Siege of Vienna.

In 1580 the population turned Protestant but was forcefully converted in the Counter-Reformation under the Habsburg emperor Ferdinand II shortly afterwards.

Deutsch-Wagram was the location of the 1809 Battle of Wagram fought between invading French troops under Napoleon and an Austrian army led by Archduke Charles.

The population rose after the area was connected with the Austrian capital by the opening of the Emperor Ferdinand Northern Railway (the present-day Austrian North Railway) in 1837. The former village was elevated to the status of a market town in 1929 and received town privileges in 1984. The firearm company Glock was founded here in 1963.

== Politics ==
Seats in the municipal assembly (Gemeinderat) as of 2015 elections:

- Austrian People's Party (ÖVP): 17
- Social Democratic Party of Austria (SPÖ): 7
- wir4dw (independents): 4
- The Greens: 3
- Freedom Party of Austria (FPÖ): 2

== Twin towns ==
Deutsch-Wagram is twinned with:

- Calheta de São Miguel, Cape Verde
- Gbely, Slovakia
- (United States) Wagram, North Carolina, U.S. is a town named after and founded by immigrants from Deutsch-Wagram in the 1860’s.

== Notable people ==
- Johann Sahulka (1857–1927), electrical engineer
- Thomas Forstner (born 1969), singer, represented Austria in the Eurovision Song Contest in 1989 & 1991

=== Residents ===
- Jürgen Melzer (born 1981), an Austrian former tennis player, singles ranking of world No. 8 in April 2011

== See also ==
- Princes of Wagram
