= Smith & Wesson SD VE =

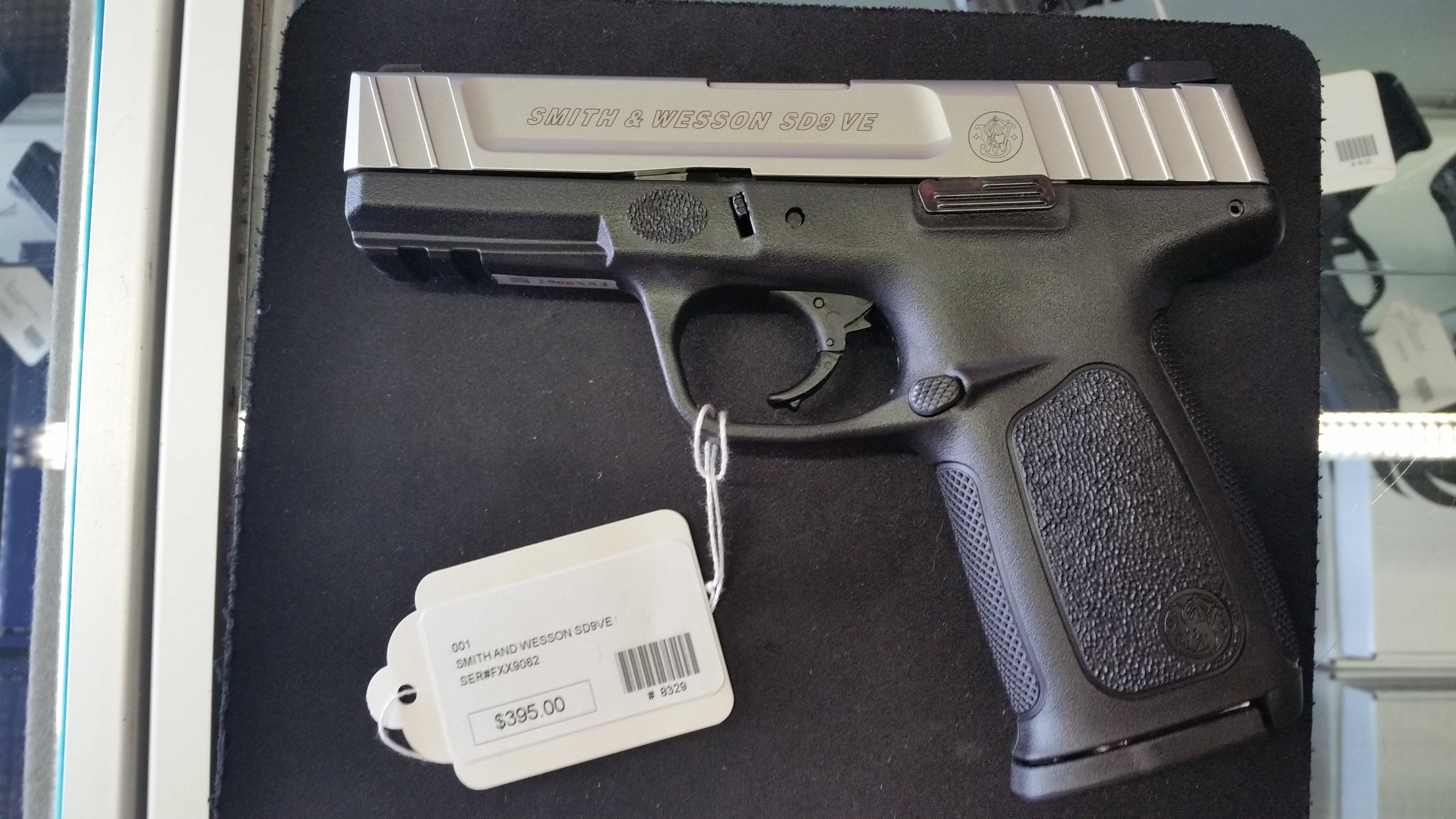
- Smith & Wesson SD9VE
- Type: Semi-automatic pistol
- Place of origin: United States

Production history
- Manufacturer: Smith & Wesson
- Produced: 2010–present
- Variants: SD9 (black slide); SD40 (black slide); SD9 VE (stainless steel slide); SD40 VE (stainless steel slide)

Specifications
- Cartridge: 9×19mm Parabellum; .40 S&W
- Action: Striker-fired
- Effective firing range: 200 yards (182m)
- Feed system: Detachable box magazine
- Sights: Dovetailed, White Dot front and rear sights

The Smith & Wesson SD Series is a polymer-framed, striker-fired semi-automatic pistol line that the American company Smith & Wesson introduced in 2010, replacing the SW / Sigma line. Smith & Wesson started manufacturing "SD VE" (VE for Value Enhanced) models in 2012. The SD VE models have stainless steel slides. Aside from slide color differences, SD and SD VE pistols are mechanically identical.

== History ==
The SD Series is a direct evolution of the Smith & Wesson SW designs. The grip angle is the same since the SD pistols use the same magazines as the Sigma pistols (though with different magazine bottom plates). The trigger guard is larger, and the SD line has industry-standard accessory rails rather than a proprietary rail.

In December 2023, Smith & Wesson released the SD9 2.0. The 2.0's new features include a flat-face trigger (replacing the hinged trigger) and deeper slide serrations. The 2.0's slides are also distinguished by thin grooves along the top. There are other internal mechanical changes, but the 2.0 pistols use the same magazines as the previous SD9 and Sigma 9mm pistols. The 2.0 also has a lower MSRP, $349, instead of $406.

== Design details ==
The SD is a striker fired semi-automatic pistol. This trigger system prevents the gun from discharging unless the trigger is fully depressed, even if the shooter drops the pistol. The SD's aggressive front- and back strap texturing and the textured finger locator help enhance the shooter's grip and reduce recoil.

== Variants ==
Smith & Wesson offers a variety of slide and frame color combinations, some as retailer exclusives. Examples include black slides/black frames, black slides/grey frames, black slides/FDE frames, FDE slides/FDE frames, stainless steel slides/light aqua frames, etc.

The Smith & Wesson SD pistols are available in 9×19mm Parabellum and .40 S&W calibers in either a standard capacity version (16+1-round for 9mm, 14+1-round for .40) or in a restricted capacity version (10+1-rounds for both calibers).

Model	Barrel length	Caliber	Capacity (Note: rounds per magazine)	Dimensions (Note: width x length)	Weight (Note: without magazine)
SD9 std cap.	4.0 in (102 mm)	9×19mm Parabellum	16	1.29 in × 7.2 in (33 mm × 183 mm)	22.4 oz (640 g)
SD9 low cap.	4.0 in (102 mm)	9×19mm Parabellum	10	1.29 in × 7.2 in (33 mm × 183 mm)	22.4 oz (640 g)
SD40 std cap.	4.0 in (102 mm)	.40 S&W	14	1.29 in × 7.2 in (33 mm × 183 mm)	22.4 oz (640 g)
SD40 low cap.	4.0 in (102 mm)	.40 S&W	10	1.29 in × 7.2 in (33 mm × 183 mm)	22.4 oz (640 g)

== Users ==
- Afghanistan
