= Smith & Wesson SW =

Smith & Wesson SW (Sigma)
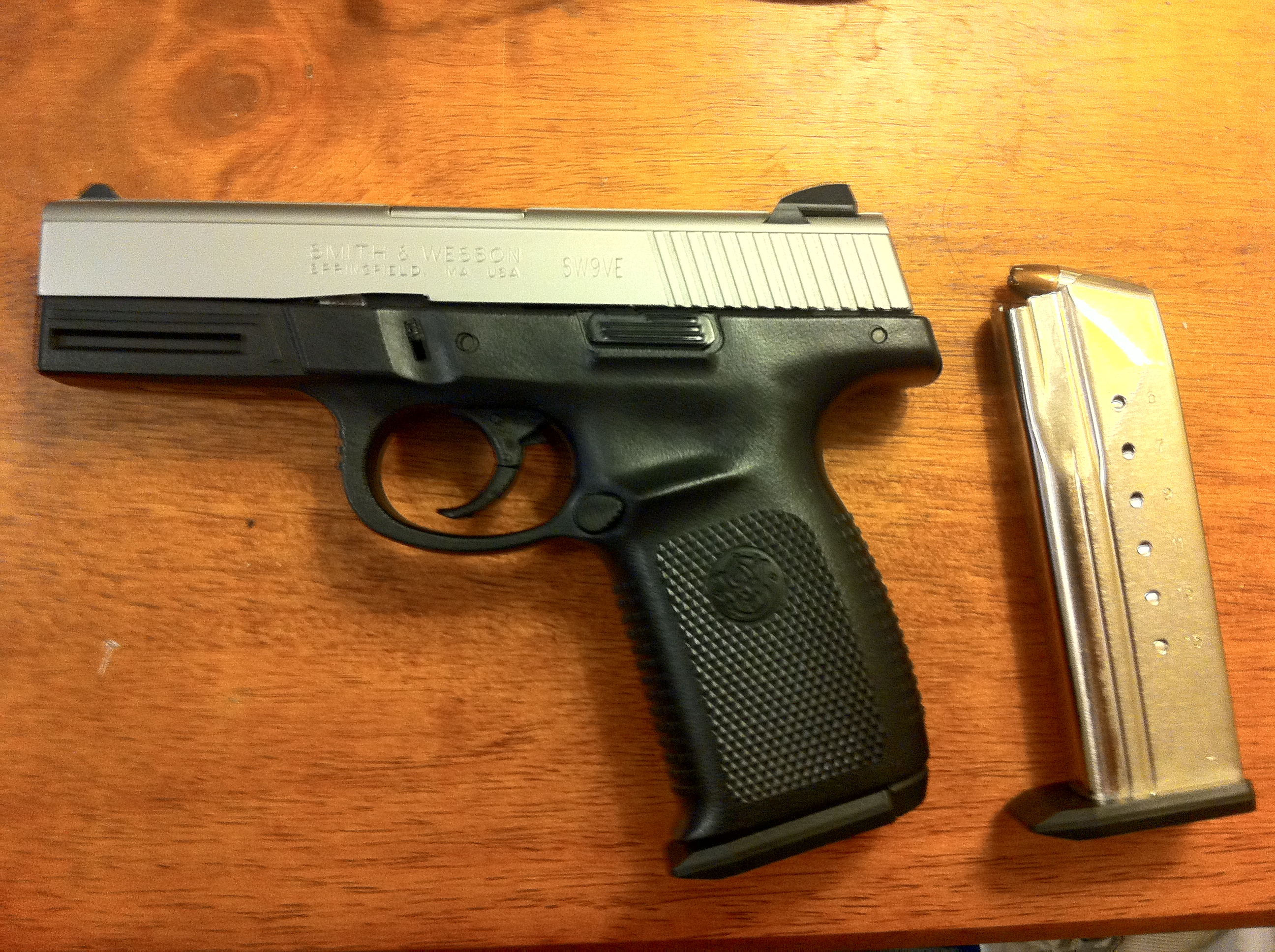
- S&W SW9VE
- Type: Semi-automatic pistol
- Place of origin: United States

Production history
- Designer: Smith & Wesson
- Designed: 1993–1994
- Manufacturer: Smith & Wesson
- Produced: 1994-2012
- Variants: SW40F, SW9F, SW40C, SW9C, SW40V, SW9V, SW40E, SW9E, SW40VE, SW40GVE, SW40Ti, SW357V, SW9VE, SW9P, SW9G, SW380M, SW9M

Specifications
- Mass: 26 ounces (740 g) (SW40F, SW9F); 24 ounces (690 g) (SW40C, SW40V, SW40VE, SW40E. SW357V); 24 1/2 ounces (700 g) (SW9C, SW9V, SW9VE, SW9E, SW9G, SW9P); 20 ounces (SW40Ti)
- Length: 7 3/4 inches (197 mm) (SW40F, SW9F); 7 1/4 inches (184 mm) (SW40C, SW40V, SW40VE, SW40E, SW40Ti, SW357V SW9C, SW9V, SW9VE, SW9E, SW9G, SW9P)
- Barrel length: 4 1/2 inches (114 mm) (SW40F, SW9F); 4 inches (102 mm) (SW40C, SW40V, SW40VE, SW40E, SW357V, SW9C, SW9V, SW9VE, SW9E, SW9G, SW9P)
- Width: 1 1/3 inches (33 mm)
- Height: 5 1/2 inches (142 mm) (SW40F, SW9F)
- Cartridge: 9×19mm Parabellum.357 SIG.380 ACP.40 S&W
- Action: Short recoil
- Feed system: Detachable box magazine; capacities: 6 rounds (SW380M); 10 rounds (all restricted models); 14 rounds (SW40F, SW357V)(standard); 16 rounds (SW9F)(standard)
- Sights: Fixed 3-dot notch sights

The Smith & Wesson SW series, most commonly referred to as the Smith & Wesson Sigma, was Smith & Wesson's first venture into using synthetic materials in pistol construction, with high-strength polymer material for the frame.

The Smith & Wesson Sigma is somewhat infamous in the gun community due to its controversial history. The design of the original Sigmas were so similar to a Glock both in their design and operation that Smith & Wesson was sued by Glock over patent infringement. This resulted in Smith & Wesson having to make alterations to the design and pay an undisclosed settlement to Glock.

The Sigma line was replaced by the similar but substantially improved Smith & Wesson SD series in 2010.

== Description ==
Created in 1994, the Sigma incorporates a pre-set striker firing mechanism. It is available in both .40 S&W cartridge and 9×19mm Parabellum, being one of the first pistols purpose-designed to handle the .40 S&W. Similarly styled sub-compact designs in .380 ACP and 9×19mm were also produced. A limited number of these pistols were also chambered in .357 SIG. The .380 ACP version bore visual similarities to the larger Sigma pistols, but used a direct-blowback operating system and was otherwise unrelated. The material used for the slide in the .380 ACP pistols is a zinc-aluminum alloy known as ZAMAK. The guns chambered in 9x19 Parabellum, .357 SIG and .40 S&W used steel slides and were all locked breech firearms using the short recoil system developed by John Browning.

== History and Design Changes ==
=== "Gen 1" ===
In 1994, S&W introduced the original Sigmas, the SW40F and SW9F chambered in .40 S&W and 9mm Luger respectively. Both were full sized models as denoted by the letter F. Both had black polymer frame and a dark blued slide. Both had "double stack" magazines with a capacity of 15 and 17 rounds respectively. It had the same grip angle as the Colt 1911A1.

Soon after, S&W introduced a pair of very small concealed carry–style variants, the SW380M and the SW9M, chambered in .380 ACP and 9mm Luger respectively. Both had a black polymer frame and a dark blued slide. Both had rudimentary sights. Both utilized a "single stack" magazine and had a large thumb cut-out to make removal of the magazine easier. The SW9M had a magazine capacity of seven rounds. The significantly smaller SW380M had a magazine capacity of six rounds.

The next incarnation of the Sigma were models limited to 10 rounds due to the 1994 Assault Weapons Ban. Smith & Wesson significantly dropped the price and changed the polymer frame color to light grey with matching slide. The model designation of these pistols were SW40V and SW9V, with V being equated with Value. Later, V models were introduced with black polymer frame and stainless-steel slides.

Simultaneously, S&W introduced the SW40C and SW9C. This version of Sigma retained the black polymer frame and black slide of the original SW40F and SW9F. These models had the Double Action Only trigger. This was a feature marketed heavily to police departments especially those transitioning from revolver to semi-automatic pistol as the trigger pull was the same for each shot. Also, the trigger pull was long and heavy similar to a double-action revolver which was believed to reduce the chance of inadvertently firing the pistol. This model was almost exclusively marketed to police departments. Used models can be found with standard capacity magazines even though most pistols produced during this period were restricted to 10 rounds. This is because police departments were exempt from the 10-round limit. After the ban on magazines holding more than 10 rounds ended, departments could legally sell both pistol and standard capacity magazine on the secondary market.

=== "Gen 2" ===
In 1999, S&W introduced the VE series. These models were billed as "enhanced" and featured an improved grip, improved trigger, and enlarged ejection port. This model returned to the black coloration of the polymer frame mated with a stainless steel or black melonite slide.

At this time, S&W retired the 4.5-inch barrel and switched all Sigmas to the 4.0-inch barrel. Sigmas from this era onward are considered "2nd generation" Sigmas. Shortly after the introduction of the VE series, Smith & Wesson further improved it by adding an accessory rail but did not change the model number to reflect this update.

Sometime after 1999, S&W introduced the SW40P and SW9P. These models were identical to the SW40VE and SW9VE but added porting to the barrel and slide, the purpose of which was to vent gases upwards to fight the muzzle flip associated with recoil.

In 2010, S&W introduced the SDVE model, nearly identical to the SWVE, however with some major improvements. The SWVE was redesigned to be more similar to the Smith & Wesson M&P, with improved ergonomics, a redesigned extractor, wider slide serrations on both the front and back of the slide, a Picatinny accessory rail and an improved trigger mechanism. While many parts are not compatible between the two, mainly trigger parts, the SD series does continue to use the same magazines as their full-size Sigma counterparts.

== Patent issue ==
The Sigma series pistols were so similar to the competing Glock pistols that Glock sued Smith & Wesson for patent infringement. The case was settled out of court in 1997, with S&W agreeing to make alterations to the Sigma design and pay an undisclosed amount to Glock.

== Users ==
- Afghanistan: Special Police unit of Taliban.

=== Former users ===
- Islamic Republic of Afghanistan: Afghan National Army, Border patrol and police (22,000+ handguns)
- Australia: Western Australia Police
- United States: Tennessee State Parks (Park Rangers were issued .40 S&W with custom logo on the hand grip) (300+handguns)

== See also ==
- Smith & Wesson
- Smith & Wesson M&P
